= List of Intel Core mobile processors =

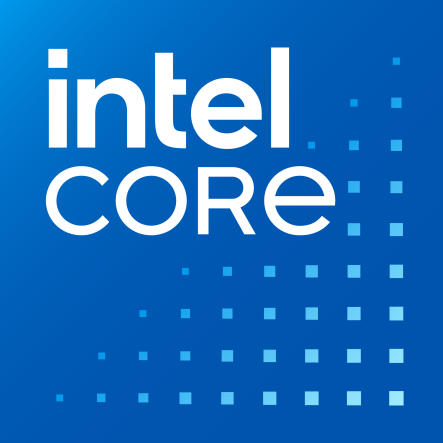
The latest badge promoting the Intel Core branding

The following is a list of Intel Core mobile processors. This includes Intel's original Core (Solo/Duo) mobile series based on the Enhanced Pentium M microarchitecture; as well as its Core 2– (Solo/Duo/Quad/Extreme), Core i3–, Core i5–, Core i7–, Core i9–, Core M– (m3/m5/m7), Core 3–, Core 5–, Core 7–, and Core 9–branded processors.

Release timeline Mobile processors
2009	Nehalem microarchitecture (1st generation)
2010	Westmere microarchitecture (1st generation)
2011	Sandy Bridge microarchitecture (2nd generation)
2012	Ivy Bridge microarchitecture (3rd generation)
2013	Haswell microarchitecture (4th generation)
2014
2015	Broadwell microarchitecture (5th generation)
2015	Skylake microarchitecture (6th generation)
2016
2017	Kaby Lake microarchitecture (7th/8th generation)
2018	Coffee Lake microarchitecture (8th generation)
2019	Comet Lake microarchitecture (10th generation)
2019	Ice Lake (10th generation)
2020	Tiger Lake (11th generation)
2021
2022	Alder Lake (12th generation)
2023	Raptor Lake (13th generation)
2023	Raptor Lake (14th generation)
2023	Meteor Lake (Ultra Series 1)
2024	Lunar Lake (Ultra Series 2)
2024	Raptor Lake (Ultra Series 2)
2025	Arrow Lake (Ultra Series 2)
2026	Panther Lake (Ultra Series 3)

== Core ==
=== Yonah ===
Model	Clock rate	L2 cache	FSB	Mult.	Voltage	TDP	Socket	Release date	Release price (USD)
Core Solo U1300	1.07 GHz	2 MB	533 MT/s	8×	0.95–1.05 V	5.5 W	Socket 479/FC-μBGA	April 2006	$241
Core Solo U1400	1.2 GHz	2 MB	533 MT/s	9×	0.95–1.05 V	5.5 W	Socket 479/FC-μBGA	April 2006	$262
Core Solo U1500	1.33 GHz	2 MB	533 MT/s	10×	0.85–1.1 V	5.5 W	Socket 479/FC-μBGA	January 2007	$262
Core Duo U2400	1.07 GHz	2 MB	533 MT/s	8×	0.8–1.1 V	9 W	Socket 479/FC-μBGA	June 2006	$262
Core Duo U2500	1.2 GHz	2 MB	533 MT/s	9×	0.8–1.1 V	9 W	Socket 479/FC-μBGA	June 2006	$289
Core Duo L2300	1.5 GHz	2 MB	667 MT/s	9×	0.762–1.212 V	15 W	Socket 479/FC-μBGA	January 2006	$284
Core Duo L2400	1.67 GHz	2 MB	667 MT/s	10×	0.762–1.212 V	15 W	Socket 479/FC-μBGA	January 2006	$316
Core Duo L2500	1.83 GHz	2 MB	667 MT/s	11×	0.762–1.212 V	15 W	Socket 479/FC-μBGA	September 2006	$316
Core Solo T1200	1.5 GHz	2 MB	667 MT/s	9×	0.7625–1.3 V	27 W	Socket M	July 2006	
Core Solo T1250	1.73 GHz	2 MB	533 MT/s	13×	0.7625–1.3 V	31 W	Socket M		
Core Solo T1300	1.67 GHz	2 MB	667 MT/s	10×	0.7625–1.3 V	27 W	Socket 479/FC-μBGA; Socket 479/FC-μBGA; Socket M; Socket M	January 2006	$209
Core Solo T1350	1.87 GHz	2 MB	533 MT/s	14×	0.7625–1.3 V	31 W	Socket M	July 2006	
Core Solo T1400	1.83 GHz	2 MB	667 MT/s	11×	0.7625–1.3 V	27 W	Socket 479/FC-μBGA; Socket 479/FC-μBGA; Socket M; Socket M	May 2006	$209
Core Solo T1500	2 GHz	2 MB	667 MT/s	12×	0.7625–1.3 V	27 W	Socket 479/FC-μBGA; Socket M	August 2006	
Core Duo T2050	1.6 GHz	2 MB	533 MT/s	12×	0.762–1.3 V	31 W	Socket M	May 2006	$140
Core Duo T2250	1.73 GHz	2 MB	533 MT/s	13×	0.762–1.3 V	31 W	Socket M	May 2006	OEM
Core Duo T2300	1.67 GHz	2 MB	667 MT/s	10×	0.762–1.3 V	31 W	Socket M; Socket M; Socket 479/FC-μBGA; Socket 479/FC-μBGA	January 2006	$241
Core Duo T2300E	1.67 GHz	2 MB	667 MT/s	10×	0.762–1.3 V	31 W	Socket M; Socket M; μFCBGA-479; μFCBGA-479	May 2006	$209
Core Duo T2350	1.87 GHz	2 MB	533 MT/s	14×	0.762–1.3 V	31 W	Socket M		OEM
Core Duo T2400	1.83 GHz	2 MB	667 MT/s	11×	0.762–1.3 V	31 W; 31 W; 27 W; 27 W	Socket M; Socket M; Socket 479/FC-μBGA; Socket 479/FC-μBGA	January 2006	$294
Core Duo T2450	2 GHz	2 MB	533 MT/s	15×	0.762–1.3 V	31 W	Socket M		OEM
Core Duo T2500	2 GHz	2 MB	667 MT/s	12×	0.762–1.3 V	31 W	Socket M; Socket M; Socket 479/FC-μBGA; Socket 479/FC-μBGA	January 2006	$423
Core Duo T2600	2.17 GHz	2 MB	667 MT/s	13×	0.762–1.3 V	31 W	Socket M; Socket M; Socket 479/FC-μBGA; Socket 479/FC-μBGA	January 2006	$637
Core Duo T2700	2.33 GHz	2 MB	667 MT/s	14×	0.762–1.3 V	31 W	Socket M; Socket 479/FC-μBGA	June 2006	$637

== Core 2 ==
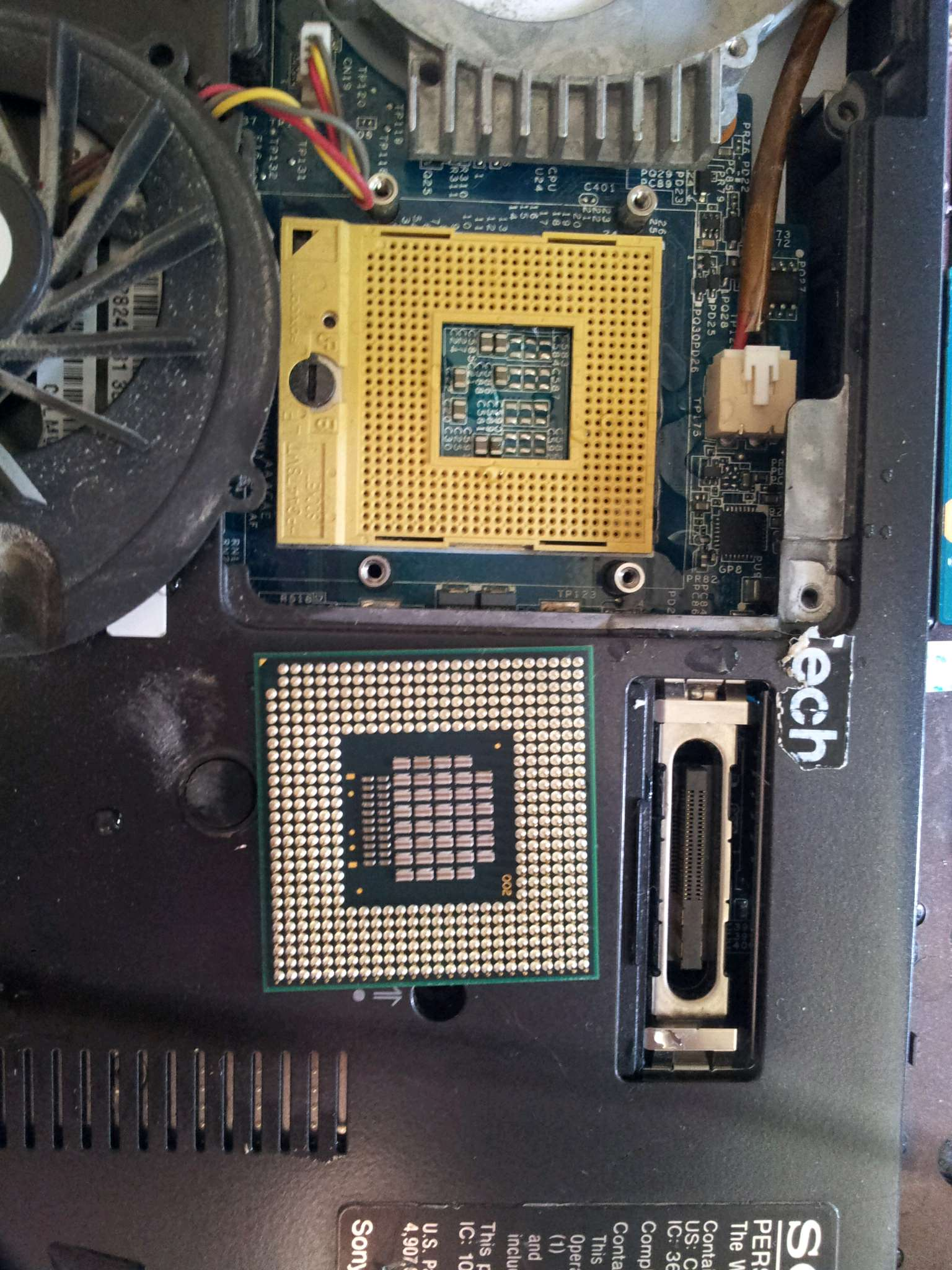
Inside of old Sony VAIO laptop (VGN-C140G)

=== "Merom-L" (65 nm) ===
- All models support: MMX, SSE, SSE2, SSE3, SSSE3, Enhanced Intel SpeedStep Technology (EIST), Intel 64, XD bit (an NX bit implementation), Intel Active Management Technology (iAMT2), Intel VT-x, Trusted Execution Technology (TXT)
- Die size: 81 mm^{2}
- Steppings: A1

Model	sSpec number	Cores	Clock rate	L2 cache	FSB	Mult.	Voltage	TDP	Socket	Release date	Part number(s)	Release price (USD)
ultra-low voltage
Core 2 Solo ULV U2100	SLAGM (A1)	1	1.07 GHz	1 MB	533 MT/s	8×	0.86–0.975 V	5.5 W	Micro-FCBGA	September 2007	LE80537UE0041M	$241
Core 2 Solo ULV U2200	SLAGL (A1)	1	1.2 GHz	1 MB	533 MT/s	9×	0.86–0.975 V	5.5 W	Micro-FCBGA	September 2007	LE80537UE0091M	$262

=== "Merom", "Merom-2M" (standard-voltage, 65 nm) ===
- All models support: MMX, SSE, SSE2, SSE3, SSSE3, Enhanced Intel SpeedStep Technology (EIST), Intel 64, XD bit (an NX bit implementation), Intel Active Management Technology (iAMT2)
- Model T7600G features an unlocked clock multiplier. Only sold OEM in the Dell XPS M1710.
- Intel VT-x: Supported by T5500 (L2), T5600 and all T7xxx
- Intel Dynamic Front Side Bus Frequency Switching: Supported by E1, G0, G2, M0 Steppings
- Socket P processors can throttle the front-side bus (FSB) anywhere between 400 and 800 MT/s as needed.
- Die size: 143 mm^{2} (Merom), 111 mm^{2} (Merom-2M)
- Steppings: B2, E1, G0, G2 (Merom), L2, M0 (Merom-2M)
- All models of stepping B2 released in July 2006, stepping L2 released in January 2007.

Model	sSpec number	Cores	Clock rate	L2 cache	FSB	Mult.	Voltage	TDP	Socket	Release date	Part number(s)	Release price (USD)
Core 2 Duo T5200	SL9VP (B2)	2	1.6 GHz	2 MB	533 MT/s	12×	0.95–1.175 V	34 W	Socket M	October 2006	LF80537GE0252M	OEM
Core 2 Duo T5250	SLA9S (M0)	2	1.5 GHz	2 MB	667 MT/s	9×	0.95–1.175 V	35 W	Socket P	Q2 2007	LF80537GF0212M	OEM
Core 2 Duo T5270	SLALK (M0)	2	1.4 GHz	2 MB	800 MT/s	7×	0.95–1.175 V	35 W	Socket P	October 2007	LF80537GG0172M	OEM
Core 2 Duo T5300	SL9WE (L2)	2	1.73 GHz	2 MB	533 MT/s	13×	0.95–1.175 V	34 W	Socket M	Q1 2007	LF80537GE0302M	OEM
Core 2 Duo T5450	SLA4F (M0)	2	1.67 GHz	2 MB	667 MT/s	10×	0.95–1.175 V	35 W	Socket P	Q2 2007	LF80537GF0282MT	OEM
Core 2 Duo T5470	SLAEB (M0)	2	1.6 GHz	2 MB	800 MT/s	8×	0.95–1.175 V	35 W	Socket P	July 2007	LF80537GG0252M	OEM
Core 2 Duo T5500	SL9SH (B2); SLGFK (G2); SL9U4 (L2)	2	1.67 GHz	2 MB	667 MT/s	10×	0.95–1.175 V	34 W	Socket M	August 28, 2006	LF80537GF0282M	$209
Core 2 Duo T5500	SL9SQ (B2); SL9U8 (L2)	2	1.67 GHz	2 MB	667 MT/s	10×	0.95–1.175 V	34 W	BGA479	August 2006	LE80537GF0282M	$209
Core 2 Duo T5550	SLA4E (M0)	2	1.83 GHz	2 MB	667 MT/s	11×	0.95–1.175 V	35 W	Socket P	January 2008	LF80537GF0342MT	OEM
Core 2 Duo T5600	SL9SG (B2); SL9U3 (L2)	2	1.83 GHz	2 MB	667 MT/s	11×	0.95–1.175 V	34 W	Socket M	August 2006	LF80537GF0342M	$241
Core 2 Duo T5600	SL9SP (B2); SL9U7 (L2)	2	1.83 GHz	2 MB	667 MT/s	11×	0.95–1.175 V	34 W	BGA479	August 2006	LE80537GF0342M	$241
Core 2 Duo T5670	SLAJ5 (M0)	2	1.8 GHz	2 MB	800 MT/s	9×	0.95–1.175 V	35 W	Socket P	Q2 2008	LF80537GG0332MN	OEM
Core 2 Duo T5750	SLA4D (M0)	2	2 GHz	2 MB	667 MT/s	12×	0.95–1.175 V	35 W	Socket P	January 2008	LF80537GF0412M	OEM
Core 2 Duo T5800	SLB6E (M0)	2	2 GHz	2 MB	800 MT/s	10×	0.95–1.175 V	35 W	Socket P	Q4 2008	LF80537GG041F	OEM
Core 2 Duo T5850	SLA4C (M0)	2	2.17 GHz	2 MB	667 MT/s	13×	0.95–1.175 V	35 W	Socket P	Q4 2008	LF80537GF0482M	OEM
Core 2 Duo T5870	SLAZR (M0)	2	2 GHz	2 MB	800 MT/s	10×	0.95–1.175 V	35 W	Socket P	2008	LF80537GG0412MN	OEM
Core 2 Duo T5900	SLB6D (M0)	2	2.2 GHz	2 MB	800 MT/s	11×	0.95–1.175 V	35 W	Socket P	July 2008	LF80537GG049F	OEM
Core 2 Duo T7100	SLA4A (M0)	2	1.8 GHz	2 MB	800 MT/s	9×	0.95–1.175 V	35 W	Socket P	May 2007	LF80537GG0332M	$209
Core 2 Duo T7100	SLA3U (M1)	2	1.8 GHz	2 MB	800 MT/s	9×	0.95–1.175 V	35 W	FCBGA6	May 2007	LE80537GG0332M	$209
Core 2 Duo T7200	SL9SF (B2)	2	2 GHz	4 MB	667 MT/s	12×	0.95–1.175 V	34 W	Socket M	August 2006	LF80537GF0414M	$294
Core 2 Duo T7200	SL9SL (B2)	2	2 GHz	4 MB	667 MT/s	12×	0.95–1.175 V	34 W	FCBGA6	August 2006	LE80537GF0414M	$294
Core 2 Duo T7250	SLA49 (M0); SLAXH (M0)	2	2 GHz	2 MB	800 MT/s	10×	0.95–1.175 V	35 W	Socket P	September 2007	LF80537GG0412M	$290
Core 2 Duo T7250	SLA3T (M1)	2	2 GHz	2 MB	800 MT/s	10×	0.95–1.175 V	35 W	FCBGA6	September 2007	LE80537GG0412M	$290
Core 2 Duo T7300	SLAMD (G0); SLA45 (E1)	2	2 GHz	4 MB	800 MT/s	10×	0.95–1.175 V	35 W	Socket P	May 2007	LF80537GG0414M; LF80537GG0414M	$241
Core 2 Duo T7300	SLA3P (E1); SLAMF (G0)	2	2 GHz	4 MB	800 MT/s	10×	0.95–1.175 V	35 W	FCBGA6	May 2007	LE80537GG0414M	$241
Core 2 Duo T7400	SL9SE (B2); SLGFJ (G2)	2	2.17 GHz	4 MB	667 MT/s	13×	0.95–1.175 V	34 W	Socket M	August 2006	LF80537GF0484M	$423
Core 2 Duo T7400	SL9SK (B2); SLGFV (G2)	2	2.17 GHz	4 MB	667 MT/s	13×	0.95–1.175 V	34 W	FCBGA6	August 2006	LE80537GF0484M	$423
Core 2 Duo T7500	SLA44 (E1); SLAF8 (G0)	2	2.2 GHz	4 MB	800 MT/s	11×	0.95–1.175 V	35 W	Socket P	May 2007	LF80537GG0494M	$316
Core 2 Duo T7500	SLA3N (E1); SLADM (G0)	2	2.2 GHz	4 MB	800 MT/s	11×	0.95–1.175 V	35 W	FCBGA6	May 2007	LE80537GG0494M	$316
Core 2 Duo T7600	SL9SD (B2)	2	2.33 GHz	4 MB	667 MT/s	14×	0.95–1.175 V	34 W	Socket M	August 2006	LF80537GF0534M	$637
Core 2 Duo T7600	SL9SJ (B2)	2	2.33 GHz	4 MB	667 MT/s	14×	0.95–1.175 V	34 W	FCBGA6	August 2006	LE80537GF0534M	$637
Core 2 Duo T7600G	SL9U5 (B2)	2	2.33 GHz	4 MB	667 MT/s	14×	0.95–1.175 V	34 W	Socket M	December 2006	LF80537GF0534MU	
Core 2 Duo T7700	SLA43 (E1); SLAF7 (G0)	2	2.4 GHz	4 MB	800 MT/s	12×	0.95–1.175 V	35 W	Socket P	May 2007	LF80537GG0564M	$530
Core 2 Duo T7700	SLA3M (E1); SLADL (G0)	2	2.4 GHz	4 MB	800 MT/s	12×	0.95–1.175 V	35 W	FCBGA6	May 2007	LE80537GG0564M	$530
Core 2 Duo T7800	SLAF6 (G0)	2	2.6 GHz	4 MB	800 MT/s	13×	0.95–1.175 V	35 W	Socket P	September 2007	LF80537GG0644ML	$530
Core 2 Duo T7800	SLA75 (G0)	2	2.6 GHz	4 MB	800 MT/s	13×	0.95–1.175 V	35 W	FCBGA6	September 2007	LE80537GG0644M	$530

See also: Versions of the same Merom-2M core with half the L2 cache disabled are available under the Pentium Dual-Core brand.

=== "Merom" (low-voltage, 65 nm) ===
- All models support: MMX, SSE, SSE2, SSE3, SSSE3, Enhanced Intel SpeedStep Technology (EIST), Intel 64, XD bit (an NX bit implementation), Intel Active Management Technology (iAMT2), Intel VT-x, Trusted Execution Technology (TXT)
- Intel Dynamic Front Side Bus Frequency Switching: Supported by E1, G0, G2 Steppings
- Die size: 143 mm^{2}
- Steppings: B2, E1, G0, G2

Model	sSpec number	Cores	Clock rate	L2 cache	FSB	Mult.	Voltage	TDP	Socket	Release date	Part number(s)	Release price (USD)
Core 2 Duo SL7100	SLAJD; SLAT4	2	1.2 GHz	4 MB	800 MT/s	6×		12 W	μFC-BGA 956		SY80537LG0094M	OEM
Core 2 Duo L7200	SL9SN (B2)	2	1.33 GHz	4 MB	667 MT/s	8×	0.9–1.2 V	17 W	FCBGA6	Q1 2007	LE80537LF0144M	$284
Core 2 Duo L7300	SLA3S (E1)	2	1.4 GHz	4 MB	800 MT/s	7×	0.9–1.1 V	17 W	FCBGA6	May 2007	LE80537LG0174M	$284
Core 2 Duo L7400	SL9SM (B2); SLGFX (G2)	2	1.5 GHz	4 MB	667 MT/s	9×	0.9–1.2 V	17 W	FCBGA6	Q1 2007	LE80537LF0214M	$316
Core 2 Duo L7500	SLA3R (E1); SLAET (G0)	2	1.6 GHz	4 MB	800 MT/s	8×	0.9–1.1 V	17 W	FCBGA6	May 2007	LE80537LG0254M	$316
Core 2 Duo SP7500	SLAT2; SLAEV	2	1.6 GHz	4 MB	800 MT/s	8×	1.0–1.25 V	20 W	μFC-BGA 956		SY80537GG0254M	OEM
Core 2 Duo L7700	SLAES (G0)	2	1.8 GHz	4 MB	800 MT/s	9×	0.9–1.1 V	17 W	FCBGA6	September 2007	LE80537LG0334M	$316
Core 2 Duo SP7700	SLALQ; SLALR; SLASZ	2	1.8 GHz	4 MB	800 MT/s	9×	1.0–1.25 V	20 W	μFC-BGA 956		SY80537GG0334M; SY80537GG0334ML	OEM

=== "Merom-2M" (ultra-low-voltage, 65 nm) ===
- All models support: MMX, SSE, SSE2, SSE3, SSSE3, Enhanced Intel SpeedStep Technology (EIST), Intel 64, XD bit (an NX bit implementation), Intel Active Management Technology (iAMT2), Intel VT-x
- Die size: 111 mm^{2}
- Steppings: L2, M0

Model	sSpec number	Cores	Clock rate	L2 cache	FSB	Mult.	Voltage	TDP	Socket	Release date	Part number(s)	Release price (USD)
Core 2 Duo U7500	SLA2V (L2); SLAUT (M0)	2	1.07 GHz	2 MB	533 MT/s	8×	0.8–0.975 V	10 W	FCBGA6 (Socket M)	April 2007	LE80537UE0042M	$262
Core 2 Duo U7500	SLV3X (M0)	2	1.07 GHz	2 MB	533 MT/s	8×	0.8–0.975 V	10 W	FCBGA6 (Socket P)	February 2008	LE80537UE0042ML	$262
Core 2 Duo U7600	SLA2U (L2); SLAUS (M0)	2	1.2 GHz	2 MB	533 MT/s	9×	0.8–0.975 V	10 W	FCBGA6 (Socket M)	April 2007	LE80537UE0092M	$289
Core 2 Duo U7600	SLV3W (M0)	2	1.2 GHz	2 MB	533 MT/s	9×	0.8–0.975 V	10 W	FCBGA6 (Socket P)	April 2007	LE80537UE0092ML	$289
Core 2 Duo U7700	SLA6X (L2); SLAUR (M0)	2	1.33 GHz	2 MB	533 MT/s	10×	0.8–0.975 V	10 W	FCBGA6 (Socket M)	December 2007	LE80537UE0142M	$289
Core 2 Duo U7700	SLV3V (M0)	2	1.33 GHz	2 MB	533 MT/s	10×	0.8–0.975 V	10 W	FCBGA6 (Socket P)	February 2008	LE80537UE0142ML	$289

=== "Merom XE" (65 nm) ===
These models feature an unlocked clock multiplier

- All models support: MMX, SSE, SSE2, SSE3, SSSE3, Enhanced Intel SpeedStep Technology (EIST), Intel 64, XD bit (an NX bit implementation), Intel Active Management Technology (iAMT2), Intel VT-x, Trusted Execution Technology (TXT), Intel Dynamic Front Side Bus Frequency Switching
- Merom XE processors support Dynamic Front Side Bus Throttling between 400 and 800 MT/s.
- Die size: 143 mm^{2}
- Steppings: E1, G0

Model	sSpec number	Cores	Clock rate	L2 cache	FSB	Mult.	Voltage	TDP	Socket	Release date	Part number(s)	Release price (USD)
Core 2 Extreme X7800	SLA6Z (E1)	2	2.6 GHz	4 MB	800 MT/s	13×	1.0375–1.3 V	44 W	Socket P	July 2007	LF80537GG0644M	$851
Core 2 Extreme X7900	SLA33 (E1); SLAF4 (G0)	2	2.8 GHz	4 MB	800 MT/s	14×	1.0375–1.3 V	44 W	Socket P	August 2007	LF80537GG0724M	$851

=== "Penryn-L" (45 nm) ===
- All models support: MMX, SSE, SSE2, SSE3, SSSE3, SSE4.1, Enhanced Intel SpeedStep Technology (EIST), Intel 64, XD bit (an NX bit implementation), Intel Active Management Technology (iAMT2), Intel VT-x, Trusted Execution Technology (TXT), Intel Dynamic Acceleration (IDA)
- Socket P processors can throttle the front-side bus (FSB) anywhere between 400 and 800 MT/s as needed.
- Die size: 82 mm^{2}
- 228 million transistors
- Package size: 22 mm × 22 mm
- Steppings: M0, R0

Model	sSpec number	Cores	Clock rate	L2 cache	FSB	Mult.	Voltage	TDP	Socket	Release date	Part number(s)	Release price (USD)
Small Form Factor, ultra-low voltage
Core 2 Solo SU3300	SLGAR (M0); SLGAJ (R0)	1	1.2 GHz	3 MB	800 MT/s	6×	1.05–1.15 V	5.5 W	μFC-BGA 956	May 2008	AV80585UG0093M	$262
Core 2 Solo SU3500	SLGFM (R0)	1	1.4 GHz	3 MB	800 MT/s	7×	1.05–1.15 V	5.5 W	μFC-BGA 956	Q2 2009	AV80585UG0173M	$262

=== "Penryn" (Apple iMac specific, 45 nm) ===
- Die size: 107 mm^{2}
- The 2008 20" iMac used the E8135 and E8335 CPUs at a lower than specified clock frequency, explaining why the same model is used at different frequencies. This list shows the frequencies used by Apple.
- Steppings: C0, E0

Model	sSpec number	Cores	Clock rate	L2 cache	FSB	Mult.	Voltage	TDP	Socket	Release date	Part number(s)	Release price (USD)
Core 2 Duo E8135	SLAQA (C0)	2	2.4 GHz	6 MB	1066 MT/s	9×		44 W	Socket P	April 2008	FF80576E8135; FF80576GH0676M	
Core 2 Duo E8135	SLG8W (E0)	2	2.67 GHz	6 MB	1066 MT/s	10×		44 W	Socket P	March 2009	AW80576GH0676M; AW80576E8135	
Core 2 Duo E8135	SLGED (E0)	2	2.67 GHz	6 MB	1066 MT/s	10×		35 W	Socket P	March 2009	AW80576GH0676M	
Core 2 Duo E8235	SLAQB (C0)	2	2.8 GHz	6 MB	1066 MT/s	10.5×		44 W	Socket P	April 2008	FF80576GH0726M	
Core 2 Duo E8335	SLAQC (C0)	2	2.93 GHz	6 MB	1066 MT/s	11×		44 W	Socket P	April 2008	FF80576GH0776M	
Core 2 Duo E8335	SLGEB (E0)	2	2.93 GHz	6 MB	1066 MT/s	11×	1.0500–1.2250 V	35 W	Socket P	March 2009	AW80576GH0776M	
Core 2 Duo E8435	SLAQD (C0)	2	3.07 GHz	6 MB	1066 MT/s	11.5×	1.0500–1.2375 V	55 W	Socket P	April 2008	FF80576GH0836M	
Core 2 Duo E8435	SLGEA (E0)	2	3.07 GHz	6 MB	1066 MT/s	11.5×		44 W	Socket P	March 2009	AW80576GH0836M	

=== "Penryn", "Penryn-3M" (standard-voltage, 45 nm) ===
- All models support: MMX, SSE, SSE2, SSE3, SSSE3, SSE4.1, Enhanced Intel SpeedStep Technology (EIST), Intel 64, XD bit (an NX bit implementation), Intel Active Management Technology (iAMT2), Intel Dynamic Acceleration (IDA)
- T6570, T6670, all T8xxx and T9xxx models support Intel VT-x
- All T9xxx models support Trusted Execution Technology (TXT)
- T6xxx models are Penryn-3M processors with 1 MB L2 cache disabled.

Note that models T8100, T8300, T9300, T9500 are Penryn processors designed for Santa Rosa Refresh platforms with maximum FSB of 800 MT/s, whereas the rest of the Penryn processors are designed for Montevina platforms that can go up to maximum FSB of 1066 MT/s.

Penryn processors support Dynamic Front Side Bus Throttling between 400–800MT/s.

- Die size: 107 mm^{2} (Penryn), 82 mm^{2} (Penryn-3M)
- Steppings: C0, E0 (Penryn) M0, R0 (Penryn-3M)

Model	sSpec number	Cores	Clock rate	L2 cache	FSB	Mult.	Voltage	TDP	Socket	Release date	Part number(s)	Release price (USD)
Core 2 Duo T6400	SLGJ4 (R0)	2	2 GHz	2 MB	800 MT/s	10×	1.00–1.250 V	35 W	Socket P	January 2009	AW80577GG0412MA	OEM
Core 2 Duo T6500	SLGF4 (R0)	2	2.1 GHz	2 MB	800 MT/s	10.5×	1.00–1.250 V	35 W	Socket P	January 2009	AW80577GG0452ML; AW80577GG0452MA	OEM
Core 2 Duo T6570	SLGLL (R0)	2	2.1 GHz	2 MB	800 MT/s	10.5×	1.00–1.250 V	35 W	Socket P	Q3 2009	AW80577GG0452MH	OEM
Core 2 Duo T6600	SLGJ9 (R0); SLGF5 (R0)	2	2.2 GHz	2 MB	800 MT/s	11×	1.00–1.250 V	35 W	Socket P	January 2009	AW80577GG0492MA; AW80577GG0492ML	OEM
Core 2 Duo T6670	SLGLK (R0); SLGLJ (R0)	2	2.2 GHz	2 MB	800 MT/s	11×	1.00–1.250 V	35 W	Socket P	Q3 2009	AW80577GG0492MH	OEM
Core 2 Duo T6900	SLGHZ (?)	2	2.5 GHz	2 MB	800 MT/s	12.5×	1.00–1.250 V	35 W	Socket P	?	AW80577GG0602MA	OEM
Core 2 Duo T6970	SLGLJ (R0)	2	2.5 GHz	2 MB	800 MT/s	12.5×	1.00–1.250 V	35 W	Socket P	?	AW80577GG0602MH	OEM
Core 2 Duo T8100	SLAP9 (M0); SLAVJ (M0); SLAYP (M0); SLAYZ (C0); SLAUU (C0)	2	2.1 GHz	3 MB	800 MT/s	10.5×	1.000–1.250 V	35 W	Socket P	January 2008	FF80577GG0453M (M0); FF80577GG0453MN; FF80576GG0453M (C0); BX80577T8100	$209
Core 2 Duo T8100	SLAPS (M0); SLAXG (M0); SLAPT (C0); SLAZD (C0)	2	2.1 GHz	3 MB	800 MT/s	10.5×	1.000–1.250 V	35 W	FCBGA6	January 2008	EC80577GG0453M (M0); EC80576GG0453M (C0)	$209
Core 2 Duo T8300	SLAPA (M0); SLAYQ (M0)	2	2.4 GHz	3 MB	800 MT/s	12×	1.00–1.250 V	35 W	Socket P	January 2008	FF80577GG0563M; BX80577T8300	$241
Core 2 Duo T8300	SLAPR (M0); SLAPU (C0); SLAZC (C0)	2	2.4 GHz	3 MB	800 MT/s	12×	1.00–1.250 V	35 W	FCBGA6	January 2008	EC80577GG0563M (M0); EC80576GG0563M (C0)	$241
Core 2 Duo T9300	SLAQG (C0); SLAYY (C0)	2	2.5 GHz	6 MB	800 MT/s	12.5×	1.000–1.250 V	35 W	Socket P	January 2008	FF80576GG0606M	$316
Core 2 Duo T9300	SLAPV (C0); SLAZB (C0)	2	2.5 GHz	6 MB	800 MT/s	12.5×	1.000–1.250 V	35 W	FCBGA6	January 2008	EC80576GG0606M	$316
Core 2 Duo T9400	SLB46 (C0); SLB4D (C0); SLGE5 (E0)	2	2.53 GHz	6 MB	1066 MT/s	9.5×	1.050–1.162 V	35 W	Socket P	July 2008	AW80576GH0616M	$316
Core 2 Duo T9400	SL3BX (C0); SLGEK (E0)	2	2.53 GHz	6 MB	1066 MT/s	9.5×	1.050–1.162 V	35 W	FCBGA6	July 2008	AV80576GH0616M	$316
Core 2 Duo T9500	SLAQH (C0); SLAYX (C0)	2	2.6 GHz	6 MB	800 MT/s	13×	1.000–1.250 V	35 W	Socket P	January 2008	FF80576GG0646M	$530
Core 2 Duo T9500	SLAPW (C0); SLAZA (C0); SLB49 (C0); SLB4A (C0)	2	2.6 GHz	6 MB	800 MT/s	13×	1.000–1.250 V	35 W	FCBGA6	January 2008	EC80576GG0646M; AV80576SH0616M	$530
Core 2 Duo T9550	SLGE4 (E0)	2	2.67 GHz	6 MB	1066 MT/s	10×	1.050–1.212 V	35 W	Socket P	December 2008	AW80576GH0676MG	$316
Core 2 Duo T9550	SLGEL (E0)	2	2.67 GHz	6 MB	1066 MT/s	10×	1.050–1.212 V	35 W	FCBGA6	December 2008	AV80576GH0676MG	$316
Core 2 Duo T9600	SLB47 (C0); SLG8N (C0); SLG9F (E0)	2	2.8 GHz	6 MB	1066 MT/s	10.5×	1.050–1.162 V	35 W	Socket P	July 2008	AW80576GH0726M	$530
Core 2 Duo T9600	SLB43 (C0); SLGEM (E0)	2	2.8 GHz	6 MB	1066 MT/s	10.5×	1.050–1.162 V	35 W	FCBGA6	July 2008	AV80576GH0726M	$530
Core 2 Duo T9800	SLGES (E0)	2	2.93 GHz	6 MB	1066 MT/s	11×	1.050–1.212 V	35 W	Socket P	December 2008	AW80576GH0776MG	$530
Core 2 Duo T9800	SLGEP (E0)	2	2.93 GHz	6 MB	1066 MT/s	11×	1.050–1.212 V	35 W	FCBGA6	December 2008	AV80576GH0776MG	$530
Core 2 Duo T9900	SLGEE (E0)	2	3.07 GHz	6 MB	1066 MT/s	11.5×	1.050–1.2125 V	35 W	Socket P	April 2009	AW80576GH0836MG	$530
Core 2 Duo T9900	SLGKH (E0)	2	3.07 GHz	6 MB	1066 MT/s	11.5×	1.050–1.2125 V	35 W	FCBGA6	April 2009	AV80576GH0836MG	$530

=== "Penryn", "Penryn-3M" (medium-voltage, 45 nm) ===
- All models support: MMX, SSE, SSE2, SSE3, SSSE3, SSE4.1, Enhanced Intel SpeedStep Technology (EIST), Intel 64, XD bit (an NX bit implementation), Intel Active Management Technology (iAMT2), Intel VT-x (except the non-Mac P7350, P7450), Trusted Execution Technology (TXT), Intel Dynamic Acceleration (IDA)
- Select Apple subsets of P7000 series processors support Intel VT-x.
- Penryn and Penryn-3M processors support Dynamic Front Side Bus Throttling between 533–1066MT/s.
- Die size: 107 mm^{2} (Penryn), 82 mm^{2} (Penryn-3M)
- Package size: 35 mm × 35 mm
- Transistors: 410 million
- Steppings: (Core microarchitecture 45nm steppings)
  - C0, E0 (Penryn)
  - M0, R0 (Penryn-3M)
  - stepping C0/M0 is only used in the Intel Mobile 965 Express (Santa Rosa refresh) platform
  - stepping E0/R0 adds two new instructions (XSAVE/XRSTOR) and supports the later Intel Mobile 4 Express (Montevina) platform

Model	sSpec number	Cores	Clock rate	L2 cache	FSB	Mult.	Voltage	TDP	Socket	Release date	Part number(s)	Release price (USD)
Core 2 Duo P7350	SLB44 (C0); SLB53 (M0)	2	2 GHz	3 MB	1066 MT/s	7.5×	1.00–1.250 V	25 W	Socket P	Mid 2008	AW80576GH0413M; AW80577SH0413M	OEM
Core 2 Duo P7350	SLG8E (C0); SLGE3 (R0)	2	2 GHz	3 MB	1066 MT/s	7.5×	1.00–1.250 V	25 W	FC-BGA478	Mid 2008		OEM
Core 2 Duo P7370	SLG8X (R0); SLGF9 (R0)	2	2 GHz	3 MB	1066 MT/s	7.5×	1.00–1.250 V	25 W	Socket P	January 2009	AW80577SH0413M; AW80577SH0413ML	OEM
Core 2 Duo P7450	SLB45 (C0); SLGF7 (R0); SLB54 (M0); SLB56 (M0)	2	2.13 GHz	3 MB	1066 MT/s	8×	1.00–1.250 V	25 W	Socket P	January 2009	AW80577SH0463M; AW80576GH0463M (C0)	OEM
Core 2 Duo P7450	SLGFF (C0)	2	2.13 GHz	3 MB	1066 MT/s	8×	1.00–1.250 V	25 W	FC-BGA478	January 2009	AW80577P7450M (C0)	OEM
Core 2 Duo P7550	SLGF8 (R0)	2	2.27 GHz	3 MB	1066 MT/s	8.5×	1.00–1.250 V	25 W	Socket P	June 2009	AW80577SH0513MA	OEM
Core 2 Duo P7570	SLGLW (R0)	2	2.27 GHz	3 MB	1066 MT/s	8.5×	1.00–1.250 V	25 W	Socket P	Q3 2009	AW80577SH0513ML	OEM
Core 2 Duo P8400	SLB3R (M0); SLB3Q (M0); SLB52 (M0); SLG8Z (M0); SLGCC (R0); SLGCQ (R0); SLGCF (R0); SLGFC (R0); SLGCL (R0)	2	2.27 GHz	3 MB	1066 MT/s	8.5×	1.00–1.250 V	25 W	Socket P	June 13, 2008	AW80577SH0513M; AW80577SH0513MN; BX80577P8400	$209
Core 2 Duo P8400	SLB4M (M0)	2	2.27 GHz	3 MB	1066 MT/s	8.5×	1.00–1.250 V	25 W	FC-BGA478	June 2008	AV80577SH0513M	$209
Core 2 Duo P8600	SLB3S (M0); SLGA4 (M0); SLGFD (R0)	2	2.4 GHz	3 MB	1066 MT/s	9×	1.00–1.250 V	25 W	Socket P	June 2008	AW80577SH0563M; BX80577P8600	$241
Core 2 Duo P8600	SLB4N (M0); SLGDZ (R0)	2	2.4 GHz	3 MB	1066 MT/s	9×	1.00–1.250 V	25 W	FC-BGA478	June 2008	AV80577SH0563M	$241
Core 2 Duo P8700	SLGFE (R0)	2	2.53 GHz	3 MB	1066 MT/s	9.5×	1.00–1.250 V	25 W	Socket P	December 2008	AW80577SH0613MG; BX80577P8700	$241
Core 2 Duo P8700	SLGFG (R0)	2	2.53 GHz	3 MB	1066 MT/s	9.5×	1.00–1.250 V	25 W	FC-BGA478	December 2008	AV80577SH0613MG	$241
Core 2 Duo P8800	SLGLR (R0)	2	2.67 GHz	3 MB	1066 MT/s	10×	1.00–1.250 V	25 W	Socket P	Q2 2009	AW80577SH0673MG; BX80577P8800	$241
Core 2 Duo P8800	SLGLA (E0)	2	2.67 GHz	3 MB	1066 MT/s	10×	1.00–1.250 V	25 W	FC-BGA478	Q2 2009	AV80577SH0673MG	$241
Core 2 Duo P9500	SLB4E (C0); SLGE8 (E0)	2	2.53 GHz	6 MB	1066 MT/s	9.5×	1.05–1.162 V	25 W	Socket P	July 2008	AW80576SH0616M; AV80576SH0616M	$348
Core 2 Duo P9600	SLGE6 (E0)	2	2.67 GHz	6 MB	1066 MT/s	10×	1.05–1.212 V	25 W	Socket P	December 2008	AW80576SH0676MG	$348
Core 2 Duo P9700	SLGQS (E0)	2	2.8 GHz	6 MB	1066 MT/s	10.5×	1.012–1.175 V	28 W	Socket P	June 2009	AW80576SH0726MG	$348

=== "Penryn" (medium-voltage, 45 nm, Small Form Factor) ===
- All models support: MMX, SSE, SSE2, SSE3, SSSE3, SSE4.1, Enhanced Intel SpeedStep Technology (EIST), Intel 64, XD bit (an NX bit implementation), Intel Active Management Technology (iAMT2), Intel VT-x, Trusted Execution Technology (TXT), Intel Dynamic Acceleration (IDA)
- Die size: 107 mm^{2}
- Package size: 22 mm × 22 mm
- Steppings: C0, E0

Model	sSpec number	Cores	Clock rate	L2 cache	FSB	Mult.	Voltage	TDP	Socket	Release date	Part number(s)	Release price (USD)
Core 2 Duo SP9300	SLB63 (C0)	2	2.27 GHz	6 MB	1066 MT/s	8.5×	0.900–1.225 V	25 W	μFC-BGA 956	July 2008	AV80576SH0516M	$284
Core 2 Duo SP9400	SLB64 (C0); SLGHG (C0); SLGAA (E0)	2	2.4 GHz	6 MB	1066 MT/s	9×	0.900–1.225 V	25 W	μFC-BGA 956	July 2008	AV80576SH0566M	$284
Core 2 Duo SP9600	SLGER (E0)	2	2.53 GHz	6 MB	1066 MT/s	9.5×	0.900–1.225 V	25 W	μFC-BGA 956	Q1 2009	AV80576SH0516M; AV80576SH0616M	$316

=== "Penryn" (low-voltage, 45 nm, Small Form Factor) ===
- All models support: MMX, SSE, SSE2, SSE3, SSSE3, SSE4.1, Enhanced Intel SpeedStep Technology (EIST), Intel 64, XD bit (an NX bit implementation), Intel Active Management Technology (iAMT2), Intel VT-x, Trusted Execution Technology (TXT), Intel Dynamic Acceleration (IDA)
- Die size: 107 mm^{2}
- Package size: 22 mm × 22 mm
- Steppings: C0, E0

Model	sSpec number	Cores	Clock rate	L2 cache	FSB	Mult.	Voltage	TDP	Socket	Release date	Part number(s)	Release price (USD)
Core 2 Duo SL9300	SLB65 (C0); SLGHC (C0); SLGAG (E0)	2	1.6 GHz	6 MB	1066 MT/s	6×	1.050–1.150 V	17 W	μFC-BGA 956	September 2008	AV80576LH0256M	$284
Core 2 Duo SL9380	SLGA2 (C0); SLGAD (E0)	2	1.8 GHz	6 MB	800 MT/s	9×	1.050–1.150 V	17 W	μFC-BGA 956	September 2008	AV80576LG0336M	$316
Core 2 Duo SL9400	SLB66 (C0); SLGHD (C0); SLGAB (E0)	2	1.87 GHz	6 MB	1066 MT/s	7×	1.050–1.150 V	17 W	μFC-BGA 956	September 2008	AV80576LH0366M	$316
Core 2 Duo SL9600	SLGEQ (E0)	2	2.13 GHz	6 MB	1066 MT/s	8×	1.050–1.150 V	17 W	μFC-BGA 956	Q1'09	AV80576LH0466M	$316

=== "Penryn-3M" (ultra-low-voltage, 45 nm, Small Form Factor) ===
- All models support: MMX, SSE, SSE2, SSE3, SSSE3, SSE4.1, Enhanced Intel SpeedStep Technology (EIST), Intel 64, XD bit (an NX bit implementation), Intel Active Management Technology (iAMT2), Intel VT-x, Trusted Execution Technology (TXT) (except SU7300), Intel Dynamic Acceleration (IDA)
- Die size: 107 mm^{2}
- Package size: 22 mm × 22 mm
- Steppings: M0, R0

Model	sSpec number	Cores	Clock rate	L2 cache	FSB	Mult.	Voltage	TDP	Socket	Release date	Part number(s)	Release price (USD)
Core 2 Duo SU7300	SLGS6 (R0); SLGYV (R0)	2	1.3 GHz	3 MB	800 MT/s	6.5×	1.05–1.15 V	10 W	μFC-BGA 956	September 2009	AV80577UG0133M; AV80577UG0133ML	$289
Core 2 Duo SU9300	SLB5Q (M0); SLGAL (R0)	2	1.2 GHz	3 MB	800 MT/s	6×	1.05–1.15 V	10 W	μFC-BGA 956	September 2008	AV80577UG0093M	$262
Core 2 Duo SU9400	SLB5V (M0); SLGHN (M0); SLGAK (R0)	2	1.4 GHz	3 MB	800 MT/s	7×	1.05–1.15 V	10 W	μFC-BGA 956	September 2008	AV80577UG0173M	$289
Core 2 Duo SU9600	SLGEX (R0); SLGFN (R0)	2	1.6 GHz	3 MB	800 MT/s	8×	1.05–1.15 V	10 W	μFC-BGA 956	Q1 2009	AV80577UG0253M	$289

=== "Penryn XE" (45 nm) ===
- These models feature an unlocked clock multiplier
- All models support: MMX, SSE, SSE2, SSE3, SSSE3, SSE4.1, Enhanced Intel SpeedStep Technology (EIST), Intel 64, XD bit (an NX bit implementation), Intel Active Management Technology (iAMT2), Intel VT-x, Trusted Execution Technology (TXT)
- Penryn XE processors support Dynamic Front Side Bus Throttling between 400–800 MT/s and 533–1066 MT/s.
- Die size: 107 mm^{2}
- Steppings: C0, E0

Model	sSpec number	Cores	Clock rate	L2 cache	FSB	Mult.	Voltage	TDP	Socket	Release date	Part number(s)	Release price (USD)
Core 2 Extreme X9000	SLAQJ (C0); SLAZ3 (C0)	2	2.8 GHz	6 MB	800 MT/s	14×	1.062–1.150 V	44 W	Socket P	January 2008	FF80576ZG0726M	$851
Core 2 Extreme X9100	SLB48 (C0); SLG8M (C0); SLGE7 (E0)	2	3.07 GHz	6 MB	1066 MT/s	11.5×	1.062–1.150 V	44 W	Socket P	July 2008	AW80576GH0836M	$851

=== "Penryn QC" (45 nm) ===
- All models support: MMX, SSE, SSE2, SSE3, SSSE3, SSE4.1, Enhanced Intel SpeedStep Technology (EIST), Intel 64, XD bit (an NX bit implementation), Intel Active Management Technology (iAMT2), Intel VT-x, Trusted Execution Technology (TXT)
- Can throttle the front-side bus (FSB) anywhere between 533 and 1066 MT/s as needed.
- Die size: 2 × 107 mm^{2}
- Steppings: E0

Model	sSpec number	Cores	Clock rate	L2 cache	FSB	Mult.	Voltage	TDP	Socket	Release date	Part number(s)	Release price (USD)
Core 2 Quad Q9000	SLGEJ (E0)	4	2 GHz	2 × 3 MB	1066 MT/s	7.5×	1.050–1.175 V	45 W	Socket P	December 2008	AW80581GH0416M; BX80581Q9000	$348
Core 2 Quad Q9100	SLB5G (E0)	4	2.27 GHz	2 × 6 MB	1066 MT/s	8.5×	1.050–1.175 V	45 W	Socket P	August 2008	AW80581GH051003	$851

=== "Penryn QC XE" (45 nm) ===
- This model features an unlocked clock multiplier usually manipulated through the systems BIOS however some manufacturers (such as HP) do not have this feature enabled on their laptops that use this processor.
- All models support: MMX, SSE, SSE2, SSE3, SSSE3, SSE4.1, Enhanced Intel SpeedStep Technology (EIST), Intel 64, XD bit (an NX bit implementation), Intel Active Management Technology (iAMT2), Intel VT-x, Trusted Execution Technology (TXT)
- Can throttle the front-side bus (FSB) anywhere between 533 and 1066 MT/s as needed.
- Package size: 35 mm × 35 mm
- Die size: 2 × 107 mm^{2}
- Steppings: E0

Model	sSpec number	Cores	Clock rate	L2 cache	FSB	Mult.	Voltage	TDP	Socket	Release date	Part number(s)	Release price (USD)
Core 2 Extreme QX9300	SLB5J (E0)	4	2.53 GHz	2 × 6 MiB	1066 MT/s	9.5×	1.050–1.175 V	45 W	Socket P	August 2008	AW80581ZH061003	$1038

== Core i (1st gen) ==
=== Clarksfield ===
Common features:

- Socket: G1.
- All the CPUs support dual-channel DDR3-1333 RAM.
- All CPU models provide 16 lanes of PCIe 2.0.
- All CPUs feature a DMI 1.0 bus to the chipset (PCH).
- No integrated graphics.
- L1 cache: 64 KB (32 KB data + 32 KB instructions) per core.
- L2 cache: 256 KB per core.
- Fabrication process: 45 nm.
- XM-suffix processors have an unlocked multiplier and can be overclocked.

Processor branding	Model	Cores (Threads)	Clock rate (GHz)		Smart Cache	TDP	Release date
Processor branding	Model	Cores (Threads)	Base	Turbo	Smart Cache	TDP	Release date
Core i7	940XM	4 (8)	2.13	3.33	8 MB	55 W	June 2010
Core i7	920XM	4 (8)	2.00	3.20	8 MB	55 W	September 2009
Core i7	840QM	4 (8)	1.86	3.20	8 MB	45 W	June 2010
Core i7	820QM	4 (8)	1.73	3.06	8 MB	45 W	September 2009
Core i7	740QM	4 (8)	1.73	2.93	6 MB	45 W	June 2010
Core i7	720QM	4 (8)	1.60	2.80	6 MB	45 W	September 2009

=== Arrandale ===
Common features:

- Socket: All models (except i3-380M) are available in BGA-1288; M-suffix (excluding UM- and LM-suffix) models are also available as Socket G1.
- All the CPUs support dual-channel DDR3 RAM. All models support it at 800 MT/s speeds while M- and LM-suffix models support up to 1066 MT/s speeds.
- All CPU models provide 16 lanes of PCIe 2.0.
- All CPUs feature a DMI 1.0 bus to the chipset (PCH).
- L1 cache: 64 KB (32 KB data + 32 KB instructions) per core.
- L2 cache: 256 KB per core.
- Fabrication process: 32 nm.

Processor branding	Model	Cores (Threads)	Clock rate (GHz)		Integrated GPU		Smart Cache	TDP	Release date
Processor branding	Model	Cores (Threads)	Base	Turbo	Model	Clock (MHz)	Smart Cache	TDP	Release date
Core i7	680UM	2 (4)	1.46	2.53	HD Graphics	166–500	4 MB	18 W	September 2010
Core i7	660LM	2 (4)	2.26	3.06	HD Graphics	266–566	4 MB	25 W	September 2010
Core i7	660UM	2 (4)	1.33	2.40	HD Graphics	166–500	4 MB	18 W	May 2010
Core i7	640M	2 (4)	2.80	3.46	HD Graphics	500–766	4 MB	35 W	September 2010
Core i7	640LM	2 (4)	2.13	2.93	HD Graphics	266–566	4 MB	25 W	January 2010
Core i7	640UM	2 (4)	1.20	2.27	HD Graphics	166–500	4 MB	18 W	January 2010
Core i7	620M	2 (4)	2.66	3.33	HD Graphics	500–766	4 MB	35 W	January 2010
Core i7	620LM	2 (4)	2.00	2.80	HD Graphics	266–566	4 MB	25 W	January 2010
Core i7	620UM	2 (4)	1.06	2.13	HD Graphics	166–500	4 MB	18 W	January 2010
Core i5	580M	2 (4)	2.66	3.33	HD Graphics	500–766	3 MB	35 W	September 2010
Core i5	560M	2 (4)	2.66	3.20	HD Graphics	500–766	3 MB	35 W	September 2010
Core i5	560UM	2 (4)	1.33	2.13	HD Graphics	166–500	3 MB	18 W	September 2010
Core i5	540M	2 (4)	2.53	3.07	HD Graphics	500–766	3 MB	35 W	January 2010
Core i5	540UM	2 (4)	1.20	2.00	HD Graphics	166–500	3 MB	18 W	May 2010
Core i5	520M	2 (4)	2.40	2.93	HD Graphics	500–766	3 MB	35 W	January 2010
Core i5	520UM	2 (4)	1.07	1.87	HD Graphics	166–500	3 MB	18 W	January 2010
Core i5	480M	2 (4)	2.66	2.93	HD Graphics	500–766	3 MB	35 W	January 2011
Core i5	470UM	2 (4)	1.33	1.86	HD Graphics	166–500	3 MB	18 W	October 2010
Core i5	460M	2 (4)	2.53	2.80	HD Graphics	500–766	3 MB	35 W	September 2010
Core i5	450M	2 (4)	2.40	2.66	HD Graphics	500–766	3 MB	35 W	June 2010
Core i5	430M	2 (4)	2.26	2.53	HD Graphics	500–766	3 MB	35 W	January 2010
Core i5	430UM	2 (4)	1.20	1.73	HD Graphics	166–500	3 MB	18 W	May 2010
Core i3	390M	2 (4)	2.66	—N/a	HD Graphics	500–667	3 MB	35 W	January 2011
Core i3	380M	2 (4)	2.53	—N/a	HD Graphics	500–667	3 MB	35 W	September 2010
Core i3	380UM	2 (4)	1.33	—N/a	HD Graphics	166–500	3 MB	18 W	October 2010
Core i3	370M	2 (4)	2.40	—N/a	HD Graphics	500–667	3 MB	35 W	June 2010
Core i3	350M	2 (4)	2.26	—N/a	HD Graphics	500–667	3 MB	35 W	January 2010
Core i3	330M	2 (4)	2.13	—N/a	HD Graphics	500–667	3 MB	35 W	January 2010
Core i3	330UM	2 (4)	1.20	—N/a	HD Graphics	166–500	3 MB	18 W	May 2010

== Core i (2nd gen) ==
=== Sandy Bridge-M ===
Common features:

- Socket: G2, BGA 1023 (dual-core models), BGA 1224 (quad-core models).
- All the CPUs support dual-channel DDR3 RAM. All models support it at 1333 MT/s speeds while i7-2720QM and above support up to 1600 MT/s speeds.
- All CPU models provide 16 lanes of PCIe 2.0.
- All CPUs feature a DMI 2.0 bus to the chipset (PCH).
- L1 cache: 64 KB (32 KB data + 32 KB instructions) per core.
- L2 cache: 256 KB per core.
- Fabrication process: 32 nm.
- XM-suffix models have an unlocked multiplier and can be overclocked.

Processor branding	Model	Cores (Threads)	Clock rate (GHz)		Integrated GPU		Smart Cache	TDP	Release date
Processor branding	Model	Cores (Threads)	Base	Turbo	Model	Clock (MHz)	Smart Cache	TDP	Release date
Core i7	2960XM	4 (8)	2.7	3.7	HD 3000	650–1300	8 MB	55 W	September 2011
Core i7	2920XM	4 (8)	2.5	3.5	HD 3000	650–1300	8 MB	55 W	January 2011
Core i7	2860QM	4 (8)	2.5	3.6	HD 3000	650–1300	8 MB	45 W	September 2011
Core i7	2820QM	4 (8)	2.3	3.4	HD 3000	650–1300	8 MB	45 W	January 2011
Core i7	2760QM	4 (8)	2.4	3.5	HD 3000	650–1300	6 MB	45 W	September 2011
Core i7	2720QM	4 (8)	2.2	3.3	HD 3000	650–1300	6 MB	45 W	January 2011
Core i7	2675QM	4 (8)	2.2	3.1	HD 3000	650–1200	6 MB	45 W	October 2011
Core i7	2670QM	4 (8)	2.2	3.1	HD 3000	650–1100	6 MB	45 W	October 2011
Core i7	2635QM	4 (8)	2.0	2.9	HD 3000	650–1200	6 MB	45 W	January 2011
Core i7	2630QM	4 (8)	2.0	2.9	HD 3000	650–1100	6 MB	45 W	January 2011
Core i7	2677M	2 (4)	1.8	2.9	HD 3000	350–1200	4 MB	17 W	June 2011
Core i7	2657M	2 (4)	1.6	2.7	HD 3000	350–1000	4 MB	17 W	February 2011
Core i7	2640M	2 (4)	2.8	3.5	HD 3000	650–1300	4 MB	35 W	September 2011
Core i7	2649M	2 (4)	2.3	3.2	HD 3000	500–1100	4 MB	25 W	February 2011
Core i7	2637M	2 (4)	1.7	2.8	HD 3000	350–1200	4 MB	17 W	June 2011
Core i7	2620M	2 (4)	2.7	3.4	HD 3000	650–1300	4 MB	35 W	February 2011
Core i7	2629M	2 (4)	2.1	3.0	HD 3000	500–1100	4 MB	25 W	February 2011
Core i7	2617M	2 (4)	1.5	2.6	HD 3000	350–950	4 MB	17 W	February 2011
Core i5	2557M	2 (4)	1.7	2.7	HD 3000	350–1200	3 MB	17 W	June 2011
Core i5	2540M	2 (4)	2.6	3.3	HD 3000	650–1300	3 MB	35 W	February 2011
Core i5	2537M	2 (4)	1.4	2.3	HD 3000	350–900	3 MB	17 W	February 2011
Core i5	2520M	2 (4)	2.5	3.2	HD 3000	650–1300	3 MB	35 W	February 2011
Core i5	2467M	2 (4)	1.6	2.3	HD 3000	350–1150	3 MB	17 W	June 2011
Core i5	2450M	2 (4)	2.5	3.1	HD 3000	650–1300	3 MB	35 W	January 2012
Core i5	2435M	2 (4)	2.4	3.0	HD 3000	650–1300	3 MB	35 W	September 2011
Core i5	2430M	2 (4)	2.4	3.0	HD 3000	650–1200	3 MB	35 W	October 2011
Core i5	2415M	2 (4)	2.3	2.9	HD 3000	650–1300	3 MB	35 W	Q1 2011
Core i5	2410M	2 (4)	2.3	2.9	HD 3000	650–1200	3 MB	35 W	February 2011
Core i3	2370M	2 (4)	2.4	—N/a	HD 3000	650–1150	3 MB	35 W	January 2012
Core i3	2377M	2 (4)	1.5	—N/a	HD 3000	350–1000	3 MB	17 W	September 2012
Core i3	2375M	2 (4)	1.5	—N/a	HD 3000	350–1000	3 MB	17 W	Q1 2013
Core i3	2367M	2 (4)	1.4	—N/a	HD 3000	350–1000	3 MB	17 W	October 2011
Core i3	2365M	2 (4)	1.4	—N/a	HD 3000	350–1000	3 MB	17 W	September 2012
Core i3	2350M	2 (4)	2.3	—N/a	HD 3000	650–1150	3 MB	35 W	October 2011
Core i3	2357M	2 (4)	1.3	—N/a	HD 3000	350–950	3 MB	17 W	June 2011
Core i3	2348M	2 (4)	2.3	—N/a	HD 3000	650–1150	3 MB	35 W	January 2013
Core i3	2332M	2 (4)	2.2	—N/a	HD 3000	650–1100	3 MB	35 W	September 2011
Core i3	2330M	2 (4)	2.2	—N/a	HD 3000	650–1100	3 MB	35 W	June 2011
Core i3	2328M	2 (4)	2.2	—N/a	HD 3000	650–1100	3 MB	35 W	September 2012
Core i3	2312M	2 (4)	2.1	—N/a	HD 3000	650–1100	3 MB	35 W	Q2 2011
Core i3	2310M	2 (4)	2.1	—N/a	HD 3000	650–1100	3 MB	35 W	February 2011
Core i3	2308M	2 (4)	2.1	—N/a	HD 3000	650–1100	3 MB	35 W	Q3 2012

== Core i (3rd gen) ==
=== Ivy Bridge ===
Intel i5 3230M die shot

Common features:

- Socket: G2, BGA 1023 (dual-core models), BGA 1224 (quad-core models).
- All the CPUs support dual-channel DDR3 or DDR3L RAM, at up to 1600 MT/s speed.
- All CPU models provide 16 lanes of PCIe, except Y-suffix models which do not have PCIe support. i5 and i7 M-, QM- and XM-suffix models support it at PCIe 3.0 speeds, while all other models support it at PCIe 2.0 speeds.
- All CPUs feature a DMI 2.0 bus to the chipset (PCH).
- L1 cache: 64 KB (32 KB data + 32 KB instructions) per core.
- L2 cache: 256 KB per core.
- Fabrication process: 22 nm.
- XM-suffix models have an unlocked multiplier and can be overclocked.

Processor branding	Model	Cores (Threads)	Clock rate (GHz)		Integrated GPU		Smart Cache	TDP	Release date
Processor branding	Model	Cores (Threads)	Base	Turbo	Model	Clock (MHz)	Smart Cache	TDP	Release date
Core i7	3940XM	4 (8)	3.0	3.9	HD 4000	650–1350	8 MB	55 W	September 2012
Core i7	3920XM	4 (8)	2.9	3.8	HD 4000	650–1300	8 MB	55 W	April 2012
Core i7	3840QM	4 (8)	2.8	3.8	HD 4000	650–1300	8 MB	45 W	September 2012
Core i7	3820QM	4 (8)	2.7	3.7	HD 4000	650–1250	8 MB	45 W	April 2012
Core i7	3740QM	4 (8)	2.7	3.7	HD 4000	650–1300	6 MB	45 W	September 2012
Core i7	3720QM	4 (8)	2.6	3.6	HD 4000	650–1250	6 MB	45 W	April 2012
Core i7	3635QM	4 (8)	2.4	3.4	HD 4000	650–1200	6 MB	45 W	September 2012
Core i7	3630QM	4 (8)	2.4	3.4	HD 4000	650–1150	6 MB	45 W	September 2012
Core i7	3632QM	4 (8)	2.2	3.2	HD 4000	650–1150	6 MB	35 W	October 2012
Core i7	3615QM	4 (8)	2.3	3.3	HD 4000	650–1200	6 MB	45 W	April 2012
Core i7	3610QM	4 (8)	2.3	3.3	HD 4000	650–1100	6 MB	45 W	April 2012
Core i7	3612QM	4 (8)	2.1	3.1	HD 4000	650–1100	6 MB	35 W	April 2012
Core i7	3687U	2 (4)	2.1	3.3	HD 4000	350–1200	4 MB	17 W	January 2013
Core i7	3689Y	2 (4)	1.5	2.6	HD 4000	350–850	4 MB	13 W	January 2013
Core i7	3667U	2 (4)	2.0	3.2	HD 4000	350–1150	4 MB	17 W	June 2012
Core i7	3540M	2 (4)	3.0	3.7	HD 4000	650–1300	4 MB	35 W	January 2013
Core i7	3537U	2 (4)	2.0	3.1	HD 4000	350–1200	4 MB	17 W	January 2013
Core i7	3520M	2 (4)	2.9	3.6	HD 4000	650–1250	4 MB	35 W	June 2012
Core i7	3517U	2 (4)	1.9	3.0	HD 4000	350–1150	4 MB	17 W	June 2012
Core i5	3437U	2 (4)	1.9	2.9	HD 4000	650–1200	3 MB	17 W	January 2013
Core i5	3439Y	2 (4)	1.5	2.3	HD 4000	350–850	3 MB	13 W	January 2013
Core i5	3427U	2 (4)	1.8	2.8	HD 4000	350–1150	3 MB	17 W	June 2012
Core i5	3380M	2 (4)	2.9	3.6	HD 4000	650–1250	3 MB	35 W	January 2013
Core i5	3360M	2 (4)	2.8	3.5	HD 4000	650–1200	3 MB	35 W	June 2012
Core i5	3340M	2 (4)	2.7	3.4	HD 4000	650–1250	3 MB	35 W	January 2013
Core i5	3337U	2 (4)	1.8	2.7	HD 4000	350–1100	3 MB	17 W	January 2013
Core i5	3339Y	2 (4)	1.5	2.0	HD 4000	350–850	3 MB	13 W	January 2013
Core i5	3320M	2 (4)	2.6	3.3	HD 4000	650–1200	3 MB	35 W	June 2012
Core i5	3317U	2 (4)	1.7	2.6	HD 4000	350–1050	3 MB	17 W	June 2012
Core i5	3230M	2 (4)	2.6	3.2	HD 4000	650–1100	3 MB	35 W	January 2013
Core i5	3210M	2 (4)	2.5	3.1	HD 4000	650–1100	3 MB	35 W	June 2012
Core i3	3227U	2 (4)	1.9	—N/a	HD 4000	350–1100	3 MB	17 W	January 2013
Core i3	3229Y	2 (4)	1.4	—N/a	HD 4000	350–850	3 MB	13 W	January 2013
Core i3	3217U	2 (4)	1.8	—N/a	HD 4000	350–1050	3 MB	17 W	June 2012
Core i3	3130M	2 (4)	2.6	—N/a	HD 4000	650–1100	3 MB	35 W	January 2013
Core i3	3120M	2 (4)	2.5	—N/a	HD 4000	650–1100	3 MB	35 W	September 2012
Core i3	3110M	2 (4)	2.4	—N/a	HD 4000	650–1000	3 MB	35 W	June 2012

== Core i (4th gen) ==
=== Haswell-MB ===
Common features:

- Socket: G3.
- All the CPUs support dual-channel DDR3L RAM, at up to 1600 MT/s speed.
- All CPU models provide 16 lanes of PCIe. i5 and i7 models support it at PCIe 3.0 speeds, while i3 models support it at PCIe 2.0 speeds.
- All CPUs feature a DMI 2.0 bus to the chipset (PCH).
- L1 cache: 64 KB (32 KB data + 32 KB instructions) per core.
- L2 cache: 256 KB per core.
- Fabrication process: 22 nm.
- MX-suffix models have an unlocked multiplier and can be overclocked.

Processor branding	Model	Cores (Threads)	Clock rate (GHz)		Integrated GPU		Smart Cache	TDP	Release date
Processor branding	Model	Cores (Threads)	Base	Turbo	Model	Clock (MHz)	Smart Cache	TDP	Release date
Core i7	4940MX	4 (8)	3.1	4.0	HD 4600	400–1350	8 MB	57 W	February 2014
Core i7	4930MX	4 (8)	3.0	3.9	HD 4600	400–1350	8 MB	57 W	June 2013
Core i7	4910MQ	4 (8)	2.9	3.9	HD 4600	400–1300	8 MB	47 W	February 2014
Core i7	4900MQ	4 (8)	2.8	3.8	HD 4600	400–1300	8 MB	47 W	June 2013
Core i7	4810MQ	4 (8)	2.8	3.8	HD 4600	400–1300	6 MB	47 W	February 2014
Core i7	4800MQ	4 (8)	2.7	3.7	HD 4600	400–1300	6 MB	47 W	June 2013
Core i7	4710MQ	4 (8)	2.5	3.5	HD 4600	400–1150	6 MB	47 W	April 2014
Core i7	4712MQ	4 (8)	2.3	3.3	HD 4600	400–1150	6 MB	37 W	April 2014
Core i7	4700MQ	4 (8)	2.4	3.4	HD 4600	400–1150	6 MB	47 W	June 2013
Core i7	4702MQ	4 (8)	2.2	3.2	HD 4600	400–1150	6 MB	37 W	June 2013
Core i7	4610M	2 (4)	3.0	3.7	HD 4600	400–1300	4 MB	37 W	February 2014
Core i7	4600M	2 (4)	2.9	3.6	HD 4600	400–1300	4 MB	37 W	September 2013
Core i5	4340M	2 (4)	2.9	3.6	HD 4600	400–1250	3 MB	37 W	February 2014
Core i5	4330M	2 (4)	2.8	3.5	HD 4600	400–1250	3 MB	37 W	September 2013
Core i5	4310M	2 (4)	2.7	3.4	HD 4600	400–1250	3 MB	37 W	February 2014
Core i5	4300M	2 (4)	2.6	3.3	HD 4600	400–1250	3 MB	37 W	September 2013
Core i5	4210M	2 (4)	2.6	3.2	HD 4600	400–1150	3 MB	37 W	April 2014
Core i5	4200M	2 (4)	2.5	3.1	HD 4600	400–1150	3 MB	37 W	September 2013
Core i3	4110M	2 (4)	2.6	—N/a	HD 4600	400–1100	3 MB	37 W	April 2014
Core i3	4100M	2 (4)	2.5	—N/a	HD 4600	400–1100	3 MB	37 W	September 2013
Core i3	4010M	2 (4)	2.5	—N/a	HD 4600	400–1100	3 MB	37 W	Q3 2014
Core i3	4000M	2 (4)	2.4	—N/a	HD 4600	400–1100	3 MB	37 W	September 2013

=== Haswell-ULT ===
Common features:

- Socket: BGA 1168.
- All the CPUs support dual-channel DDR3L or LPDDR3 RAM, at up to 1600 MT/s speed.
- All CPU models provide 12 lanes of PCIe 2.0 except i3-4xx5U models, which provide 10 lanes of PCIe 2.0.
- All CPUs feature a DMI 2.0 bus to the chipset (PCH).
- L1 cache: 64 KB (32 KB data + 32 KB instructions) per core.
- L2 cache: 256 KB per core.
- Fabrication process: 22 nm.

Processor branding	Model	Cores (Threads)	Clock rate (GHz)		Integrated GPU		Smart Cache	TDP	Release date
Processor branding	Model	Cores (Threads)	Base	Turbo	Model	Clock (MHz)	Smart Cache	TDP	Release date
Core i7	4650U	2 (4)	1.7	3.3	HD 5000	200–1100	4 MB	15 W	June 2013
Core i7	4600U	2 (4)	2.1	3.3	HD 4400	200–1100	4 MB	15 W	September 2013
Core i7	4578U	2 (4)	3.0	3.5	Iris 5100	200–1200	4 MB	28 W	July 2014
Core i7	4558U	2 (4)	2.8	3.3	Iris 5100	200–1200	4 MB	28 W	June 2013
Core i7	4550U	2 (4)	1.5	3.0	HD 5000	200–1100	4 MB	15 W	June 2013
Core i7	4510U	2 (4)	2.0	3.1	HD 4400	200–1100	4 MB	15 W	April 2014
Core i7	4500U	2 (4)	1.8	3.0	HD 4400	200–1100	4 MB	15 W	June 2013
Core i5	4360U	2 (4)	1.5	3.0	HD 5000	200–1100	3 MB	15 W	February 2014
Core i5	4350U	2 (4)	1.4	2.9	HD 5000	200–1100	3 MB	15 W	June 2013
Core i5	4310U	2 (4)	2.0	3.0	HD 4400	200–1100	3 MB	15 W	February 2014
Core i5	4308U	2 (4)	2.8	3.3	Iris 5100	200–1200	3 MB	28 W	July 2014
Core i5	4300U	2 (4)	1.9	2.9	HD 4400	200–1100	3 MB	15 W	September 2013
Core i5	4288U	2 (4)	2.6	3.1	Iris 5100	200–1200	3 MB	28 W	June 2013
Core i5	4278U	2 (4)	2.6	3.1	Iris 5100	200–1100	3 MB	28 W	July 2014
Core i5	4260U	2 (4)	1.4	2.7	HD 5000	200–1000	3 MB	15 W	April 2014
Core i5	4258U	2 (4)	2.4	2.9	Iris 5100	200–1100	3 MB	28 W	June 2013
Core i5	4250U	2 (4)	1.3	2.6	HD 5000	200–1000	3 MB	15 W	June 2013
Core i5	4210U	2 (4)	1.7	2.7	HD 4400	200–1000	3 MB	15 W	April 2014
Core i5	4200U	2 (4)	1.6	2.6	HD 4400	200–1000	3 MB	15 W	June 2013
Core i3	4158U	2 (4)	2.0	—N/a	Iris 5100	200–1100	3 MB	28 W	June 2013
Core i3	4120U	2 (4)	2.0	—N/a	HD 4400	200–1000	3 MB	15 W	April 2014
Core i3	4100U	2 (4)	1.8	—N/a	HD 4400	200–1000	3 MB	15 W	June 2013
Core i3	4030U	2 (4)	1.9	—N/a	HD 4400	200–1000	3 MB	15 W	April 2014
Core i3	4025U	2 (4)	1.9	—N/a	HD 4400	200–950	3 MB	15 W	April 2014
Core i3	4010U	2 (4)	1.7	—N/a	HD 4400	200–1000	3 MB	15 W	June 2013
Core i3	4005U	2 (4)	1.7	—N/a	HD 4400	200–950	3 MB	15 W	September 2013

=== Haswell-ULX ===
Common features:

- Socket: BGA 1168.
- All the CPUs support dual-channel DDR3L or LPDDR3 RAM, at up to 1600 MT/s speed.
- All CPU models provide 12 lanes of PCIe 2.0.
- All CPUs feature a DMI 2.0 bus to the chipset (PCH).
- L1 cache: 64 KB (32 KB data + 32 KB instructions) per core.
- L2 cache: 256 KB per core.
- Fabrication process: 22 nm.

Processor branding	Model	Cores (Threads)	Clock rate (GHz)		Integrated GPU		Smart Cache	TDP	Release date
Processor branding	Model	Cores (Threads)	Base	Turbo	Model	Clock (MHz)	Smart Cache	TDP	Release date
Core i7	4610Y	2 (4)	1.7	2.9	HD 4200	200–850	4 MB	11.5 W	September 2013
Core i5	4302Y	2 (4)	1.6	2.3	HD 4200	200–850	3 MB	11.5 W	September 2013
Core i5	4300Y	2 (4)	1.6	2.3	HD 4200	200–850	3 MB	11.5 W	September 2013
Core i5	4220Y	2 (4)	1.6	2.0	HD 4200	200–850	3 MB	11.5 W	April 2014
Core i5	4210Y	2 (4)	1.5	1.9	HD 4200	200–850	3 MB	11.5 W	September 2013
Core i5	4202Y	2 (4)	1.6	2.0	HD 4200	200–850	3 MB	11.5 W	September 2013
Core i5	4200Y	2 (4)	1.4	1.9	HD 4200	200–850	3 MB	11.5 W	June 2013
Core i3	4030Y	2 (4)	1.6	—N/a	HD 4200	200–850	3 MB	11.5 W	April 2014
Core i3	4020Y	2 (4)	1.5	—N/a	HD 4200	200–850	3 MB	11.5 W	September 2013
Core i3	4012Y	2 (4)	1.5	—N/a	HD 4200	200–850	3 MB	11.5 W	September 2013
Core i3	4010Y	2 (4)	1.3	—N/a	HD 4200	200–850	3 MB	11.5 W	June 2013

=== Haswell-H ===
Common features:

- Socket: BGA 1364.
- All the CPUs support dual-channel DDR3L RAM, at up to 1600 MT/s speed.
- All CPU models provide 16 lanes of PCIe 3.0.
- All CPUs feature a DMI 2.0 bus to the chipset (PCH).
- L1 cache: 64 KB (32 KB data + 32 KB instructions) per core.
- L2 cache: 256 KB per core.
- Models with Iris Pro 5200 iGPU also feature 128 MB of eDRAM, acting as L4 cache.
- Fabrication process: 22 nm.
- i7-4950HQ comes with an unlocked multiplier, allowing for users to overclock it beyond the factory set clock speed.

Processor branding	Model	Cores (Threads)	Clock rate (GHz)		Integrated GPU		Smart Cache	TDP	Release date
Processor branding	Model	Cores (Threads)	Base	Turbo	Model	Clock (MHz)	Smart Cache	TDP	Release date
Core i7	4980HQ	4 (8)	2.8	4.0	Iris Pro 5200	200–1300	6 MB	47 W	July 2014
Core i7	4960HQ	4 (8)	2.6	3.8	Iris Pro 5200	200–1300	6 MB	47 W	September 2013
Core i7	4950HQ	4 (8)	2.4	3.6	Iris Pro 5200	200–1300	6 MB	47 W	June 2013
Core i7	4870HQ	4 (8)	2.5	3.7	Iris Pro 5200	200–1200	6 MB	47 W	July 2014
Core i7	4860HQ	4 (8)	2.4	3.6	Iris Pro 5200	200–1200	6 MB	47 W	February 2014
Core i7	4850HQ	4 (8)	2.3	3.5	Iris Pro 5200	200–1200	6 MB	47 W	June 2013
Core i7	4770HQ	4 (8)	2.2	3.4	Iris Pro 5200	200–1200	6 MB	47 W	July 2014
Core i7	4760HQ	4 (8)	2.1	3.3	Iris Pro 5200	200–1200	6 MB	47 W	April 2014
Core i7	4750HQ	4 (8)	2.0	3.2	Iris Pro 5200	200–1200	6 MB	47 W	June 2013
Core i7	4720HQ	4 (8)	2.6	3.6	HD 4600	400–1200	6 MB	47 W	January 2015
Core i7	4722HQ	4 (8)	2.4	3.4	HD 4600	400–1150	6 MB	37 W	January 2015
Core i7	4710HQ	4 (8)	2.5	3.5	HD 4600	400–1200	6 MB	47 W	April 2014
Core i7	4712HQ	4 (8)	2.3	3.3	HD 4600	400–1150	6 MB	37 W	April 2014
Core i7	4700HQ	4 (8)	2.4	3.4	HD 4600	400–1200	6 MB	47 W	June 2013
Core i7	4702HQ	4 (8)	2.2	3.2	HD 4600	400–1150	6 MB	37 W	June 2013
Core i5	4210H	2 (4)	2.9	3.5	HD 4600	400–1150	3 MB	47 W	July 2014
Core i5	4200H	2 (4)	2.8	3.4	HD 4600	400–1150	3 MB	47 W	September 2013

== Core i (5th gen) ==
=== Broadwell-U ===
Common features:

- Socket: BGA 1168.
- All the CPUs support dual-channel DDR3L or LPDDR3 RAM, at up to 1600 MT/s speed. Models i5-5350U or above, along with all ix-5xx7 models, support LPDDR3 up to 1866 MT/s speed.
- All CPU models provide 12 lanes of PCIe 2.0.
- All CPUs feature a DMI 2.0 bus to the chipset (PCH).
- L1 cache: 64 KB (32 KB data + 32 KB instructions) per core.
- L2 cache: 256 KB per core.
- Fabrication process: 14 nm.

Processor branding	Model	Cores (Threads)	Clock rate (GHz)		Integrated GPU		Smart Cache	TDP	Release date
Processor branding	Model	Cores (Threads)	Base	Turbo	Model	Clock (MHz)	Smart Cache	TDP	Release date
Core i7	5650U	2 (4)	2.2	3.2	HD 6000	300–1000	4 MB	15 W	January 2015
Core i7	5600U	2 (4)	2.6	3.2	HD 5500	300–950	4 MB	15 W	January 2015
Core i7	5557U	2 (4)	3.1	3.4	Iris 6100	300–1100	4 MB	28 W	January 2015
Core i7	5550U	2 (4)	2.0	3.0	HD 6000	300–1000	4 MB	15 W	January 2015
Core i7	5500U	2 (4)	2.4	3.0	HD 5500	300–950	4 MB	15 W	January 2015
Core i5	5350U	2 (4)	1.8	2.9	HD 6000	300–1000	3 MB	15 W	January 2015
Core i5	5300U	2 (4)	2.3	2.9	HD 5500	300–900	3 MB	15 W	January 2015
Core i5	5287U	2 (4)	2.9	3.3	Iris 6100	300–1100	3 MB	28 W	January 2015
Core i5	5257U	2 (4)	2.7	3.1	Iris 6100	300–1050	3 MB	28 W	January 2015
Core i5	5250U	2 (4)	1.6	2.7	HD 6000	300–1000	3 MB	15 W	January 2015
Core i5	5200U	2 (4)	2.2	2.7	HD 5500	300–900	3 MB	15 W	January 2015
Core i3	5157U	2 (4)	2.5	—N/a	Iris 6100	300–1000	3 MB	28 W	January 2015
Core i3	5020U	2 (4)	2.2	—N/a	HD 5500	300–900	3 MB	15 W	March 2015
Core i3	5015U	2 (4)	2.1	—N/a	HD 5500	300–850	3 MB	15 W	March 2015
Core i3	5010U	2 (4)	2.1	—N/a	HD 5500	300–900	3 MB	15 W	January 2015
Core i3	5005U	2 (4)	2.0	—N/a	HD 5500	300–850	3 MB	15 W	January 2015

=== Broadwell-H ===
Common features:

- Socket: BGA 1364.
- All the CPUs support dual-channel DDR3L or LPDDR3 RAM, at up to 1866 MT/s speed.
- All CPU models provide 16 lanes of PCIe 3.0.
- All CPUs feature a DMI 2.0 bus to the chipset (PCH).
- L1 cache: 64 KB (32 KB data + 32 KB instructions) per core.
- L2 cache: 256 KB per core.
- Models with Iris Pro 6200 iGPU also feature 128 MB of eDRAM, acting as L4 cache.
- Fabrication process: 14 nm.

Processor branding	Model	Cores (Threads)	Clock rate (GHz)		Integrated GPU		Smart Cache	TDP	Release date
Processor branding	Model	Cores (Threads)	Base	Turbo	Model	Clock (MHz)	Smart Cache	TDP	Release date
Core i7	5950HQ	4 (8)	2.9	3.7	Iris Pro 6200	300–1150	6 MB	47 W	June 2015
Core i7	5850HQ	4 (8)	2.7	3.6	Iris Pro 6200	300–1100	6 MB	47 W	June 2015
Core i7	5750HQ	4 (8)	2.5	3.4	Iris Pro 6200	300–1050	6 MB	47 W	June 2015
Core i7	5700HQ	4 (8)	2.7	3.5	HD 5600	300–1050	6 MB	47 W	June 2015
Core i5	5350H	2 (4)	3.1	3.5	Iris Pro 6200	300–1050	4 MB	47 W	June 2015

== Core M (5th gen) ==
=== Broadwell-Y ===
Common features:

- Socket: BGA 1234.
- All the CPUs support dual-channel DDR3L, DDR3L-RS or LPDDR3 RAM, at up to 1600 MT/s speed.
- All CPU models provide 12 lanes of PCIe 2.0.
- All CPUs feature a DMI 2.0 bus to the chipset (PCH).
- L1 cache: 64 KB (32 KB data + 32 KB instructions) per core.
- L2 cache: 256 KB per core.
- Fabrication process: 14 nm.

Processor branding	Model	Cores (Threads)	Clock rate (GHz)		Integrated GPU		Smart Cache	TDP	Release date
Processor branding	Model	Cores (Threads)	Base	Turbo	Model	Clock (MHz)	Smart Cache	TDP	Release date
Core M	5Y71	2 (4)	1.2	2.9	HD 5300	300–900	4 MB	4.5 W	October 2014
Core M	5Y70	2 (4)	1.1	2.6	HD 5300	100–850	4 MB	4.5 W	September 2014
Core M	5Y51	2 (4)	1.1	2.6	HD 5300	300–900	4 MB	4.5 W	October 2014
Core M	5Y31	2 (4)	0.9	2.4	HD 5300	300–850	4 MB	4.5 W	October 2014
Core M	5Y10c	2 (4)	0.8	2.0	HD 5300	300–800	4 MB	4.5 W	October 2014
Core M	5Y10a	2 (4)	0.8	2.0	HD 5300	100–800	4 MB	4.5 W	September 2014
Core M	5Y10	2 (4)	0.8	2.0	HD 5300	100–800	4 MB	4.5 W	September 2014

== Core i (6th gen) ==
=== Skylake-U ===
Common features:

- Socket: BGA 1356.
- All the CPUs support dual-channel DDR4-2133, DDR3L-1600 or LPDDR3-1866 RAM.
- All CPU models provide 12 lanes of PCIe 3.0.
- All CPUs feature a DMI 3.0 bus to the chipset (PCH).
- L1 cache: 64 KB (32 KB data + 32 KB instructions) per core.
- L2 cache: 256 KB per core.
- Fabrication process: 14 nm.

Processor branding	Model	Cores (Threads)	Clock rate (GHz)		Integrated GPU		Smart Cache	TDP	Release date
Processor branding	Model	Cores (Threads)	Base	Turbo	Model	Clock (MHz)	Smart Cache	TDP	Release date
Core i7	6660U	2 (4)	2.4	3.4	Iris 540	300–1050	4 MB	15 W	March 2016
Core i7	6650U	2 (4)	2.2	3.4	Iris 540	300–1050	4 MB	15 W	September 2015
Core i7	6600U	2 (4)	2.6	3.4	HD 520	300–1050	4 MB	15 W	September 2015
Core i7	6567U	2 (4)	3.3	3.6	Iris 550	300–1100	4 MB	28 W	September 2015
Core i7	6560U	2 (4)	2.2	3.2	Iris 540	300–1050	4 MB	15 W	September 2015
Core i7	6500U	2 (4)	2.5	3.1	HD 520	300–1050	4 MB	15 W	September 2015
Core i7	6498DU	2 (4)	2.5	3.1	HD 510	300–1050	4 MB	15 W	December 2015
Core i5	6360U	2 (4)	2.0	3.1	Iris 540	300–1000	3 MB	15 W	September 2015
Core i5	6300U	2 (4)	2.4	3.0	HD 520	300–1000	3 MB	15 W	September 2015
Core i5	6287U	2 (4)	3.1	3.5	Iris 550	300–1100	4 MB	28 W	September 2015
Core i5	6267U	2 (4)	2.9	3.3	Iris 550	300–1050	4 MB	28 W	September 2015
Core i5	6260U	2 (4)	1.8	2.9	Iris 540	300–950	4 MB	15 W	September 2015
Core i5	6200U	2 (4)	2.3	2.8	HD 520	300–1000	3 MB	15 W	September 2015
Core i5	6198DU	2 (4)	2.3	2.8	HD 510	300–1000	3 MB	15 W	December 2015
Core i3	6167U	2 (4)	2.7	—N/a	Iris 550	300–1000	3 MB	28 W	December 2015
Core i3	6157U	2 (4)	2.4	—N/a	Iris 550	300–1000	3 MB	28 W	September 2016
Core i3	6100U	2 (4)	2.3	—N/a	HD 520	300–1000	3 MB	15 W	September 2015
Core i3	6006U	2 (4)	2.0	—N/a	HD 520	300–900	3 MB	15 W	November 2016

=== Skylake-H ===
Common features:

- Socket: BGA 1440.
- All the CPUs support dual-channel DDR4-2133, DDR3L-1600 or LPDDR3-1866 RAM.
- All CPU models provide 16 lanes of PCIe 3.0.
- All CPUs feature a DMI 3.0 bus to the chipset (PCH).
- L1 cache: 64 KB (32 KB data + 32 KB instructions) per core.
- L2 cache: 256 KB per core.
- Models with Iris Pro 580 iGPU also feature 128 MB of eDRAM, acting as L4 cache.
- Fabrication process: 14 nm.
- K-suffix processors have an unlocked multiplier, allowing it to be overclocked.

Processor branding	Model	Cores (Threads)	Clock rate (GHz)		Integrated GPU		Smart Cache	TDP	Release date
Processor branding	Model	Cores (Threads)	Base	Turbo	Model	Clock (MHz)	Smart Cache	TDP	Release date
Core i7	6970HQ	4 (8)	2.8	3.7	Iris Pro 580	350–1050	8 MB	45 W	January 2016
Core i7	6920HQ	4 (8)	2.9	3.8	HD 530	350–1050	8 MB	45 W	September 2015
Core i7	6870HQ	4 (8)	2.7	3.6	Iris Pro 580	350–1000	8 MB	45 W	January 2016
Core i7	6820HQ	4 (8)	2.7	3.6	HD 530	350–1050	8 MB	45 W	September 2015
Core i7	6820HK	4 (8)	2.7	3.6	HD 530	350–1050	8 MB	45 W	September 2015
Core i7	6770HQ	4 (8)	2.6	3.5	Iris Pro 580	350–950	6 MB	45 W	January 2016
Core i7	6700HQ	4 (8)	2.6	3.5	HD 530	350–1050	6 MB	45 W	September 2015
Core i5	6440HQ	4 (4)	2.6	3.5	HD 530	350–950	6 MB	45 W	September 2015
Core i5	6350HQ	4 (4)	2.3	3.2	Iris Pro 580	350–900	6 MB	45 W	February 2016
Core i5	6300HQ	4 (4)	2.3	3.2	HD 530	350–950	6 MB	45 W	September 2015
Core i3	6100H	2 (4)	2.7	—N/a	HD 530	350–900	3 MB	35 W	September 2015

== Core M (6th gen) ==
=== Skylake-Y ===
Common features:

- Socket: BGA 1515.
- All the CPUs support dual-channel DDR3L-1600 or LPDDR3-1866 RAM.
- All CPU models provide 10 lanes of PCIe 3.0.
- All CPUs feature a DMI 3.0 bus to the chipset (PCH).
- L1 cache: 64 KB (32 KB data + 32 KB instructions) per core.
- L2 cache: 256 KB per core.
- Fabrication process: 14 nm.

Processor branding	Model	Cores (Threads)	Clock rate (GHz)		Integrated GPU		Smart Cache	TDP	Release date
Processor branding	Model	Cores (Threads)	Base	Turbo	Model	Clock (MHz)	Smart Cache	TDP	Release date
Core m7	6Y75	2 (4)	1.2	3.1	HD 515	300–1000	4 MB	4.5 W	September 2015
Core m5	6Y57	2 (4)	1.1	2.8	HD 515	300–900	4 MB	4.5 W	September 2015
Core m5	6Y54	2 (4)	1.1	2.7	HD 515	300–900	4 MB	4.5 W	September 2015
Core m3	6Y30	2 (4)	0.9	2.2	HD 515	300–850	4 MB	4.5 W	September 2015

== Core i (7th gen) ==
=== Kaby Lake-U ===
Common features:

- Socket: BGA 1356.
- All the CPUs support dual-channel DDR4-2133, DDR3L-1600 or LPDDR3-1866 RAM.
- All CPU models provide 12 lanes of PCIe 3.0.
- All CPUs feature a DMI 3.0 bus to the chipset (PCH).
- L1 cache: 64 KB (32 KB data + 32 KB instructions) per core.
- L2 cache: 256 KB per core.
- Fabrication process: 14 nm.

Processor branding	Model	Cores (Threads)	Clock rate (GHz)		Integrated GPU		Smart Cache	TDP	Release date
Processor branding	Model	Cores (Threads)	Base	Turbo	Model	Clock (MHz)	Smart Cache	TDP	Release date
Core i7	7660U	2 (4)	2.5	4.0	Iris Plus 640	300–1100	4 MB	15 W	January 2017
Core i7	7600U	2 (4)	2.8	3.9	HD 620	300–1150	4 MB	15 W	January 2017
Core i7	7567U	2 (4)	3.5	4.0	Iris Plus 650	300–1150	4 MB	28 W	January 2017
Core i7	7560U	2 (4)	2.4	3.8	Iris Plus 640	300–1050	4 MB	15 W	January 2017
Core i7	7500U	2 (4)	2.7	3.5	HD 620	300–1050	4 MB	15 W	September 2016
Core i5	7360U	2 (4)	2.3	3.6	Iris Plus 640	300–1000	4 MB	15 W	January 2017
Core i5	7300U	2 (4)	2.6	3.5	HD 620	300–1100	3 MB	15 W	January 2017
Core i5	7287U	2 (4)	3.3	3.7	Iris Plus 650	300–1100	4 MB	28 W	January 2017
Core i5	7267U	2 (4)	3.1	3.5	Iris Plus 650	300–1050	4 MB	28 W	January 2017
Core i5	7260U	2 (4)	2.2	3.4	Iris Plus 640	300–950	4 MB	15 W	January 2017
Core i5	7200U	2 (4)	2.5	3.1	HD 620	300–1000	3 MB	15 W	September 2016
Core i3	7167U	2 (4)	2.8	—N/a	Iris Plus 650	300–1000	3 MB	28 W	January 2017
Core i3	7130U	2 (4)	2.7	—N/a	HD 620	300–1000	3 MB	15 W	June 2017
Core i3	7100U	2 (4)	2.4	—N/a	HD 620	300–1000	3 MB	15 W	September 2016
Core i3	7020U	2 (4)	2.3	—N/a	HD 620	300–1000	3 MB	15 W	Q2 2018

=== Kaby Lake-H ===
Common features:

- Socket: BGA 1440.
- All the CPUs support dual-channel DDR4-2400, DDR3L-1600 or LPDDR3-2133 RAM.
- All CPU models provide 16 lanes of PCIe 3.0.
- All CPUs feature a DMI 3.0 bus to the chipset (PCH).
- L1 cache: 64 KB (32 KB data + 32 KB instructions) per core.
- L2 cache: 256 KB per core.
- Fabrication process: 14 nm.
- K-suffix processors have an unlocked multiplier, allowing it to be overclocked.

Processor branding	Model	Cores (Threads)	Clock rate (GHz)		Integrated GPU		Smart Cache	TDP	Release date
Processor branding	Model	Cores (Threads)	Base	Turbo	Model	Clock (MHz)	Smart Cache	TDP	Release date
Core i7	7920HQ	4 (8)	3.1	4.1	HD 630	350–1100	8 MB	45 W	January 2017
Core i7	7820HK	4 (8)	2.9	3.9	HD 630	350–1100	8 MB	45 W	January 2017
Core i7	7820HQ	4 (8)	2.9	3.9	HD 630	350–1100	8 MB	45 W	January 2017
Core i7	7700HQ	4 (8)	2.8	3.8	HD 630	350–1100	6 MB	45 W	January 2017
Core i5	7440HQ	4 (4)	2.8	3.8	HD 630	300–1000	6 MB	45 W	January 2017
Core i5	7300HQ	4 (4)	2.5	3.5	HD 630	300–1000	6 MB	45 W	January 2017
Core i3	7100H	2 (4)	3.0	—N/a	HD 630	300–950	3 MB	35 W	January 2017

=== Kaby Lake-Y ===
Common features:

- Socket: BGA 1515.
- All the CPUs support dual-channel LPDDR3-1866 or DDR3L-1600 RAM.
- All CPU models provide 10 lanes of PCIe 3.0.
- All CPUs feature a DMI 3.0 bus to the chipset (PCH).
- L1 cache: 64 KB (32 KB data + 32 KB instructions) per core.
- L2 cache: 256 KB per core.
- Fabrication process: 14 nm.

Processor branding	Model	Cores (Threads)	Clock rate (GHz)		Integrated GPU		Smart Cache	TDP	Release date
Processor branding	Model	Cores (Threads)	Base	Turbo	Model	Clock (MHz)	Smart Cache	TDP	Release date
Core i7	7Y75	2 (4)	1.3	3.6	HD 615	300–1050	4 MB	4.5 W	September 2016
Core i5	7Y57	2 (4)	1.2	3.3	HD 615	300–950	4 MB	4.5 W	January 2017
Core i5	7Y54	2 (4)	1.2	3.2	HD 615	300–950	4 MB	4.5 W	September 2016

== Core M (7th gen) ==
=== Kaby Lake-Y ===
Core m5 and Core m7 models were rebranded as Core i5 and Core i7.

Common features:

- Socket: BGA 1515.
- All the CPUs support dual-channel DDR3L-1600 or LPDDR3-1866 RAM.
- All CPU models provide 10 lanes of PCIe 3.0.
- All CPUs feature a DMI 3.0 bus to the chipset (PCH).
- L1 cache: 64 KB (32 KB data + 32 KB instructions) per core.
- L2 cache: 256 KB per core.
- Fabrication process: 14 nm.

Processor branding	Model	Cores (Threads)	Clock rate (GHz)		Integrated GPU		Smart Cache	TDP	Release date
Processor branding	Model	Cores (Threads)	Base	Turbo	Model	Clock (MHz)	Smart Cache	TDP	Release date
Core m3	7Y32	2 (4)	1.1	3.0	HD 615	300–900	4 MB	4.5 W	April 2017
Core m3	7Y30	2 (4)	1.0	2.6	HD 615	300–900	4 MB	4.5 W	September 2016

== Core i (8th gen) ==
=== Coffee Lake-U ===
Common features:

- Socket: BGA 1528.
- All the CPUs support dual-channel DDR4-2400 or LPDDR3-2133 RAM.
- All CPU models provide 16 lanes of PCIe 3.0.
- All CPUs feature a DMI 3.0 bus to the chipset (PCH).
- L1 cache: 64 KB (32 KB data + 32 KB instructions) per core.
- L2 cache: 256 KB per core.
- Fabrication process: 14 nm.

Processor branding	Model	Cores (Threads)	Clock rate (GHz)		Integrated GPU		Smart Cache	TDP	Release date
Processor branding	Model	Cores (Threads)	Base	Turbo	Model	Clock (MHz)	Smart Cache	TDP	Release date
Core i7	8569U	4 (8)	2.8	4.7	Iris Plus 655	300–1200	8 MB	28 W	May 2019
Core i7	8559U	4 (8)	2.7	4.5	Iris Plus 655	300–1200	8 MB	28 W	April 2018
Core i7	8557U	4 (8)	1.7	4.5	Iris Plus 645	300–1150	8 MB	15 W	July 2019
Core i5	8279U	4 (8)	2.4	4.1	Iris Plus 655	300–1150	6 MB	28 W	May 2019
Core i5	8269U	4 (8)	2.6	4.2	Iris Plus 655	300–1100	6 MB	28 W	April 2018
Core i5	8260U	4 (8)	1.6	3.9	UHD 620	300–1100	6 MB	15 W	Q4 2019
Core i5	8259U	4 (8)	2.3	3.8	Iris Plus 655	300–1050	6 MB	28 W	April 2018
Core i5	8257U	4 (8)	1.4	3.9	Iris Plus 645	300–1050	6 MB	15 W	July 2019
Core i3	8140U	2 (4)	2.1	3.9	UHD 620	300–1000	4 MB	15 W	Q4 2019
Core i3	8109U	2 (4)	3.0	3.6	Iris Plus 655	300–1050	4 MB	28 W	April 2018

=== Coffee Lake-H ===
Common features:

- Socket: BGA 1440.
- All the CPUs support dual-channel DDR4-2666 RAM. Models i5-8300H and above also support LPDDR3-2133 RAM.
- All CPU models provide 16 lanes of PCIe 3.0.
- All CPUs feature a DMI 3.0 bus to the chipset (PCH).
- L1 cache: 64 KB (32 KB data + 32 KB instructions) per core.
- L2 cache: 256 KB per core.
- Fabrication process: 14 nm.
- K-suffix processors have an unlocked multiplier, allowing it to be overclocked.

Processor branding	Model	Cores (Threads)	Clock rate (GHz)		Integrated GPU		Smart Cache	TDP	Release date
Processor branding	Model	Cores (Threads)	Base	Turbo	Model	Clock (MHz)	Smart Cache	TDP	Release date
Core i9	8950HK	6 (12)	2.9	4.8	UHD 630	350–1200	12 MB	45 W	April 2018
Core i7	8850H	6 (12)	2.6	4.3	UHD 630	350–1150	9 MB	45 W	April 2018
Core i7	8750H	6 (12)	2.2	4.1	UHD 630	350–1100	9 MB	45 W	April 2018
Core i5	8400H	4 (8)	2.5	4.2	UHD 630	350–1100	8 MB	45 W	April 2018
Core i5	8300H	4 (8)	2.3	4.0	UHD 630	350–1000	8 MB	45 W	April 2018
Core i3	8100H	4 (4)	3.0	—N/a	UHD 630	350–1000	6 MB	45 W	July 2018

=== Coffee Lake-B ===
Common features:

- Socket: BGA 1440.
- All the CPUs support dual-channel DDR4-2666 RAM.
- All CPU models provide 16 lanes of PCIe 3.0.
- All CPUs feature a DMI 3.0 bus to the chipset (PCH).
- L1 cache: 64 KB (32 KB data + 32 KB instructions) per core.
- L2 cache: 256 KB per core.
- Fabrication process: 14 nm.

Processor branding	Model	Cores (Threads)	Clock rate (GHz)		Integrated GPU		Smart Cache	TDP	Release date
Processor branding	Model	Cores (Threads)	Base	Turbo	Model	Clock (MHz)	Smart Cache	TDP	Release date
Core i7	8700B	6 (12)	3.2	4.6	UHD 630	350–1200	12 MB	65 W	April 2018
Core i5	8500B	6 (6)	3.0	4.1	UHD 630	350–1100	9 MB	65 W	April 2018
Core i5	8400B	6 (6)	2.8	4.0	UHD 630	350–1050	9 MB	65 W	April 2018
Core i3	8100B	4 (4)	3.6	—N/a	UHD 630	350–1050	6 MB	65 W	Q3 2018

=== Kaby Lake Refresh ===
Common features:

- Socket: BGA 1356.
- All the CPUs support dual-channel DDR4-2400 or LPDDR3-2133 RAM.
- All CPU models provide 12 lanes of PCIe 3.0.
- All CPUs feature a DMI 3.0 bus to the chipset (PCH).
- L1 cache: 64 KB (32 KB data + 32 KB instructions) per core.
- L2 cache: 256 KB per core.
- Fabrication process: 14 nm.

Processor branding	Model	Cores (Threads)	Clock rate (GHz)		Integrated GPU		Smart Cache	TDP	Release date
Processor branding	Model	Cores (Threads)	Base	Turbo	Model	Clock (MHz)	Smart Cache	TDP	Release date
Core i7	8650U	4 (8)	1.9	4.2	UHD 620	300–1150	8 MB	15 W	August 2017
Core i7	8550U	4 (8)	1.8	4.0	UHD 620	300–1150	8 MB	15 W	August 2017
Core i5	8350U	4 (8)	1.7	3.6	UHD 620	300–1100	6 MB	15 W	August 2017
Core i5	8250U	4 (8)	1.6	3.4	UHD 620	300–1100	6 MB	15 W	August 2017
Core i3	8130U	2 (4)	2.2	3.4	UHD 620	300–1000	4 MB	15 W	February 2018

=== Kaby Lake-G ===
Common features:

- Socket: BGA 2270.
- All the CPUs support dual-channel DDR4-2400 RAM.
- All CPU models provide 8 lanes of PCIe 3.0.
- All CPUs feature a DMI 3.0 bus to the chipset (PCH).
- Kaby Lake-G CPUs have an embedded discrete Radeon RX Vega M GPU as listed in the table below, which have HBM2 VRAM also embedded on the CPU package.
- L1 cache: 64 KB (32 KB data + 32 KB instructions) per core.
- L2 cache: 256 KB per core.
- Fabrication process: 14 nm.

Processor branding	Model	Cores (Threads)	Clock rate (GHz)		Integrated GPU		Embedded dGPU		Smart Cache	TDP	Release date
Processor branding	Model	Cores (Threads)	Base	Turbo	Model	Clock (MHz)	Model	Clock (MHz)	Smart Cache	TDP	Release date
Core i7	8809G	4 (8)	3.1	4.2	HD 630	350–1100	RX Vega M GH	1063–1190	8 MB	100 W	February 2018
Core i7	8709G	4 (8)	3.1	4.1	HD 630	350–1100	RX Vega M GH	1063–1190	8 MB	100 W	February 2018
Core i7	8706G	4 (8)	3.1	4.1	HD 630	350–1100	RX Vega M GL	931–1011	8 MB	65 W	February 2018
Core i7	8705G	4 (8)	3.1	4.1	HD 630	350–1100	RX Vega M GL	931–1011	8 MB	65 W	February 2018
Core i5	8305G	4 (8)	2.8	3.2	HD 630	350–1000	RX Vega M GL	931–1011	6 MB	65 W	February 2018

=== Amber Lake-Y ===
Common features:

- Socket: BGA 1515.
- All the CPUs support dual-channel LPDDR3-1866 or DDR3L-1600 RAM.
- All CPU models provide 10 lanes of PCIe 3.0.
- All CPUs feature a DMI 3.0 bus to the chipset (PCH).
- L1 cache: 64 KB (32 KB data + 32 KB instructions) per core.
- L2 cache: 256 KB per core.
- Fabrication process: 14 nm.

Processor branding	Model	Cores (Threads)	Clock rate (GHz)		Integrated GPU		Smart Cache	TDP	Release date
Processor branding	Model	Cores (Threads)	Base	Turbo	Model	Clock (MHz)	Smart Cache	TDP	Release date
Core i7	8500Y	2 (4)	1.5	4.2	UHD 615	300–1050	4 MB	5 W	August 2018
Core i5	8310Y	2 (4)	1.6	3.9	UHD 617	300–1050	4 MB	7 W	Q1 2019
Core i5	8210Y	2 (4)	1.6	3.6	UHD 617	300–1050	4 MB	7 W	October 2018
Core i5	8200Y	2 (4)	1.3	3.9	UHD 615	300–950	4 MB	5 W	August 2018

=== Whiskey Lake-U ===
Common features:

- Socket: BGA 1528.
- All the CPUs support dual-channel DDR4-2400 or LPDDR3-2133 RAM.
- All CPU models provide 16 lanes of PCIe 3.0.
- All CPUs feature a DMI 3.0 bus to the chipset (PCH).
- L1 cache: 64 KB (32 KB data + 32 KB instructions) per core.
- L2 cache: 256 KB per core.
- Fabrication process: 14 nm.

Processor branding	Model	Cores (Threads)	Clock rate (GHz)		Integrated GPU		Smart Cache	TDP	Release date
Processor branding	Model	Cores (Threads)	Base	Turbo	Model	Clock (MHz)	Smart Cache	TDP	Release date
Core i7	8665U	4 (8)	1.9	4.8	UHD 620	300–1150	8 MB	15 W	April 2019
Core i7	8565U	4 (8)	1.8	4.6	UHD 620	300–1150	8 MB	15 W	August 2018
Core i5	8365U	4 (8)	1.6	4.1	UHD 620	300–1100	6 MB	15 W	April 2019
Core i5	8265U	4 (8)	1.6	3.9	UHD 620	300–1100	6 MB	15 W	August 2018
Core i3	8145U	2 (4)	2.1	3.9	UHD 620	300–1000	4 MB	15 W	August 2018

=== Cannon Lake-U ===
Common features:

- Socket: BGA 1528.
- All the CPUs support dual-channel DDR4-2400 or LPDDR4(x)-2400 RAM.
- All CPU models provide 16 lanes of PCIe 3.0.
- All CPUs feature a DMI 3.0 bus to the chipset (PCH).
- L1 cache: 64 KB (32 KB data + 32 KB instructions) per core.
- L2 cache: 256 KB per core.
- Fabrication process: 10 nm.

Processor branding	Model	Cores (Threads)	Clock rate (GHz)		Integrated GPU		Smart Cache	TDP	Release date
Processor branding	Model	Cores (Threads)	Base	Turbo	Model	Clock (MHz)	Smart Cache	TDP	Release date
Core i3	8121U	2 (4)	2.2	3.2	—N/a		4 MB	15 W	May 2018

== Core M (8th gen) ==
=== Amber Lake-Y ===
Core m5 and Core m7 models were rebranded as Core i5 and Core i7.

Common features:

- Socket: BGA 1515.
- All the CPUs support dual-channel DDR3L-1600 or LPDDR3-1866 RAM.
- All CPU models provide 10 lanes of PCIe 3.0.
- All CPUs feature a DMI 3.0 bus to the chipset (PCH).
- L1 cache: 64 KB (32 KB data + 32 KB instructions) per core.
- L2 cache: 256 KB per core.
- Fabrication process: 14 nm.

Processor branding	Model	Cores (Threads)	Clock rate (GHz)		Integrated GPU		Smart Cache	TDP	Release date
Processor branding	Model	Cores (Threads)	Base	Turbo	Model	Clock (MHz)	Smart Cache	TDP	Release date
Core m3	8100Y	2 (4)	1.1	3.4	UHD 615	300–900	4 MB	5 W	August 2018

== Core i (9th gen) ==
=== Coffee Lake-H (refresh) ===
Common features:

- Socket: BGA 1440.
- All the CPUs support dual-channel DDR4-2666 or LPDDR3-2133 RAM.
- All CPU models provide 16 lanes of PCIe 3.0.
- All CPUs feature a DMI 3.0 bus to the chipset (PCH).
- L1 cache: 64 KB (32 KB data + 32 KB instructions) per core.
- L2 cache: 256 KB per core.
- Fabrication process: 14 nm.
- K-suffix processors have an unlocked multiplier, allowing it to be overclocked.

Processor branding	Model	Cores (Threads)	Clock rate (GHz)		Integrated GPU		Smart Cache	TDP	Release date
Processor branding	Model	Cores (Threads)	Base	Turbo	Model	Clock (MHz)	Smart Cache	TDP	Release date
Core i9	9980HK	8 (16)	2.4	5.0	UHD 630	350–1250	16 MB	45 W	April 2019
Core i9	9880H	8 (16)	2.3	4.8	UHD 630	350–1200	16 MB	45 W	April 2019
Core i7	9850H	6 (12)	2.6	4.6	UHD 630	350–1150	12 MB	45 W	April 2019
Core i7	9750H	6 (12)	2.6	4.5	UHD 630	350–1150	12 MB	45 W	April 2019
Core i7	9750HF	6 (12)	2.6	4.5	—N/a		12 MB	45 W	April 2019
Core i5	9400H	4 (8)	2.5	4.3	UHD 630	350–1100	8 MB	45 W	April 2019
Core i5	9300H	4 (8)	2.4	4.1	UHD 630	350–1050	8 MB	45 W	April 2019
Core i5	9300HF	4 (8)	2.4	4.1	—N/a		8 MB	45 W	April 2019

== Core i (10th gen) ==
=== Comet Lake-U ===
Common features:

- Socket: BGA 1528.
- All the CPUs support dual-channel DDR4-2666, LPDDR4-2933 or LPDDR3-2133 RAM.
- All CPU models provide 16 lanes of PCIe 3.0.
- All CPUs feature a DMI 3.0 bus to the chipset (PCH).
- L1 cache: 64 KB (32 KB data + 32 KB instructions) per core.
- L2 cache: 256 KB per core.
- Fabrication process: 14 nm.

Processor branding	Model	Cores (Threads)	Clock rate (GHz)		Integrated GPU		Smart Cache	TDP	Release date
Processor branding	Model	Cores (Threads)	Base	Turbo	Model	Clock (MHz)	Smart Cache	TDP	Release date
Core i7	10810U	6 (12)	1.1	4.7	UHD 620	300–1150	12 MB	15 W	May 2020
Core i7	10710U	6 (12)	1.1	4.7	UHD 620	300–1150	12 MB	15 W	August 2019
Core i7	10610U	4 (8)	1.8	4.9	UHD 620	300–1150	8 MB	15 W	May 2020
Core i7	10510U	4 (8)	1.8	4.9	UHD 620	300–1150	8 MB	15 W	August 2019
Core i5	10310U	4 (8)	1.7	4.4	UHD 620	300–1150	6 MB	15 W	May 2020
Core i5	10210U	4 (8)	1.6	4.2	UHD 620	300–1100	6 MB	15 W	August 2019
Core i3	10110U	2 (4)	2.1	4.1	UHD 620	300–1000	4 MB	15 W	August 2019

=== Comet Lake-H ===
Common features:

- Socket: BGA 1440.
- All the CPUs support dual-channel DDR4 RAM, at up to 2933 MT/s speed.
- All CPU models provide 16 lanes of PCIe 3.0.
- All CPUs feature a DMI 3.0 bus to the chipset (PCH).
- L1 cache: 64 KB (32 KB data + 32 KB instructions) per core.
- L2 cache: 256 KB per core.
- Fabrication process: 14 nm.
- K-suffix processors have an unlocked multiplier, allowing it to be overclocked.

Processor branding	Model	Cores (Threads)	Clock rate (GHz)			Integrated GPU		Smart Cache	TDP	Release date
Processor branding	Model	Cores (Threads)	Base	Turbo	TVB	Model	Clock (MHz)	Smart Cache	TDP	Release date
Core i9	10980HK	8 (16)	2.4	5.1	5.3	UHD 630	350–1250	16 MB	45 W	April 2020
Core i9	10885H	8 (16)	2.4	5.1	5.3	UHD 630	350–1250	16 MB	45 W	May 2020
Core i7	10875H	8 (16)	2.3	4.9	5.1	UHD 630	350–1200	16 MB	45 W	April 2020
Core i7	10870H	8 (16)	2.2	4.8	5.0	UHD 630	350–1200	16 MB	45 W	September 2020
Core i7	10850H	6 (12)	2.7	4.9	5.1	UHD 630	350–1150	12 MB	45 W	April 2020
Core i7	10750H	6 (12)	2.6	4.8	5.0	UHD 630	350–1150	12 MB	45 W	April 2020
Core i5	10500H	6 (12)	2.5	4.5	—N/a	UHD 630	350–1050	12 MB	45 W	December 2020
Core i5	10400H	4 (8)	2.6	4.6	—N/a	UHD 630	350–1100	8 MB	45 W	April 2020
Core i5	10300H	4 (8)	2.5	4.5	—N/a	UHD 630	350–1050	8 MB	45 W	April 2020
Core i5	10200H	4 (8)	2.4	4.1	—N/a	UHD 630	350–1050	8 MB	45 W	August 2020

=== Ice Lake-U ===
Common features:

- Socket: BGA 1526, except for models with 'N' in the name which use a smaller BGA 1344 package.
- All the CPUs support dual-channel DDR4-3200 or LPDDR4-3733 RAM.
- PCIe 3.0 support.
- All CPUs feature a DMI 3.0 bus to the chipset (PCH).
- L1 cache: 80 KB (48 KB data + 32 KB instructions) per core.
- L2 cache: 512 KB per core.
- Fabrication process: 10 nm.

Processor branding	Model	Cores (Threads)	Clock rate (GHz)		Integrated GPU		Smart Cache	TDP	Release date
Processor branding	Model	Cores (Threads)	Base	Turbo	Model	Clock (MHz)	Smart Cache	TDP	Release date
Core i7	1068NG7	4 (8)	2.3	4.1	Iris Plus (G7)	300–1100	8 MB	28 W	May 2020
Core i7	1068G7	4 (8)	2.3	4.1	Iris Plus (G7)	300–1100	8 MB	28 W	August 2019
Core i7	1065G7	4 (8)	1.3	3.9	Iris Plus (G7)	300–1100	8 MB	15 W	August 2019
Core i5	1038NG7	4 (8)	2.0	3.8	Iris Plus (G7)	300–1050	6 MB	28 W	May 2020
Core i5	1035G7	4 (8)	1.2	3.7	Iris Plus (G7)	300–1050	6 MB	15 W	August 2019
Core i5	1035G4	4 (8)	1.1	3.7	Iris Plus (G4)	300–1050	6 MB	15 W	August 2019
Core i5	1035G1	4 (8)	1.0	3.6	UHD Graphics (G1)	300–1050	6 MB	15 W	August 2019
Core i3	1005G1	2 (4)	1.2	3.4	UHD Graphics (G1)	300–900	4 MB	15 W	August 2019

=== Ice Lake-Y ===
Common features:

- Socket: BGA 1377, except for models with 'N' in the name which use a smaller BGA 1044 package.
- All the CPUs support dual-channel LPDDR4 RAM, at up to 3733 MT/s speed.
- PCIe 3.0 support.
- All CPUs feature a DMI 3.0 bus to the chipset (PCH).
- L1 cache: 80 KB (48 KB data + 32 KB instructions) per core.
- L2 cache: 512 KB per core.
- Fabrication process: 10 nm.

Processor branding	Model	Cores (Threads)	Clock rate (GHz)		Integrated GPU		Smart Cache	TDP	Release date
Processor branding	Model	Cores (Threads)	Base	Turbo	Model	Clock (MHz)	Smart Cache	TDP	Release date
Core i7	1060G7	4 (8)	1.0	3.8	Iris Plus (G7)	300–1100	8 MB	9 W	Q3 2019
Core i5	1030NG7	4 (8)	1.1	3.5	Iris Plus (G7)	300–1050	6 MB	10 W	Q2 2020
Core i5	1030G7	4 (8)	0.8	3.5	Iris Plus (G7)	300–1050	6 MB	9 W	Q3 2019
Core i5	1030G4	4 (8)	0.7	3.5	Iris Plus (G4)	300–1050	6 MB	9 W	Q3 2019
Core i3	1000NG4	2 (4)	1.1	3.2	Iris Plus (G4)	300–900	4 MB	9 W	Q2 2020
Core i3	1000G4	2 (4)	1.1	3.2	Iris Plus (G4)	300–900	4 MB	9 W	Q3 2019
Core i3	1000G1	2 (4)	1.1	3.2	UHD Graphics (G1)	300–900	4 MB	9 W	Q3 2019

=== Amber Lake-Y (10xxx) ===
Common features:

- Socket: BGA 1377, except for i3-10100Y which uses BGA 1515.
- All the CPUs support dual-channel DDR3L-1600 or LPDDR3-1866 RAM. Models i3-10110Y and up support LPDDR3 at up to 2133 MT/s speed.
- All CPU models provide 10 lanes of PCIe 3.0.
- All CPUs feature a DMI 3.0 bus to the chipset (PCH).
- L1 cache: 64 KB (32 KB data + 32 KB instructions) per core.
- L2 cache: 256 KB per core.
- Fabrication process: 14 nm.

Processor branding	Model	Cores (Threads)	Clock rate (GHz)		Integrated GPU		Smart Cache	TDP	Release date
Processor branding	Model	Cores (Threads)	Base	Turbo	Model	Clock (MHz)	Smart Cache	TDP	Release date
Core i7	10510Y	4 (8)	1.2	4.5	UHD 620	300–1150	8 MB	7 W	August 2019
Core i5	10310Y	4 (8)	1.1	4.1	UHD 620	300–1050	6 MB	7 W	August 2019
Core i5	10210Y	4 (8)	1.0	4.0	UHD 620	300–1050	6 MB	7 W	August 2019
Core i3	10110Y	2 (4)	1.0	4.0	UHD 620	300–1000	4 MB	7 W	August 2019
Core i3	10100Y	2 (4)	1.3	3.9	UHD 615	300–1000	4 MB	5 W	January 2021

== Core i (11th gen) ==
=== Tiger Lake-UP3 ===
Common features:

- Socket: BGA 1449.
- All the CPUs support dual-channel DDR4-3200 or LPDDR4X-3733 RAM. i5 models and up support LPDDR4X at up to 4266 MT/s speed.
- All CPU models provide 4 lanes of PCIe 4.0, in addition to PCIe 3.0 provided by the on-package PCH.
- All CPUs feature a DMI 3.0 bus to the chipset (PCH).
- L1 cache: 80 KB (48 KB data + 32 KB instructions) per core.
- L2 cache: 1.25 MB per core.
- Fabrication process: 10 nm.
- The base clock speed that the CPU runs at corresponds with the configurable TDP (cTDP) setting chosen.

Processor branding	Model	Cores (Threads)	Clock rate (GHz)		Integrated GPU		Smart Cache	TDP	Release date
Processor branding	Model	Cores (Threads)	Base	Turbo	Model	Clock (MHz)	Smart Cache	TDP	Release date
Core i7	1195G7	4 (8)	1.3–2.9	5.0	Iris Xe (96 EU)	?–1400	12 MB	12–28 W	June 2021
Core i7	1185G7	4 (8)	1.2–3.0	4.8	Iris Xe (96 EU)	?–1350	12 MB	12–28 W	September 2020
Core i7	1165G7	4 (8)	1.2–2.8	4.7	Iris Xe (96 EU)	?–1300	12 MB	12–28 W	September 2020
Core i5	1155G7	4 (8)	1.0–2.5	4.5	Iris Xe (80 EU)	?–1350	8 MB	12–28 W	June 2021
Core i5	1145G7	4 (8)	1.1–2.6	4.4	Iris Xe (80 EU)	?–1300	8 MB	12–28 W	January 2021
Core i5	1135G7	4 (8)	0.9–2.4	4.2	Iris Xe (80 EU)	?–1300	8 MB	12–28 W	September 2020
Core i3	1125G4	4 (8)	0.9–2.0	3.7	UHD Graphics (48 EU)	?–1250	8 MB	12–28 W	Q1 2021
Core i3	1115G4	2 (4)	1.7–3.0	4.1	UHD Graphics (48 EU)	?–1250	6 MB	12–28 W	September 2020

=== Tiger Lake-UP4 ===
Common features:

- Socket: BGA 1598.
- All the CPUs support dual-channel LPDDR4X-4266 RAM.
- All CPU models provide 4 lanes of PCIe 4.0, in addition to PCIe 3.0 provided by the on-package PCH.
- All CPUs feature a DMI 3.0 bus to the chipset (PCH).
- L1 cache: 80 KB (48 KB data + 32 KB instructions) per core.
- L2 cache: 1.25 MB per core.
- Fabrication process: 10 nm.
- The base clock speed that the CPU runs at corresponds with the configurable TDP (cTDP) setting chosen.

Processor branding	Model	Cores (Threads)	Clock rate (GHz)		Integrated GPU		Smart Cache	TDP	Release date
Processor branding	Model	Cores (Threads)	Base	Turbo	Model	Clock (MHz)	Smart Cache	TDP	Release date
Core i7	1180G7	4 (8)	0.9–2.2	4.6	Iris Xe (96 EU)	?–1100	12 MB	7–15 W	January 2021
Core i7	1160G7	4 (8)	0.9–2.1	4.4	Iris Xe (96 EU)	?–1100	12 MB	7–15 W	September 2020
Core i5	1140G7	4 (8)	0.8–1.8	4.2	Iris Xe (80 EU)	?–1100	8 MB	7–15 W	January 2021
Core i5	1130G7	4 (8)	0.8–1.8	4.0	Iris Xe (80 EU)	?–1100	8 MB	7–15 W	September 2020
Core i3	1120G4	4 (8)	0.8–1.5	3.5	UHD Graphics (48 EU)	?–1100	8 MB	7–15 W	Q1 2021
Core i3	1110G4	2 (4)	1.8	3.9	UHD Graphics (48 EU)	?–1100	6 MB	7–15 W	September 2020

=== Tiger Lake-H ===
Common features:

- Socket: BGA 1787.
- All the CPUs support dual-channel DDR4-3200 RAM.
- All CPU models provide 20 lanes of PCIe 4.0, in addition to 24 lanes of PCIe 3.0 provided by the on-package PCH.
- All CPUs feature a DMI 3.0 8-lane bus to the chipset (PCH).
- L1 cache: 80 KB (48 KB data + 32 KB instructions) per core.
- L2 cache: 1.25 MB per core.
- Fabrication process: 10 nm.
- The base clock speed that the CPU runs at corresponds with the configurable TDP (cTDP) setting chosen.
- K-suffix processors have an unlocked multiplier, allowing it to be overclocked.

Processor branding	Model	Cores (Threads)	Clock rate (GHz)		Integrated GPU		Smart Cache	TDP	Release date
Processor branding	Model	Cores (Threads)	Base	Turbo	Model	Clock (MHz)	Smart Cache	TDP	Release date
Core i9	11980HK	8 (16)	2.6–3.3	5.0	UHD Graphics (32 EU)	350–1450	24 MB	45–65 W	May 2021
Core i9	11950H	8 (16)	2.1–2.6	5.0	UHD Graphics (32 EU)	350–1450	24 MB	35–45 W	May 2021
Core i9	11900H	8 (16)	2.1–2.5	4.9	UHD Graphics (32 EU)	350–1450	24 MB	35–45 W	May 2021
Core i7	11850H	8 (16)	2.1–2.5	4.8	UHD Graphics (32 EU)	350–1450	24 MB	35–45 W	May 2021
Core i7	11800H	8 (16)	1.9–2.3	4.6	UHD Graphics (32 EU)	350–1450	24 MB	35–45 W	May 2021
Core i7	11600H	6 (12)	2.5–2.9	4.6	UHD Graphics (32 EU)	350–1450	18 MB	35–45 W	July 2021
Core i5	11500H	6 (12)	2.4–2.9	4.6	UHD Graphics (32 EU)	350–1450	12 MB	35–45 W	May 2021
Core i5	11400H	6 (12)	2.2–2.7	4.5	UHD Graphics (16 EU)	350–1450	12 MB	35–45 W	May 2021
Core i5	11260H	6 (12)	2.1–2.6	4.4	UHD Graphics (16 EU)	350–1400	12 MB	35–45 W	May 2021

=== Tiger Lake-H35 ===
Common features:

- Socket: BGA 1449.
- All the CPUs support dual-channel DDR4-3200 or LPDDR4X-4266 RAM.
- PCIe 4.0 support; 12× PCIe lanes provided by on-package PCH are revision 3.0.
- All CPUs feature a DMI 3.0 bus to the chipset (PCH).
- L1 cache: 80 KB (48 KB data + 32 KB instructions) per core.
- L2 cache: 1.25 MB per core.
- Fabrication process: 10 nm.
- The base clock speed that the CPU runs at corresponds with the configurable TDP (cTDP) setting chosen.

Processor branding	Model	Cores (Threads)	Clock rate (GHz)		Integrated GPU		Smart Cache	TDP	Release date
Processor branding	Model	Cores (Threads)	Base	Turbo	Model	Clock (MHz)	Smart Cache	TDP	Release date
Core i7	11390H	4 (8)	2.9–3.4	5.0	Iris Xe (96 EU)	?–1400	12 MB	28–35 W	June 2021
Core i7	11375H	4 (8)	3.0–3.3	5.0	Iris Xe (96 EU)	?–1350	12 MB	28–35 W	January 2021
Core i7	11370H	4 (8)	3.0–3.3	4.8	Iris Xe (96 EU)	?–1350	12 MB	28–35 W	January 2021
Core i5	11320H	4 (8)	2.5–3.2	4.5	Iris Xe (96 EU)	?–1350	8 MB	28–35 W	June 2021
Core i5	11300H	4 (8)	2.6–3.1	4.4	Iris Xe (80 EU)	?–1300	8 MB	28–35 W	January 2021

== Core i (12th gen) ==
=== Alder Lake-U ===
Common features:

- Socket: BGA 1781 (ix-12x0U), BGA 1744 (ix-12x5U).
- All the CPUs support dual-channel LPDDR5-5200 or LPDDR4X-4266 RAM. ix-12x5U models also support dual-channel DDR5-4800 and DDR4-3200 RAM in addition.
- ix-12x0 models provide 4 lanes of PCIe 4.0 and 8 lanes of PCIe 3.0, while ix-12x5U models provide 8 lanes of PCIe 4.0 and 12 lanes of PCIe 3.0.
- All CPUs feature a DMI 4.0 8-lane bus to the chipset (PCH).
- L1 cache:
  - P-cores: 80 KB (48 KB data + 32 KB instructions) per core.
  - E-cores: 96 KB (64 KB data + 32 KB instructions) per core.
- L2 cache:
  - P-cores: 1.25 MB per core.
  - E-cores: 2 MB per E-core cluster (each "cluster" contains four cores).
- Fabrication process: Intel 7.

Processor branding	Model	P-core (performance)			E-core (efficiency)			Integrated GPU		Smart Cache	TDP		Release date
Processor branding	Model	Cores (Threads)	Clock rate (GHz)		Cores (Threads)	Clock rate (GHz)		Model	Clock (MHz)	Smart Cache	Base	Max. Turbo	Release date
Processor branding	Model	Cores (Threads)	Base	Turbo	Cores (Threads)	Base	Turbo	Model	Clock (MHz)	Smart Cache	Base	Max. Turbo	Release date
Core i7	1265U	2 (4)	1.8	4.8	8 (8)	1.3	3.6	Iris Xe (96 EU)	?–1250	12 MB	15 W	55 W	February 2022
Core i7	1260U	2 (4)	1.6	4.7	8 (8)	0.8	3.5	Iris Xe (96 EU)	?–950	12 MB	9 W	29 W	February 2022
Core i7	1255U	2 (4)	1.7	4.7	8 (8)	1.2	3.5	Iris Xe (96 EU)	?–1250	12 MB	15 W	55 W	February 2022
Core i7	1250U	2 (4)	1.1	4.7	8 (8)	0.8	3.5	Iris Xe (96 EU)	?–950	12 MB	9 W	29 W	February 2022
Core i5	1245U	2 (4)	1.6	4.4	8 (8)	1.2	3.3	Iris Xe (80 EU)	?–1200	12 MB	15 W	55 W	February 2022
Core i5	1240U	2 (4)	1.1	4.4	8 (8)	0.8	3.3	Iris Xe (80 EU)	?–900	12 MB	9 W	29 W	February 2022
Core i5	1235U	2 (4)	1.3	4.4	8 (8)	0.9	3.3	Iris Xe (80 EU)	?–1200	12 MB	15 W	55 W	February 2022
Core i5	1230U	2 (4)	1.0	4.4	8 (8)	0.7	3.3	Iris Xe (80 EU)	?–850	12 MB	9 W	29 W	February 2022
Core i3	1215U	2 (4)	1.2	4.4	4 (4)	0.9	3.3	UHD Graphics (64 EU)	?–1100	10 MB	15 W	55 W	February 2022
Core i3	1210U	2 (4)	1.0	4.4	4 (4)	0.7	3.3	UHD Graphics (64 EU)	?–850	10 MB	9 W	29 W	February 2022

=== Alder Lake-P ===
Common features:

- Socket: BGA 1744.
- All the CPUs support dual-channel DDR5-4800, DDR4-3200, LPDDR5-5200 or LPDDR4X-4266 RAM.
- All CPU models provide 8 lanes of PCIe 4.0 and 12 lanes of PCIe 3.0.
- All CPUs feature a DMI 4.0 8-lane bus to the chipset (PCH).
- L1 cache:
  - P-cores: 80 KB (48 KB data + 32 KB instructions) per core.
  - E-cores: 96 KB (64 KB data + 32 KB instructions) per core.
- L2 cache:
  - P-cores: 1.25 MB per core.
  - E-cores: 2 MB per E-core cluster (each "cluster" contains four cores).
- Fabrication process: Intel 7.
- The following models are available with IPU (image processing unit): i5-1235U, i3-1215U. Specifications between them and the respective processor without IPU are completely identical, apart from the addition of the IPU.

Processor branding	Model	P-core (performance)			E-core (efficiency)			Integrated GPU		Smart Cache	TDP		Release date
Processor branding	Model	Cores (Threads)	Clock rate (GHz)		Cores (Threads)	Clock rate (GHz)		Model	Clock (MHz)	Smart Cache	Base	Max. Turbo	Release date
Processor branding	Model	Cores (Threads)	Base	Turbo	Cores (Threads)	Base	Turbo	Model	Clock (MHz)	Smart Cache	Base	Max. Turbo	Release date
Core i7	1280P	6 (12)	1.8	4.8	8 (8)	1.3	3.6	Iris Xe (96 EU)	?–1450	24 MB	28 W	64 W	February 2022
Core i7	1270P	4 (8)	2.2	4.8	8 (8)	1.6	3.5	Iris Xe (96 EU)	?–1400	18 MB	28 W	64 W	February 2022
Core i7	1260P	4 (8)	2.1	4.7	8 (8)	1.5	3.4	Iris Xe (96 EU)	?–1400	18 MB	28 W	64 W	February 2022
Core i5	1250P	4 (8)	1.7	4.4	8 (8)	1.2	3.3	Iris Xe (80 EU)	?–1400	12 MB	28 W	64 W	February 2022
Core i5	1240P	4 (8)	1.7	4.4	8 (8)	1.2	3.3	Iris Xe (80 EU)	?–1300	12 MB	28 W	64 W	February 2022
Core i3	1220P	2 (4)	1.5	4.4	8 (8)	1.1	3.3	UHD Graphics (64 EU)	?–1100	12 MB	28 W	64 W	February 2022

=== Alder Lake-H ===
Common features:

- Socket: BGA 1744.
- All the CPUs support dual-channel DDR5-4800, DDR4-3200, LPDDR5-5200 or LPDDR4X-4266 RAM.
- All CPU models provide 16 lanes of PCIe 4.0, in addition to 12 lanes of PCIe 3.0 provided by the on-package PCH.
- All CPUs feature a DMI 4.0 8-lane bus to the chipset (PCH).
- L1 cache:
  - P-cores: 80 KB (48 KB data + 32 KB instructions) per core.
  - E-cores: 96 KB (64 KB data + 32 KB instructions) per core.
- L2 cache:
  - P-cores: 1.25 MB per core.
  - E-cores: 2 MB per E-core cluster (each "cluster" contains four cores).
- Fabrication process: Intel 7.
- K-suffix processors have an unlocked multiplier, allowing it to be overclocked.

Processor branding	Model	P-core (performance)			E-core (efficiency)			Integrated GPU		Smart Cache	TDP		Release date
Processor branding	Model	Cores (Threads)	Clock rate (GHz)		Cores (Threads)	Clock rate (GHz)		Model	Clock (MHz)	Smart Cache	Base	Max. Turbo	Release date
Processor branding	Model	Cores (Threads)	Base	Turbo	Cores (Threads)	Base	Turbo	Model	Clock (MHz)	Smart Cache	Base	Max. Turbo	Release date
Core i9	12900HK	6 (12)	2.5	5.0	8 (8)	1.8	3.8	Iris Xe (96 EU)	?–1450	24 MB	45 W	115 W	January 2022
Core i9	12900H	6 (12)	2.5	5.0	8 (8)	1.8	3.8	Iris Xe (96 EU)	?–1450	24 MB	45 W	115 W	January 2022
Core i7	12800H	6 (12)	2.4	4.8	8 (8)	1.8	3.7	Iris Xe (96 EU)	?–1400	24 MB	45 W	115 W	January 2022
Core i7	12700H	6 (12)	2.3	4.7	8 (8)	1.7	3.5	Iris Xe (96 EU)	?–1400	24 MB	45 W	115 W	January 2022
Core i7	12650H	6 (12)	2.3	4.7	4 (4)	1.7	3.5	UHD Graphics (64 EU)	?–1400	24 MB	45 W	115 W	January 2022
Core i5	12600H	4 (8)	2.7	4.5	8 (8)	2.0	3.3	Iris Xe (80 EU)	?–1400	18 MB	45 W	95 W	January 2022
Core i5	12500H	4 (8)	2.5	4.5	8 (8)	1.8	3.3	Iris Xe (80 EU)	?–1300	18 MB	45 W	95 W	January 2022
Core i5	12450H	4 (8)	2.0	4.4	4 (4)	1.5	3.3	UHD Graphics (48 EU)	?–1200	12 MB	45 W	95 W	January 2022

=== Alder Lake-HX ===
Common features:

- Socket: BGA 1964.
- All the CPUs support dual-channel DDR5-4800 or DDR4-3200 RAM.
- All CPU models provide 16 lanes of PCIe 5.0 and 4 lanes of PCIe 4.0, in addition to 16 lanes of PCIe 4.0 and 12 lanes of PCIe 3.0 provided by the on-package PCH.
- All CPUs feature a DMI 4.0 8-lane bus to the on-package chipset (PCH).
- L1 cache:
  - P-cores: 80 KB (48 KB data + 32 KB instructions) per core.
  - E-cores: 96 KB (64 KB data + 32 KB instructions) per core.
- L2 cache:
  - P-cores: 1.25 MB per core.
  - E-cores: 2 MB per E-core cluster (each "cluster" contains four cores).
- Fabrication process: Intel 7.
- The i9 models have unlocked multipliers, allowing them to be overclocked.

Processor branding	Model	P-core (performance)			E-core (efficiency)			Integrated GPU		Smart Cache	TDP		Release date
Processor branding	Model	Cores (Threads)	Clock rate (GHz)		Cores (Threads)	Clock rate (GHz)		Model	Clock (MHz)	Smart Cache	Base	Max. Turbo	Release date
Processor branding	Model	Cores (Threads)	Base	Turbo	Cores (Threads)	Base	Turbo	Model	Clock (MHz)	Smart Cache	Base	Max. Turbo	Release date
Core i9	12950HX	8 (16)	2.3	5.0	8 (8)	1.7	3.6	UHD Graphics (32 EU)	?–1550	30 MB	55 W	157 W	May 2022
Core i9	12900HX	8 (16)	2.3	5.0	8 (8)	1.7	3.6	UHD Graphics (32 EU)	?–1550	30 MB	55 W	157 W	May 2022
Core i7	12850HX	8 (16)	2.1	4.8	8 (8)	1.5	3.4	UHD Graphics (32 EU)	?–1450	25 MB	55 W	157 W	May 2022
Core i7	12800HX	8 (16)	2.0	4.8	8 (8)	1.5	3.4	UHD Graphics (32 EU)	?–1450	25 MB	55 W	157 W	May 2022
Core i7	12650HX	6 (12)	2.0	4.7	8 (8)	1.5	3.3	UHD Graphics (32 EU)	?–1450	24 MB	55 W	157 W	May 2022
Core i5	12600HX	4 (8)	2.5	4.6	8 (8)	1.8	3.3	UHD Graphics (32 EU)	?–1350	18 MB	55 W	157 W	May 2022
Core i5	12450HX	4 (8)	2.4	4.4	4 (4)	1.8	3.1	UHD Graphics (16 EU)	?–1300	12 MB	55 W	157 W	May 2022

=== Alder Lake-N ===
These are essentially "E-core-only" CPUs, utilizing the Gracemont architecture.

Common features:

- Socket: BGA 1264.
- All the CPUs support single-channel DDR4-3200, DDR5-4800, or LPDDR5-4800 MT/s RAM.
  - The Intel N97 and Atom CPUs support 32GB while the rest only 16GB
- All CPU models provide 9 lanes of PCIe 3.0.
- All CPUs feature a DMI 4.0 8-lane bus to the chipset (PCH).
- L1 cache: 96 KB (64 KB data + 32 KB instructions) per core.
- L2 cache: 2 MB per cluster (each "cluster" contains four cores).
- Fabrication process: Intel 7 (Previously Intel 10nm).

Processor branding	Model	Cores (Threads)	Clock rate (GHz)		Integrated GPU		Smart Cache	TDP		Release date
Processor branding	Model	Cores (Threads)	Base	Turbo	Model	Clock (MHz)	Smart Cache	Base	Max. Turbo	Release date
Core i3	N305	8 (8)	1.8	3.8	UHD Graphics (32 EU)	1250	6 MB	15 W	35 W	January 2023
Core i3	N300	8 (8)	0.8	3.8	UHD Graphics (32 EU)	1250	6 MB	7 W	25 W	January 2023
Intel	N200	4 (4)		3.7	UHD Graphics (32 EU)	750	6 MB		6 W	January 2023
Intel	N100	4 (4)		3.4	24 EU	750	6 MB		6 W	January 2023
Intel	N97	4 (4)		3.6	24 EU	1200	6 MB		12 W	January 2023
Intel	N95	4 (4)		3.4	16 EU	1200	6 MB		15 W	January 2023
Atom	x7425E	4 (4)		3.4	24	1000	6 MB		12 W	January 2023
Atom	x7213E	2 (2)		3.2	16	1000	6 MB		10 W	January 2023
Atom	x7211E	2 (2)		3.2	16	1000	6 MB		6 W	January 2023

== Core i (13th gen) ==
=== Raptor Lake-U ===
Common features:

- Socket: BGA 1744.
- All the CPUs support dual-channel DDR5-5200, DDR4-3200, LPDDR5-6400 or LPDDR4X-4266 RAM.
- All CPU models provide 8 lanes of PCIe 4.0 and 12 lanes of PCIe 3.0.
- All CPUs feature a DMI 4.0 8-lane bus to the chipset (PCH).
- L1 cache:
  - P-cores: 80 KB (48 KB data + 32 KB instructions) per core.
  - E-cores: 96 KB (64 KB data + 32 KB instructions) per core.
- L2 cache:
  - P-cores: 1.25 MB per core.
  - E-cores: 2 MB per E-core cluster (each "cluster" contains four cores).
- Fabrication process: Intel 7.
- The i3-1315U is available with IPU (image processing unit). Specifications between it and the respective processor without IPU are completely identical, apart from the addition of the IPU.

Processor branding	Model	P-core (performance)			E-core (efficiency)			Integrated GPU		Smart Cache	TDP		Release date
Processor branding	Model	Cores (Threads)	Clock rate (GHz)		Cores (Threads)	Clock rate (GHz)		Model	Clock (MHz)	Smart Cache	Base	Max. Turbo	Release date
Processor branding	Model	Cores (Threads)	Base	Turbo	Cores (Threads)	Base	Turbo	Model	Clock (MHz)	Smart Cache	Base	Max. Turbo	Release date
Core i7	1365U	2 (4)	1.8	5.2	8 (8)	1.3	3.9	Iris Xe (96 EU)	?–1300	12 MB	15 W	55 W	January 2023
Core i7	1355U	2 (4)	1.7	5.0	8 (8)	1.2	3.7	Iris Xe (96 EU)	?–1300	12 MB	15 W	55 W	January 2023
Core i5	1345U	2 (4)	1.6	4.7	8 (8)	1.2	3.5	Iris Xe (80 EU)	?–1250	12 MB	15 W	55 W	January 2023
Core i5	1335U	2 (4)	1.3	4.6	8 (8)	0.9	3.4	Iris Xe (80 EU)	?–1250	12 MB	15 W	55 W	January 2023
Core i5	1334U	2 (4)	1.3	4.6	8 (8)	0.9	3.4	Iris Xe (80 EU)	?–1250	12 MB	15 W	55 W	January 2023
Core i3	1315U	2 (4)	1.2	4.5	4 (4)	0.9	3.3	UHD Graphics (64 EU)	?–1250	10 MB	15 W	55 W	January 2023
Core i3	1305U	1 (2)	1.6	4.5	4 (4)	1.2	3.3	UHD Graphics (64 EU)	?–1250	10 MB	15 W	55 W	January 2023

=== Raptor Lake-P ===
Common features:

- Socket: BGA 1744.
- All the CPUs support dual-channel DDR5-5200, DDR4-3200, LPDDR5-6400 or LPDDR4X-4266 RAM.
- All CPU models provide 8 lanes of PCIe 4.0 and 12 lanes of PCIe 3.0.
- All CPUs feature a DMI 4.0 8-lane bus to the chipset (PCH).
- L1 cache:
  - P-cores: 80 KB (48 KB data + 32 KB instructions) per core.
  - E-cores: 96 KB (32 KB data + 64 KB instructions) per core.
- L2 cache:
  - P-cores: (up to) 2 MB per core.
  - E-cores: (up to) 4 MB per E-core cluster (each "cluster" contains four cores).
- Fabrication process: Intel 7.

Processor branding	Model	P-core (performance)			E-core (efficiency)			Integrated GPU		Smart Cache	TDP		Release date
Processor branding	Model	Cores (Threads)	Clock rate (GHz)		Cores (Threads)	Clock rate (GHz)		Model	Clock (MHz)	Smart Cache	Base	Max. Turbo	Release date
Processor branding	Model	Cores (Threads)	Base	Turbo	Cores (Threads)	Base	Turbo	Model	Clock (MHz)	Smart Cache	Base	Max. Turbo	Release date
Core i7	1370P	6 (12)	1.9	5.2	8 (8)	1.4	3.9	Iris Xe (96 EU)	?–1500	24 MB	28 W	64 W	January 2023
Core i7	1360P	4 (8)	2.2	5.0	8 (8)	1.6	3.7	Iris Xe (96 EU)	?–1500	18 MB	28 W	64 W	January 2023
Core i5	1350P	4 (8)	1.9	4.7	8 (8)	1.4	3.5	Iris Xe (80 EU)	?–1500	12 MB	28 W	64 W	January 2023
Core i5	1340P	4 (8)	1.9	4.6	8 (8)	1.4	3.4	Iris Xe (80 EU)	?–1450	12 MB	28 W	64 W	January 2023

=== Raptor Lake-H ===
Common features:

- Socket: BGA 1744.
- All the CPUs support dual-channel DDR5-5200, DDR4-3200, LPDDR5-6400 or LPDDR4X-4266 RAM.
- All CPU models provide 8 lanes of PCIe 5.0 and 8 lanes of PCIe 4.0, in addition to 12 lanes of PCIe 3.0 provided by the on-package PCH.
- All CPUs feature a DMI 4.0 8-lane bus to the chipset (PCH).
- L1 cache:
  - P-cores: 80 KB (48 KB data + 32 KB instructions) per core.
  - E-cores: 96 KB (64 KB data + 32 KB instructions) per core.
- L2 cache:
  - P-cores: 2 MB per core.
  - E-cores: 4 MB per E-core cluster (each "cluster" contains four cores).
- Fabrication process: Intel 7.
- K-suffix processors have an unlocked multiplier, allowing it to be overclocked.
- The i5-13500H is available with IPU (image processing unit). Specifications between it and the respective processor without IPU are completely identical, apart from the addition of the IPU.

Processor branding	Model	P-core (performance)			E-core (efficiency)			Integrated GPU		Smart Cache	TDP		Release date
Processor branding	Model	Cores (Threads)	Clock rate (GHz)		Cores (Threads)	Clock rate (GHz)		Model	Clock (MHz)	Smart Cache	Base	Max. Turbo	Release date
Processor branding	Model	Cores (Threads)	Base	Turbo	Cores (Threads)	Base	Turbo	Model	Clock (MHz)	Smart Cache	Base	Max. Turbo	Release date
Core i9	13900HK	6 (12)	2.6	5.4	8 (8)	1.9	4.1	Iris Xe (96 EU)	?–1500	24 MB	45 W	115 W	January 2023
Core i9	13900H	6 (12)	2.6	5.4	8 (8)	1.9	4.1	Iris Xe (96 EU)	?–1500	24 MB	45 W	115 W	January 2023
Core i7	13800H	6 (12)	2.5	5.2	8 (8)	1.8	4.0	Iris Xe (96 EU)	?–1500	24 MB	45 W	115 W	January 2023
Core i7	13700H	6 (12)	2.4	5.0	8 (8)	1.8	3.7	Iris Xe (96 EU)	?–1500	24 MB	45 W	115 W	January 2023
Core i7	13620H	6 (12)	2.4	4.9	4 (4)	1.8	3.6	UHD Graphics (64 EU)	?–1500	24 MB	45 W	115 W	January 2023
Core i5	13600H	4 (8)	2.8	4.8	8 (8)	2.1	3.6	Iris Xe (80 EU)	?–1500	18 MB	45 W	95 W	January 2023
Core i5	13500H	4 (8)	2.6	4.7	8 (8)	1.9	3.5	Iris Xe (80 EU)	?–1450	18 MB	45 W	95 W	January 2023
Core i5	13420H	4 (8)	2.1	4.6	4 (4)	1.5	3.4	UHD Graphics (48 EU)	?–1400	12 MB	45 W	95 W	January 2023

=== Raptor Lake-PX ===
Common features:

- Socket: BGA 1792.
- All the CPUs support dual-channel DDR5-5200, DDR4-3200, LPDDR5-6400 or LPDDR4X-4266 RAM.
- All CPU models provide 8 lanes of PCIe 5.0 and 8 lanes of PCIe 4.0, in addition to 12 lanes of PCIe 3.0 provided by the on-package PCH.
- All CPUs feature a DMI 4.0 8-lane bus to the chipset (PCH).
- L1 cache:
  - P-cores: 80 KB (48 KB data + 32 KB instructions) per core.
  - E-cores: 96 KB (64 KB data + 32 KB instructions) per core.
- L2 cache:
  - P-cores: 2 MB per core.
  - E-cores: 4 MB per E-core cluster (each "cluster" contains four cores).
- Fabrication process: Intel 7.

Processor branding	Model	P-core (performance)			E-core (efficiency)			Integrated GPU		Smart Cache	TDP		Release date
Processor branding	Model	Cores (Threads)	Clock rate (GHz)		Cores (Threads)	Clock rate (GHz)		Model	Clock (MHz)	Smart Cache	Base	Max. Turbo	Release date
Processor branding	Model	Cores (Threads)	Base	Turbo	Cores (Threads)	Base	Turbo	Model	Clock (MHz)	Smart Cache	Base	Max. Turbo	Release date
Core i9	13905H	6 (12)	2.6	5.4	8 (8)	1.9	4.1	Iris Xe (96 EU)	?–1500	24 MB	45 W	115 W	January 2023
Core i7	13705H	6 (12)	2.4	5.0	8 (8)	1.8	3.7	Iris Xe (96 EU)	?–1500	24 MB	45 W	115 W	January 2023
Core i5	13505H	4 (8)	2.6	4.7	8 (8)	1.9	3.5	Iris Xe (80 EU)	?–1450	18 MB	45 W	115 W	January 2023

=== Raptor Lake-HX ===
Common features:

- Socket: BGA 1964.
- All the CPUs support dual-channel DDR5-4800 or DDR4-3200 RAM. Models i7-13645HX, i7-13850HX and up support DDR5 at up to 5600 MT/s speed.
- All CPU models provide 16 lanes of PCIe 5.0 and 4 lanes of PCIe 4.0, in addition to 16 lanes of PCIe 4.0 and 12 lanes of PCIe 3.0 provided by the on-package PCH.
- All CPUs feature a DMI 4.0 8-lane bus to the on-package chipset (PCH).
- L1 cache:
  - P-cores: 80 KB (48 KB data + 32 KB instructions) per core.
  - E-cores: 96 KB (64 KB data + 32 KB instructions) per core.
- L2 cache:
  - P-cores: 2 MB per core.
  - E-cores: 4 MB per E-core cluster (each "cluster" contains four cores).
- Fabrication process: Intel 7.
- All models support CPU, iGPU, and memory overclocking.
- i9-13980HX features Thermal Velocity Boost. Without it enabled, the maximum boost clock speed is 0.1 GHz lower.

Processor branding	Model	P-core (performance)			E-core (efficiency)			Integrated GPU		Smart Cache	TDP		Release date
Processor branding	Model	Cores (Threads)	Clock rate (GHz)		Cores (Threads)	Clock rate (GHz)		Model	Clock (MHz)	Smart Cache	Base	Max. Turbo	Release date
Processor branding	Model	Cores (Threads)	Base	Turbo	Cores (Threads)	Base	Turbo	Model	Clock (MHz)	Smart Cache	Base	Max. Turbo	Release date
Core i9	13980HX	8 (16)	2.2	5.6	16 (16)	1.6	4.0	UHD Graphics (32 EU)	?–1650	36 MB	55 W	157 W	January 2023
Core i9	13950HX	8 (16)	2.2	5.5	16 (16)	1.6	4.0	UHD Graphics (32 EU)	?–1650	36 MB	55 W	157 W	January 2023
Core i9	13900HX	8 (16)	2.2	5.4	16 (16)	1.6	3.9	UHD Graphics (32 EU)	?–1650	36 MB	55 W	157 W	January 2023
Core i7	13850HX	8 (16)	2.1	5.1	12 (12)	1.5	3.8	UHD Graphics (32 EU)	?–1600	30 MB	55 W	157 W	January 2023
Core i7	13700HX	8 (16)	2.1	5.0	8 (8)	1.5	3.6	UHD Graphics (32 EU)	?–1550	30 MB	55 W	157 W	January 2023
Core i7	13650HX	6 (12)	2.6	4.9	8 (8)	1.9	3.6	UHD Graphics (16 EU)	?–1550	24 MB	55 W	157 W	January 2023
Core i7	13645HX	6 (12)	2.6	4.9	8 (8)	1.9	3.5	UHD Graphics (32 EU)	?–1550	24 MB	55 W	157 W	March 2026
Core i5	13600HX	6 (12)	2.6	4.7	8 (8)	1.9	3.6	UHD Graphics (32 EU)	?–1500	24 MB	55 W	157 W	January 2023
Core i5	13500HX	6 (12)	2.5	4.6	8 (8)	1.8	3.5	UHD Graphics (32 EU)	?–1500	24 MB	55 W	157 W	January 2023
Core i5	13450HX	6 (12)	2.4	4.6	4 (4)	1.8	3.4	UHD Graphics (16 EU)	?–1450	20 MB	55 W	157 W	January 2023

== Core i (14th gen) ==
=== Raptor Lake-HX Refresh ===
Common features:

- Socket: BGA 1964.
- All the CPUs support dual-channel DDR5-5600 or DDR4-3200 RAM.
- All CPU models provide 16 lanes of PCIe 5.0 and 4 lanes of PCIe 4.0, in addition to 16 lanes of PCIe 4.0 and 12 lanes of PCIe 3.0 provided by the on-package PCH.
- All CPUs feature a DMI 4.0 8-lane bus to the chipset (PCH).
- L1 cache:
  - P-cores: 80 KB (48 KB data + 32 KB instructions) per core.
  - E-cores: 96 KB (64 KB data + 32 KB instructions) per core.
- L2 cache:
  - P-cores: 2 MB per core.
  - E-cores: 4 MB per E-core cluster (each "cluster" contains four cores).
- Fabrication process: Intel 7.
- All models support CPU, iGPU, and memory overclocking.
- i7-14650HX, i7-14700HX, and i9-14900HX feature Thermal Velocity Boost. Without it enabled, the maximum boost clock speed is 0.1 GHz lower.
- i7-14700HX, and i9-14900HX feature Intel Application Optimization.

Processor branding	Model	P-core (performance)			E-core (efficiency)			Integrated GPU		Smart Cache	TDP		Release date
Processor branding	Model	Cores (Threads)	Clock rate (GHz)		Cores (Threads)	Clock rate (GHz)		Model	Clock (MHz)	Smart Cache	Base	Max. Turbo	Release date
Processor branding	Model	Cores (Threads)	Base	Turbo	Cores (Threads)	Base	Turbo	Model	Clock (MHz)	Smart Cache	Base	Max. Turbo	Release date
Core i9	14900HX	8 (16)	2.2	5.8	16 (16)	1.6	4.1	UHD Graphics (32 EU)	?–1650	36 MB	55 W	157 W	January 2024
Core i7	14700HX	8 (16)	2.1	5.5	12 (12)	1.5	3.9	UHD Graphics (32 EU)	?–1600	33 MB	55 W	157 W	January 2024
Core i7	14650HX	8 (16)	2.2	5.2	8 (8)	1.6	3.7	UHD Graphics (16 EU)	?–1600	30 MB	55 W	157 W	January 2024
Core i5	14500HX	6 (12)	2.6	4.9	8 (8)	1.9	3.5	UHD Graphics (32 EU)	?–1550	24 MB	55 W	157 W	January 2024
Core i5	14450HX	6 (12)	2.4	4.8	4 (4)	1.8	3.5	UHD Graphics (16 EU)	?–1500	20 MB	55 W	157 W	January 2024

== Core / Core Ultra 3/5/7/9 (Series 1) ==
=== Raptor Lake-U Refresh ===
Common features:

- Socket: BGA 1744.
- All the CPUs support dual-channel DDR5-5200, DDR4-3200, LPDDR5-6400 or LPDDR4X-4266 RAM.
- All CPU models provide 8 lanes of PCIe 4.0 and 12 lanes of PCIe 3.0.
- All CPUs feature a DMI 4.0 8-lane bus to the chipset (PCH).
- Includes integrated graphics based on Xe-LP architecture.
- L1 cache:
  - P-cores: 80 KB (48 KB data + 32 KB instructions) per core.
  - E-cores: 96 KB (64 KB data + 32 KB instructions) per core.
- L2 cache:
  - P-cores: 2 MB per core.
  - E-cores: 4 MB per E-core cluster (each "cluster" contains four cores).
- Fabrication process: Intel 7.
- The Core 3 100U is available with IPU (image processing unit). Specifications between it and the respective processor without IPU are completely identical, apart from the addition of the IPU.

Processor branding	Model	P-core (performance)			E-core (efficiency)			Integrated GPU		Smart Cache	TDP		Release date
Processor branding	Model	Cores (Threads)	Clock rate (GHz)		Cores (Threads)	Clock rate (GHz)		Model	Clock (MHz)	Smart Cache	Base	Max. Turbo	Release date
Processor branding	Model	Cores (Threads)	Base	Turbo	Cores (Threads)	Base	Turbo	Model	Clock (MHz)	Smart Cache	Base	Max. Turbo	Release date
Core 7	150U	2 (4)	1.8	5.4	8 (8)	1.2	4.0	Intel Graphics (96 EU)	?–1300	12 MB	15 W	55 W	January 2024
Core 5	120U	2 (4)	1.4	5.0	8 (8)	0.9	3.8	Intel Graphics (80 EU)	?–1250	12 MB	15 W	55 W	January 2024
Core 3	100U	2 (4)	1.2	4.7	4 (4)	0.9	3.3	Intel Graphics (64 EU)	?–1250	10 MB	15 W	55 W	January 2024

=== Meteor Lake-U ===
Common features:

- Socket: BGA 2049.
- All the CPUs except 1x4U models support dual-channel DDR5-5600 or LPDDR5X-7466 RAM. 1x4U models support dual-channel LPDDR5(X)-6400.
- All CPUs feature a DMI 4.0 8-lane bus to the chipset (PCH).
- Includes integrated graphics based on Alchemist architecture.
- L1 cache:
  - P-cores: 112 KB (48 KB data + 64 KB instructions) per core.
  - E-cores: 96 KB (64 KB data + 32 KB instructions) per core.
- L2 cache:
  - P-cores: 2 MB per core.
  - E-cores: 2 MB per E-core cluster (each "cluster" contains four cores).
- All processor models also feature 2× "LP E-Cores" which are clocked at 0.7 GHz base (0.4 GHz on 1x4U models), 2.1 GHz boost and have 2 MB of L2 cache.
- Fabrication process: Intel 4 (compute tile).
- Configurable TDP (cTDP) of 12–28 W is featured on 1x5U models, and 9–15 W on 1x4U models.

Processor branding	Model	P-core (performance)			E-core (efficiency)			Integrated GPU		Smart Cache	TDP		Release date
Processor branding	Model	Cores (Threads)	Clock rate (GHz)		Cores (Threads)	Clock rate (GHz)		Model	Clock (MHz)	Smart Cache	Base	Max. Turbo	Release date
Processor branding	Model	Cores (Threads)	Base	Turbo	Cores (Threads)	Base	Turbo	Model	Clock (MHz)	Smart Cache	Base	Max. Turbo	Release date
Core Ultra 7	165U	2 (4)	1.7	4.9	8 (8)	1.2	3.8	Intel Graphics (4 Xe-cores)	?–2000	12 MB	15 W	57 W	December 2023
Core Ultra 7	164U	2 (4)	1.1	4.8	8 (8)	0.7	3.8	Intel Graphics (4 Xe-cores)	?–1800	12 MB	9 W	30 W	December 2023
Core Ultra 7	155U	2 (4)	1.7	4.8	8 (8)	1.2	3.8	Intel Graphics (4 Xe-cores)	?–1950	12 MB	15 W	57 W	December 2023
Core Ultra 5	135U	2 (4)	1.6	4.4	8 (8)	1.1	3.6	Intel Graphics (4 Xe-cores)	?–1900	12 MB	15 W	57 W	December 2023
Core Ultra 5	134U	2 (4)	0.7	4.4	8 (8)	0.5	3.6	Intel Graphics (4 Xe-cores)	?–1750	12 MB	9 W	30 W	December 2023
Core Ultra 5	125U	2 (4)	1.3	4.3	8 (8)	0.8	3.6	Intel Graphics (4 Xe-cores)	?–1850	12 MB	15 W	57 W	December 2023
Core Ultra 5	115U	2 (4)	1.5	4.2	4 (4)	1.0	3.5	Intel Graphics (3 Xe-cores)	?–1800	10 MB	15 W	57 W	December 2023

=== Meteor Lake-H ===
Common features:

- Socket: BGA 2049.
- All the CPUs support dual-channel DDR5-5600 or LPDDR5X-7466 RAM.
- All CPU models provide 8 lanes of PCIe 5.0 and 20 lanes of PCIe 4.0.
- Includes integrated graphics based on Alchemist architecture.
- L1 cache:
  - P-cores: 112 KB (48 KB data + 64 KB instructions) per core.
  - E-cores: 96 KB (64 KB data + 32 KB instructions) per core.
- L2 cache:
  - P-cores: 2 MB per core.
  - E-cores: 2 MB per E-core cluster (each "cluster" contains four cores).
- All processor models also feature 2× "LP E-Cores" which are clocked at 0.7 GHz base (1.0 GHz on Core Ultra 9 185H), 2.5 GHz boost and have 2 MB of L2 cache.
- Fabrication process: Intel 4 (compute tile).
- Configurable TDP (cTDP) of 35–65 W is featured on Core Ultra 9 185H, and 20–65 W on all other models.

Processor branding	Model	P-core (performance)			E-core (efficiency)			Integrated GPU		Smart Cache	TDP		Release date
Processor branding	Model	Cores (Threads)	Clock rate (GHz)		Cores (Threads)	Clock rate (GHz)		Model	Clock (MHz)	Smart Cache	Base	Max. Turbo	Release date
Processor branding	Model	Cores (Threads)	Base	Turbo	Cores (Threads)	Base	Turbo	Model	Clock (MHz)	Smart Cache	Base	Max. Turbo	Release date
Core Ultra 9	185H	6 (12)	2.3	5.1	8 (8)	1.8	3.8	Intel Arc (8 Xe-cores)	?–2350	24 MB	45 W	115 W	December 2023
Core Ultra 7	165H	6 (12)	1.4	5.0	8 (8)	0.9	3.8	Intel Arc (8 Xe-cores)	?–2300	24 MB	28 W	115 W	December 2023
Core Ultra 7	155H	6 (12)	1.4	4.8	8 (8)	0.9	3.8	Intel Arc (8 Xe-cores)	?–2250	24 MB	28 W	115 W	December 2023
Core Ultra 5	135H	4 (8)	1.7	4.6	8 (8)	1.2	3.6	Intel Arc (8 Xe-cores)	?–2200	18 MB	28 W	115 W	December 2023
Core Ultra 5	125H	4 (8)	1.2	4.5	8 (8)	0.7	3.6	Intel Arc (7 Xe-cores)	?–2200	18 MB	28 W	115 W	December 2023

== Core / Core Ultra 5/7/9 (Series 2) ==
=== Raptor Lake-U Refresh ===
Common features:

- Socket: BGA 1744.
- All CPUs support dual-channel DDR4-3200, LPDDR4X-4266, DDR5-5200, and LPDDR5(X)-6400 RAM.

Processor branding	Model	P-core (performance)			E-core (efficiency)			Integrated GPU		Smart Cache	TDP		Release date
Processor branding	Model	Cores (Threads)	Clock rate (GHz)		Cores (Threads)	Clock rate (GHz)		Model	Clock (MHz)	Smart Cache	Base	Max. Turbo	Release date
Processor branding	Model	Cores (Threads)	Base	Turbo	Cores (Threads)	Base	Turbo	Model	Clock (MHz)	Smart Cache	Base	Max. Turbo	Release date
Core 7	250U	2 (4)	1.8	5.4	8 (8)	1.2	4.0	Intel Graphics (96 EU)	?–1300	12 MB	15 W	55 W	January 2025
Core 5	220U	2 (4)	1.4	5.0	8 (8)	0.9	3.8	Intel Graphics (80 EU)	?–1300	12 MB	15 W	55 W	January 2025

=== Arrow Lake-U ===
Common features:

- Socket: BGA 2049.
- All CPUs support DDR5-6400 and LPDDR5X-8400 RAM.

Processor branding	Model	P-core (performance)			E-core (efficiency)			Integrated GPU		Smart Cache	TDP		Release date
Processor branding	Model	Cores (Threads)	Clock rate (GHz)		Cores (Threads)	Clock rate (GHz)		Model	Clock (MHz)	Smart Cache	Base	Max. Turbo	Release date
Processor branding	Model	Cores (Threads)	Base	Turbo	Cores (Threads)	Base	Turbo	Model	Clock (MHz)	Smart Cache	Base	Max. Turbo	Release date
Core Ultra 7	265U	2 (4)	2.1	5.3	8 (8)	1.7	4.2	Intel Graphics (4 Xe-cores)	?–2100	12 MB	15 W	57 W	January 2025
Core Ultra 7	255U	2 (4)	2.0	5.2	8 (8)	1.7	4.2	Intel Graphics (4 Xe-cores)	?–2100	12 MB	15 W	57 W	January 2025
Core Ultra 5	235U	2 (4)	2.0	4.9	8 (8)	1.6	4.1	Intel Graphics (4 Xe-cores)	?–2050	12 MB	15 W	57 W	January 2025
Core Ultra 5	225U	2 (4)	1.5	4.8	8 (8)	1.3	3.8	Intel Graphics (4 Xe-cores)	?–2000	12 MB	15 W	57 W	January 2025

=== Lunar Lake ===
Common features:

- Socket: BGA 2833.
- All the CPUs support dual-channel LPDDR5X-8533 RAM (on package).
- All CPU models provide 4 lanes of PCIe 5.0.
- L1 cache:
  - P-cores: 112 KB (48 KB (12-Way) data + 64 KB (16-Way) instructions) per core.
  - E-cores: 96 KB (32 KB (8-Way) data + 64 KB (16-Way) instructions) per core.
- L2 cache:
  - P-cores: 2.5 MB (10-Way) per core.
  - E-cores: 4 MB (16-Way) per E-core cluster (each "cluster" contains four cores).
- Fabrication process: Compute Tile (Contains the CPU cores) TSMC's N3B node.

Processor branding	Model	P-core (performance)			E-core (efficiency)			Integrated GPU		Smart Cache	NPU		Integrated memory		TDP		Release date
Processor branding	Model	Cores (Threads)	Clock rate (GHz)		Cores (Threads)	Clock rate (GHz)		Model	Clock (MHz)	Smart Cache	Neural computes engines	NPU AI TOPS	Memory speed	Memory capacity	Base	Max. Turbo	Release date
Processor branding	Model	Cores (Threads)	Base	Turbo	Cores (Threads)	Base	Turbo	Model	Clock (MHz)	Smart Cache	Neural computes engines	NPU AI TOPS	Memory speed	Memory capacity	Base	Max. Turbo	Release date
Core Ultra 9	288V	4 (4)	3.3	5.1	4 (4)	3.3	3.7	Intel Arc 140V (8 Xe-cores)	?–2050	12 MB	6x Gen4	48	LPDDR5X; 8533 MT/s	32 GB	30 W (Min:17 W)	37 W	September 2024
Core Ultra 7	268V	4 (4)	2.2	5.0	4 (4)	2.2	3.7	Intel Arc 140V (8 Xe-cores)	?–2000	12 MB	6x Gen4	48	LPDDR5X; 8533 MT/s	32 GB	17 W (Min:8 W)	37 W	September 2024
Core Ultra 7	266V	4 (4)	2.2	5.0	4 (4)	2.2	3.7	Intel Arc 140V (8 Xe-cores)	?–2000	12 MB	6x Gen4	48	LPDDR5X; 8533 MT/s	16 GB	17 W (Min:8 W)	37 W	September 2024
Core Ultra 7	258V	4 (4)	2.2	4.8	4 (4)	2.2	3.7	Intel Arc 140V (8 Xe-cores)	?–1950	12 MB	6x Gen4	47	LPDDR5X; 8533 MT/s	32 GB	17 W (Min:8 W)	37 W	September 2024
Core Ultra 7	256V	4 (4)	2.2	4.8	4 (4)	2.2	3.7	Intel Arc 140V (8 Xe-cores)	?–1950	12 MB	6x Gen4	47	LPDDR5X; 8533 MT/s	16 GB	17 W (Min:8 W)	37 W	September 2024
Core Ultra 5	238V	4 (4)	2.1	4.7	4 (4)	2.1	3.5	Intel Arc 130V (7 Xe-cores)	?–1850	8 MB	5x Gen4	40	LPDDR5X; 8533 MT/s	32 GB	17 W (Min:8 W)	37 W	September 2024
Core Ultra 5	236V	4 (4)	2.1	4.7	4 (4)	2.1	3.5	Intel Arc 130V (7 Xe-cores)	?–1850	8 MB	5x Gen4	40	LPDDR5X; 8533 MT/s	16 GB	17 W (Min:8 W)	37 W	September 2024
Core Ultra 5	228V	4 (4)	2.1	4.5	4 (4)	2.1	3.5	Intel Arc 130V (7 Xe-cores)	?–1850	8 MB	5x Gen4	40	LPDDR5X; 8533 MT/s	32 GB	17 W (Min:8 W)	37 W	September 2024
Core Ultra 5	226V	4 (4)	2.1	4.5	4 (4)	2.1	3.5	Intel Arc 130V (7 Xe-cores)	?–1850	8 MB	5x Gen4	40	LPDDR5X; 8533 MT/s	16 GB	17 W (Min:8 W)	37 W	September 2024

=== Raptor Lake-H Refresh ===
Common features:

- Socket: BGA 1744.
- All CPUs support DDR4-3200, LPDDR4X-4266, DDR5-5200, or LPDDR5(X)-5200 RAM.

Processor branding	Model	P-core (performance)			E-core (efficiency)			Integrated GPU		Smart Cache	TDP		Release date
Processor branding	Model	Cores (Threads)	Clock rate (GHz)		Cores (Threads)	Clock rate (GHz)		Model	Clock (MHz)	Smart Cache	Base	Max. Turbo	Release date
Processor branding	Model	Cores (Threads)	Base	Turbo	Cores (Threads)	Base	Turbo	Model	Clock (MHz)	Smart Cache	Base	Max. Turbo	Release date
Core 9	270H	6 (12)	2.7	5.8	8 (8)	2.0	4.1	Iris Xe (96 EU)	?–1550	24 MB	45 W	115 W	December 2024
Core 7	250H	6 (12)	2.5	5.4	8 (8)	1.8	4.0	Iris Xe (96 EU)	?–1550	24 MB	45 W	115 W	December 2024
Core 7	240H	6 (12)	2.5	5.2	4 (4)	1.8	4.0	UHD Graphics (64 EU)	?–1550	24 MB	45 W	115 W	December 2024
Core 7	230H	6 (12)	2.5	5.2	4 (4)	1.8	4.0	—N/a		24 MB	45 W	115 W	June 2026
Core 5	220H	4 (8)	2.7	4.9	8 (8)	2.0	3.7	Iris Xe (80 EU)	?–1500	18 MB	45 W	115 W	December 2024
Core 5	210H	4 (8)	2.2	4.8	4 (4)	1.6	3.6	UHD Graphics (48 EU)	?–1400	12 MB	45 W	115 W	December 2024
Core 5	205H	4 (8)	2.2	4.8	4 (4)	1.6	3.6	—N/a		12 MB	45 W	115 W	June 2026

=== Arrow Lake-H ===
Common features:

- Socket: BGA 2049.
- All CPUs support dual-channel DDR5-6400 and LPDDR5(X)-8400 RAM.

Processor branding	Model	P-core (performance)			E-core (efficiency)			Integrated GPU		Smart Cache	NPU (TOPS)	TDP		Release date
Processor branding	Model	Cores (Threads)	Clock rate (GHz)		Cores (Threads)	Clock rate (GHz)		Model	Clock (MHz)	Smart Cache	NPU (TOPS)	Base	Max. Turbo	Release date
Processor branding	Model	Cores (Threads)	Base	Turbo	Cores (Threads)	Base	Turbo	Model	Clock (MHz)	Smart Cache	NPU (TOPS)	Base	Max. Turbo	Release date
Core Ultra 9	285H	6 (6)	2.9	5.4	8 (8)	2.7	4.5	Intel Arc 140T (8 Xe-cores)	?–2350	24 MB	13	45 W	115 W	January 2025
Core Ultra 7	265H	6 (6)	2.2	5.3	8 (8)	1.7	4.5	Intel Arc 140T (8 Xe-cores)	?–2300	24 MB	13	28 W	115 W	January 2025
Core Ultra 7	255H	6 (6)	2.0	5.1	8 (8)	1.5	4.4	Intel Arc 140T (8 Xe-cores)	?–2250	24 MB	13	28 W	115 W	January 2025
Core Ultra 5	235H	4 (4)	2.4	5.0	8 (8)	1.8	4.4	Intel Arc 140T (8 Xe-cores)	?–2250	18 MB	13	28 W	115 W	January 2025
Core Ultra 5	225H	4 (4)	1.7	4.9	8 (8)	1.3	4.3	Intel Arc 130T (7 Xe-cores)	?–2200	18 MB	13	28 W	115 W	January 2025

=== Arrow Lake-HX ===
Common features:

- Socket: BGA 2114.
- All CPUs support dual-channel DDR5-6400 RAM and Core Ultra 290HX Plus, 270HX Plus also support DDR5-7200 RAM.
  - Core Ultra 245HX, 265HX, and 285HX support ECC memory.
- Core Ultra 9 285HX supports Intel vPro and related technologies.

Processor branding	Model	P-core (performance)			E-core (efficiency)			Integrated GPU		Smart Cache	NPU (TOPS)	TDP		Release date
Processor branding	Model	Cores (Threads)	Clock rate (GHz)		Cores (Threads)	Clock rate (GHz)		Model	Clock (MHz)	Smart Cache	NPU (TOPS)	Base	Max. Turbo	Release date
Processor branding	Model	Cores (Threads)	Base	Turbo	Cores (Threads)	Base	Turbo	Model	Clock (MHz)	Smart Cache	NPU (TOPS)	Base	Max. Turbo	Release date
Core Ultra 9	290HX Plus	8 (8)	2.7	5.5	16 (16)	1.8	4.7	Intel Arc (4 Xe-cores)	300–2000	36 MB	13	55 W	160 W	March 2026
Core Ultra 9	285HX	8 (8)	2.8	5.5	16 (16)	2.1	4.6	Intel Arc (4 Xe-cores)	300–2000	36 MB	13	55 W	160 W	January 2025
Core Ultra 9	275HX	8 (8)	2.7	5.4	16 (16)	2.1	4.6	Intel Arc (4 Xe-cores)	300–1900	36 MB	13	55 W	160 W	January 2025
Core Ultra 7	270HX Plus	8 (8)	2.4	5.3	12(12)	1.8	4.7	Intel Arc (4 Xe-cores)	300–1900	30 MB	13	55 W	160 W	March 2026
Core Ultra 7	265HX	8 (8)	2.6	5.3	12(12)	2.3	4.6	Intel Arc (4 Xe-cores)	300–1900	30 MB	13	55 W	160 W	January 2025
Core Ultra 7	255HX	8 (8)	2.4	5.2	12(12)	1.8	4.5	Intel Arc (4 Xe-cores)	300–1850	30 MB	13	55 W	160 W	January 2025
Core Ultra 5	245HX	6 (6)	3.1	5.1	8 (8)	2.6	4.5	Intel Arc (3 Xe-cores)	300–1900	24 MB	13	55 W	160 W	January 2025
Core Ultra 5	235HX	6 (6)	2.9	5.1	8 (8)	2.6	4.5	Intel Arc (3 Xe-cores)	300–1900	24 MB	13	55 W	160 W	January 2025

=== Twin Lake-N ===
Common features:

- Socket: BGA 1264.
- All CPUs support single channel DDR4-3200, DDR5-4800, or LPDDR5-4800 MT/s RAM.
- All CPUs are manufactured on Intel 7 (Previously Intel 10nm)

Processor branding	Model	Cores (Threads)	Clock rate (GHz)		Integrated GPU		Smart Cache	TDP		Release date
Processor branding	Model	Cores (Threads)	Base	Turbo	Model	Clock (MHz)	Smart Cache	Base	Max. Turbo	Release date
Core 3	N355	8 (8)	1.8	3.9	UHD Graphics (32 EU)	1350	6 MB	15 W	35 W	Q1'25
Core 3	N350	8 (8)	0.8	3.9	UHD Graphics (32 EU)	1350	6 MB	7 W	25 W	Q1'25
Intel	N250	4(4)		3.8	UHD Graphics (32 EU)	1250	6 MB	6 W		Q1'25
Intel	N150	4(4)		3.6	24 EU	1000	6 MB	6 W		Q1'25

== Core / Core Ultra 5/7/9 (Series 3) ==
=== Panther Lake ===
Common features:

- Socket: BGA 2540.
- All CPUs support dual-channel memory.
- Fabrication process:
  - 8 Core + 4 Xe GPU: Compute Tile (Contains the CPU cores) Intel's 18A process node, GPU tile "Intel 3" process node.
  - 16 Core + 4 Xe GPU: Compute Tile (Contains the CPU cores) Intel's 18A process node, GPU tile "Intel 3" process node.
  - 16 Core + 12 Xe GPU: Compute Tile (Contains the CPU cores) Intel's 18A process node, GPU tile TSMC's N3E process node.

Processor branding	Model	P-core (performance)			E-core (efficiency)			LPE-core (efficiency)			Integrated GPU		Smart Cache	NPU AI TOPS	Memory		TDP		Release date
Processor branding	Model	Cores (Threads)	Clock rate (GHz)		Cores (Threads)	Clock rate (GHz)		Cores (Threads)	Clock rate (GHz)		Model	Clock (MHz)	Smart Cache	NPU AI TOPS	Max. speed	Max. capacity	Base	Max. Turbo	Release date
Processor branding	Model	Cores (Threads)	Base	Turbo	Cores (Threads)	Base	Turbo	Cores (Threads)	Base	Turbo	Model	Clock (MHz)	Smart Cache	NPU AI TOPS	Max. speed	Max. capacity	Base	Max. Turbo	Release date
Core Ultra X9	388H	4 (4)	2.1	5.1	8 (8)	1.6	4.0	4 (4)	1.6	3.7	Intel Arc B390 (12 Xe-cores)	?–2500	18 MB	50	LPDDR5X 9600 MT/s	96 GB	25 W (Min:15 W)	80 W	January 2026
Core Ultra 9	386H	4 (4)	2.1	4.9	8 (8)	1.6	3.9	4 (4)	1.6	3.5	Intel Graphics (4 Xe-cores)	?–2500	18 MB	50	LPDDR5X-8533 MT/s; DDR5-7200 MT/s	96 GB; 128 GB	25 W (Min:15 W)	80 W	January 2026
Core Ultra X9	378H	4 (4)	2.0	5.0	8 (8)	1.6	3.8	4 (4)	1.6	3.6	Intel Arc B390 (12 Xe-cores)	?–2500	18 MB	50	LPDDR5X 9600 MT/s	96 GB	25 W (Min:15 W)	80 W	April 2026
Core Ultra X7	368H	4 (4)	2.0	5.0	8 (8)	1.6	4.0	4 (4)	1.6	3.6	Intel Arc B390 (12 Xe-cores)	?–2500	18 MB	50	LPDDR5X 9600 MT/s	96 GB	25 W (Min:15 W)	80 W	January 2026
Core Ultra 7	366H	4 (4)	2.0	4.8	8 (8)	1.6	3.8	4 (4)	1.6	3.4	Intel Graphics (4 Xe-cores)	?–2500	18 MB	50	LPDDR5X-8533 MT/s; DDR5-7200 MT/s	96 GB; 128 GB	25 W (Min:15 W)	80 W	January 2026
Core Ultra 7	365	4 (4)	2.4	4.8	—N/a			4 (4)	1.8	3.6	Intel Graphics (4 Xe-cores)	?–2500	12 MB	49	LPDDR5X-7467 MT/s; DDR5-6400 MT/s	96 GB; 128 GB	25 W (Min:12 W)	55 W	January 2026
Core Ultra X7	358H	4 (4)	1.9	4.8	8 (8)	1.5	3.7	4 (4)	1.5	3.3	Intel Arc B390 (12 Xe-cores)	?–2500	18 MB	50	LPDDR5X-9600 MT/s	96 GB	25 W (Min:15 W)	80 W	January 2026
Core Ultra 7	356H	4 (4)	1.9	4.7	8 (8)	1.5	3.7	4 (4)	1.5	3.3	Intel Graphics (4 Xe-cores)	?–2450	18 MB	50	LPDDR5X-8533 MT/s; DDR5-7200 MT/s	96 GB; 128 GB	25 W (Min:15 W)	80 W	January 2026
Core Ultra 7	355	4 (4)	2.3	4.7	—N/a			4 (4)	1.7	3.5	Intel Graphics (4 Xe-cores)	?–2500	12 MB	49	LPDDR5X-7467 MT/s; DDR5-6400 MT/s	96 GB; 128 GB	25 W (Min:12 W)	55 W	January 2026
Core Ultra 5	338H	4 (4)	1.9	4.7	4 (4)	1.5	3.6	4 (4)	1.5	3.3	Intel Arc B370 (10 Xe-cores)	?–2400	18 MB	47	LPDDR5X-8533 MT/s	96 GB	25 W (Min:15 W)	80 W	January 2026
Core Ultra 5	336H	4 (4)	1.9	4.6	4 (4)	1.5	3.6	4 (4)	1.5	3.2	Intel Graphics (4 Xe-cores)	?–2300	18 MB	47	LPDDR5X-8533 MT/s; DDR5-7200 MT/s	96 GB; 128 GB	25 W (Min:15 W)	80 W	January 2026
Core Ultra 5	335	4 (4)	2.2	4.6	—N/a			4 (4)	1.6	3.4	Intel Graphics (4 Xe-cores)	?–2450	12 MB	47	LPDDR5X-7467 MT/s; DDR5-6400 MT/s	96 GB; 128 GB	25 W (Min:12 W)	55 W	January 2026
Core Ultra 5	325	4 (4)	2.1	4.5	—N/a			4 (4)	1.6	3.4	Intel Graphics (4 Xe-cores)	?–2300	12 MB	47	LPDDR5X-7467 MT/s; DDR5-6400 MT/s	96 GB; 128 GB	25 W (Min:12 W)	55 W	January 2026
Core Ultra 5	332	2 (2)	2.5	4.4	—N/a			4 (4)	1.9	3.3	Intel Graphics (2 Xe-cores)	?–2450	12 MB	46	LPDDR5X-7467 MT/s; DDR5-6400 MT/s	96 GB; 128 GB	25 W (Min:12 W)	55 W	January 2026
Core Ultra 5	322	2 (2)	2.5	4.4	—N/a			4 (4)	1.9	3.3	Intel Graphics (2 Xe-cores)	?–2300	12 MB	46	LPDDR5X-7467 MT/s; DDR5-6400 MT/s	96 GB; 128 GB	25 W (Min:12 W)	55 W	January 2026

=== Wildcat Lake ===
Common features:

- All CPUs support single-channel DDR5-6400(max. 64 GB) and LPDDR5(X)-7467(max. 48 GB) RAM.
- Fabrication process: Intel's 18A process node.

Processor branding	Model	P-core (performance)			LPE-core (efficiency)			Integrated GPU		Smart Cache	NPU (TOPS)	TDP		Release date
Processor branding	Model	Cores (Threads)	Clock rate (GHz)		Cores (Threads)	Clock rate (GHz)		Model	Clock (MHz)	Smart Cache	NPU (TOPS)	Base	Max. Turbo	Release date
Processor branding	Model	Cores (Threads)	Base	Turbo	Cores (Threads)	Base	Turbo	Model	Clock (MHz)	Smart Cache	NPU (TOPS)	Base	Max. Turbo	Release date
Core 7	360	2 (2)	1.5	4.8	4 (4)	1.4	3.6	Intel Graphics (2 Xe-cores)	?–2600	6 MB	17	15 W	35 W	April 2026
Core 7	350	2 (2)	1.5	4.8	4 (4)	1.4	3.6	Intel Graphics (2 Xe-cores)	?–2600	6 MB	17	15 W	35 W	April 2026
Core 5	330	2 (2)	1.5	4.6	4 (4)	1.4	3.4	Intel Graphics (2 Xe-cores)	?–2500	6 MB	16	15 W	35 W	April 2026
Core 5	320	2 (2)	1.5	4.6	4 (4)	1.4	3.4	Intel Graphics (2 Xe-cores)	?–2500	6 MB	16	15 W	35 W	April 2026
Core 5	315	2 (2)	1.5	4.4	4 (4)	1.4	3.3	Intel Graphics (2 Xe-cores)	?-2300	6 MB	15	15 W	35 W	April 2026
Core 3	304	1(1)	1.5	4.3	4 (4)	1.4	3.3	Intel Graphics (1 Xe-core)	?-2300	6 MB	15	15 W	35 W	April 2026

== See also ==
- List of Intel Core desktop processors
- List of Intel Pentium M microprocessors
- List of Intel Celeron processors
- List of Intel Pentium processors
- Intel Core
- Intel Core 2
- Comparison of Intel processors
- Enhanced Pentium M (microarchitecture)
- Intel Core (microarchitecture)
- Penryn (microarchitecture)
- Alder Lake (microprocessor)
