= Socket G2 =

CPU socket for Intel mobile processors

Socket G2 aka FCPGA988
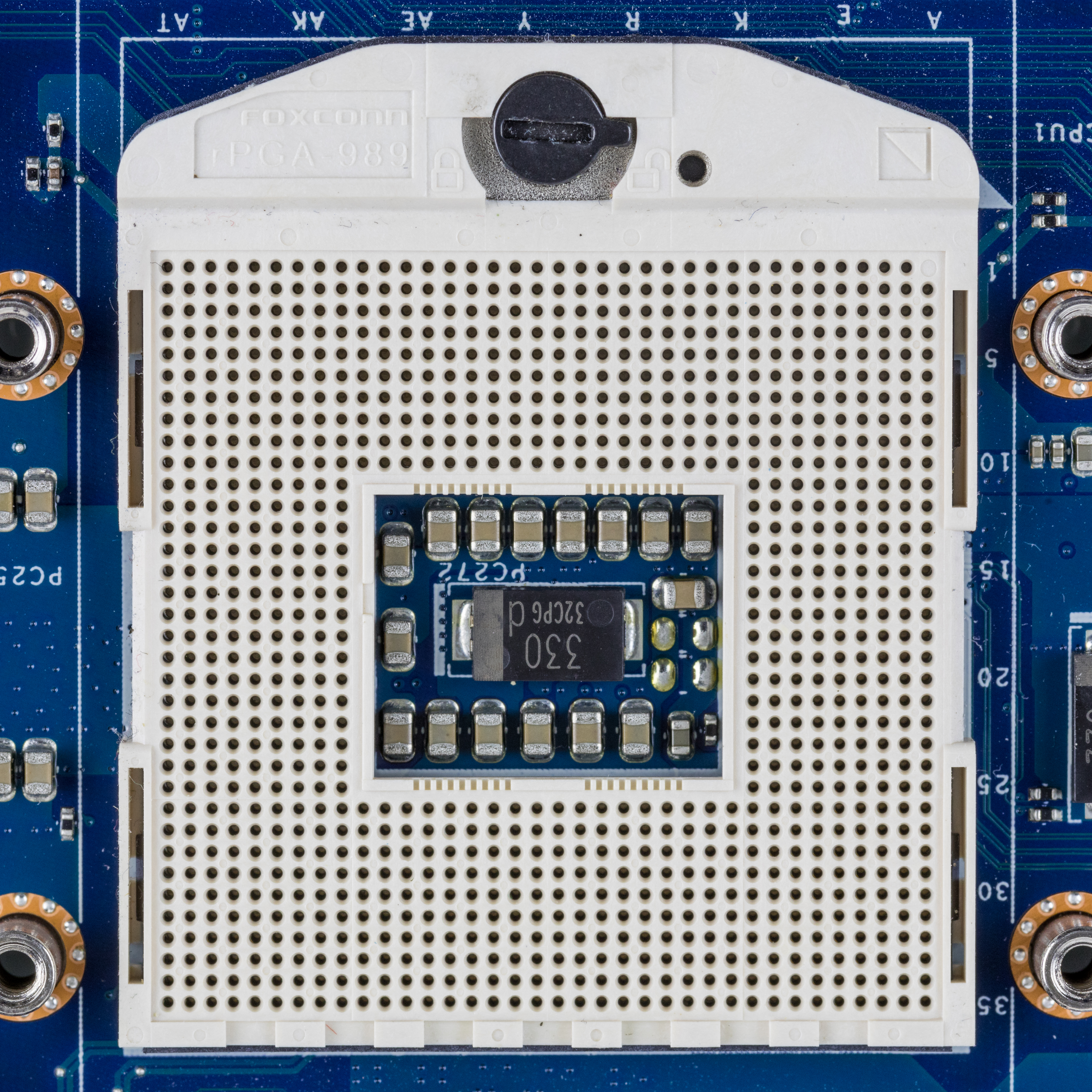
- Type: rPGA
- Chip form factors: Flip-chip pin grid array
- Contacts: 988
- FSB protocol: DMI
- FSB frequency: 2.5 GT/s, 4.8 GT/s
- Voltage range: Max. 5 V with max. of 500 mA per pin
- Processor dimensions: 37.5 × 37.5 mm
- Processors: Intel "Sandy Bridge" (32 nm) Core i7 Quad-Core i7-2960XM, i7-2920XM, i7-2860QM, i7-2820QM, i7-2760QM, i7-2720QM, i7-2710QE, i7-2670QM, i7-2630QM Core i7 Dual-Core i7-2620M, i7-2640M Core i5 Dual-Core i5-2540M, i5-2520M, i5-2510E, i5-2450M, i5-2435M, i5-2430M, i5-2415M, i5-2410M Core i3 Dual-Core i3-2370M, i3-2350M, i3-2348M, i3-2332M, i3-2330M, i3-2330E, i3-2328M, i3-2312M, i3-2310M, i3-2310E, i3-2308M Pentium B980, B970, B960, B950, B940 Celeron B840, B830, B820, B815, B810, B805, B800, B730, B720 Intel "Ivy Bridge" (22 nm) Core i7 Quad-Core i7-3940XM, i7-3920XM, i7-3820QM, i7-3840QM, i7-3720QM, i7-3740QM, i7-3632QM, i7-3630QM, i7-3612QM, i7-3612QE, i7-3610QM Core i7 Dual-Core i7-3520M, i7-3540M Core i5 Dual-Core i5-3380M, i5-3360M, i5-3340M, i5-3330M, i5-3320M, i5-3230M, i5-3210M Core i3 Dual-Core i3-3130M, i3-3120M, i3-3120ME, i3-3110M Pentium 2030M, 2020M, A1018 Celeron 1020M, 1020E, 1005M, 1000M
- Predecessor: rPGA 988A (Socket G1)
- Successor: rPGA 946B/947 (Socket G3)
- This article is part of the CPU socket series

Socket G2, also known as rPGA 988B, is Intel's CPU socket used with their line of mobile Core i7, the successor to the Core 2 line, and also with several mobile Core i5 and Core i3 processors. It is based on Intel's Sandy Bridge and Ivy Bridge architecture. Like its predecessor, socket G1 systems, it can only run in dual-channel memory mode, but with data rates up to 1600 MHz (as opposed to the triple-channel mode which is unique to the LGA-1366 platform and subsequent Xeon sockets). Socket G2 CPUs are also known as FCPGA988 socket processors, which should be pin compatible with PPGA988.

Although nearly all motherboards using this socket are intended for mobile products like laptops, a few desktop boards using this do exist. Supermicro, for example, produced a number of mini ITX motherboards using the QM77 chipset.

== Technical specifications ==
- Pins arranged in a 35 × 36 grid array (it is incompatible with G1 socket due to different placing of one pin)
- 18 × 15 size grid removed from the center
- Utilization of cam-actuated retention mechanism
- The r in rPGA refers to reduced pitch which is 1 mm × 1 mm in this socket design.

rPGA 989 (as shown on the right) is a socket that can take Socket G1 (rPGA988A) or Socket G2 (rPGA988B) processors.

Supported memory:

- DDR3 SoDIMM (1066-1333 MHz, Sandy Bridge); DDR3\DDR3L 1600 may work without DDR3L power optimisations and with 1333 MHz clock speed.
- DDR3 SoDIMM (1066-1600 MHz, Sandy Bridge Core i7-2720QM and faster).
- DDR3/DDR3L SoDIMM (1066-1600 MHz, Ivy Bridge).

== See also ==
- List of Intel microprocessors
- Micro-FCPGA
- Socket G3
- Socket G1
- Socket P
- Socket M
