= Intel Socket G3 =

Socket for Intel microprocessors

Socket G3
- Type: rPGA
- Chip form factors: Flip-chip pin grid array
- Contacts: 946
- FSB protocol: DMI
- Processor dimensions: 37.5 mm × 37.5 mm
- Processors: Intel "Haswell-MB" (22 nm) Core i7 Dual-Core i7-4600M, i7-4610M Core i7 Quad-Core i7-4700MQ, i7-4702MQ, i7-4710MQ, i7-4712MQ, i7-4800MQ, i7-4810MQ, i7-4900MQ, i7-4910MQ, i7-4930MX, i7-4940MX Core i5 Dual-Core i5-4200M, i5-4210M, i5-4300M, i5-4310M, i5-4330M, i5-4340M Core i3 Dual-Core i3-4000M, i3-4010M, i3-4100M, i3-4110M Pentium Dual-Core 3550M, 3560M Celeron Dual-core 2950M, 2970M
- Predecessor: rPGA 988B
- Successor: none
- This article is part of the CPU socket series

Socket G3, also known as rPGA 946B/947 or FCPGA 946, is a socket for Intel microprocessors that supports Haswell-based mobile CPUs. Compatible SKUs have an 'M' suffix in the model number.

Socket G3 is designed as a replacement for the Socket G2, which is also known as rPGA 988B. Socket G3 has holes to make contact with 946 or 947 pins of the processor's pin grid array (PGA).

Lynx Point is the Platform Controller Hub (PCH) associated with Socket G3.

Socket rPGA 947 has one extra pin hole, other than that it is identical to socket G3. It is the last pin grid array socket for Intel's mobile processors - all mobile processors in microarchitectures succeeding Haswell are exclusively available in BGA packaging. AMD also adopted the same practice, starting with their Steamroller microarchitecture.

== See also ==
- List of Intel microprocessors
- Micro-FCPGA
- Socket G2
- Socket G1
- Socket P
- Socket M
