= Socket 47x =

Socket 47x may refer to:

- Socket 478 (mPGA478, mPGA478B)
- Socket 479 (mPGA479M)
- Socket M (mPGA478MT)
- Socket P (mPGA478MN)
