= Arrendale =

Arrendale may refer to:

- Arrandale microprocessor, an Intel mobile processor, based on Westmere microarchitecture.
- Arrendale State Prison, a women's prison located Alto, Georgia.
