= Merom (microprocessor) =

Code name for various mobile Intel processors

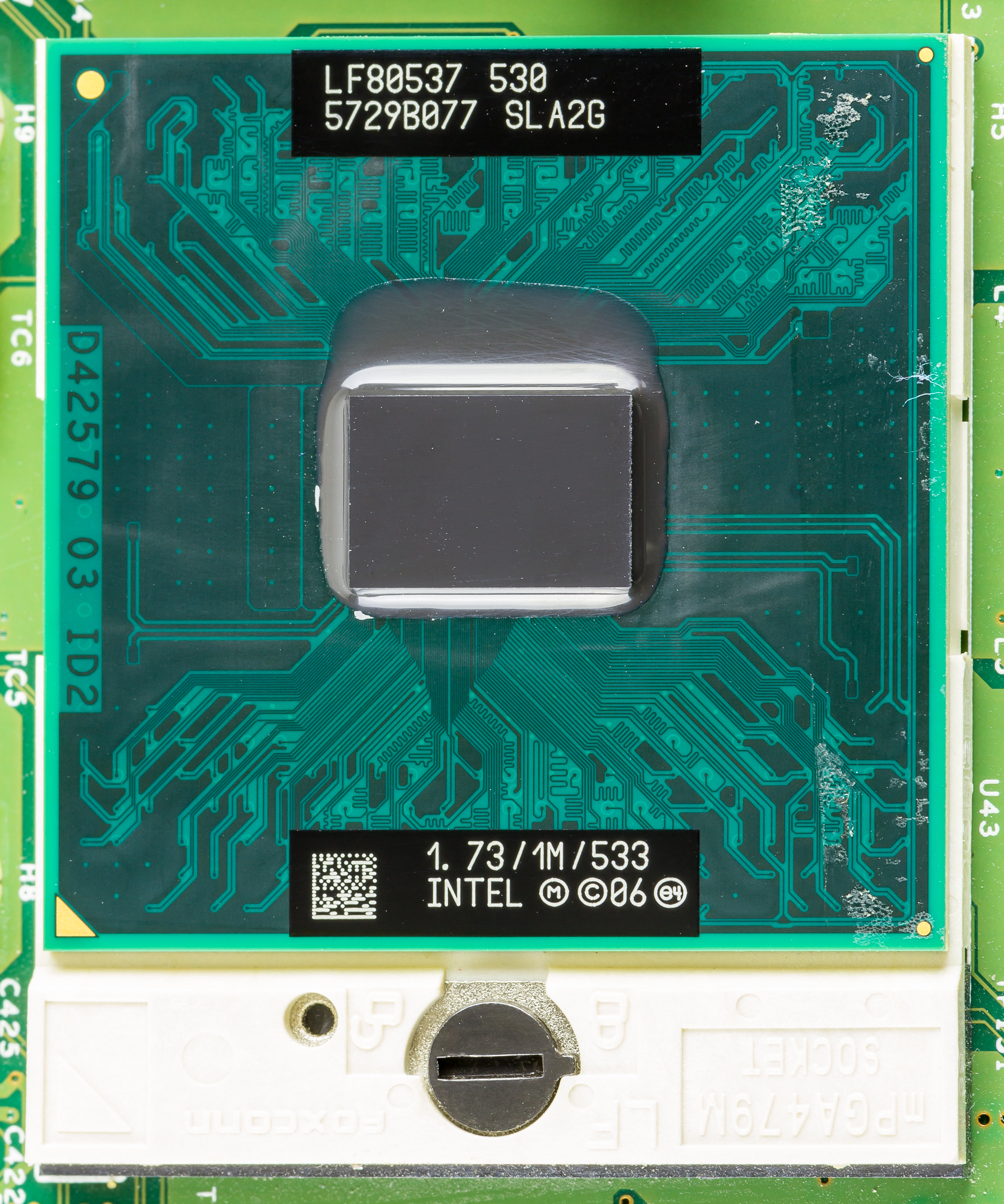
- Celeron M 530 - SLA2G - 1.73GHz, 1 MB L2 Cache, 533 MT/s FSB

General information
- Launched: 2006
- Discontinued: 2009
- Marketed by: Intel
- Designed by: Intel
- Common manufacturer: Intel
- CPUID code: 06Fx (Merom-L: 1066x)
- Product code: 80537

Performance
- Max. CPU clock rate: 1.6 GHz to 2.8 GHz
- FSB speeds: 533 MHz to 800 MHz

Physical specifications
- Cores: 2 (Merom-L: 1)
- Sockets: Socket M; Socket P

Cache
- L1 cache: 32 KB instruction, 32 KB data per core
- L2 cache: Merom: 4 MB; Merom-2M: 2 MB; Merom-L: 1 MB

Architecture and classification
- Application: Mobile
- Technology node: 65 nm
- Microarchitecture: Core
- Instruction set: x86_64 (64-bit)

Products, models, variants
- Brand names: Mobile Celeron 5xx; Mobile Celeron Dual-Core E1xxx; Mobile Pentium Dual-Core T2xxx; Mobile Pentium Dual-Core T3xxx; Core 2 Duo T5xxx; Core 2 Duo T7xxx; Core 2 Duo L7xxx; Core 2 Duo U7xxx; Core 2 Solo U2xxx

History
- Predecessor: Yonah
- Successor: Penryn

Support status
- Unsupported

Merom is the code name for various mobile Intel processors that are sold as Core 2 Duo, Core 2 Solo, Pentium Dual-Core and Celeron. It was the first mobile processor to be based on the Core microarchitecture, replacing the Enhanced Pentium M-based Yonah processor. Merom has the product code 80537, which is shared with Merom-2M and Merom-L that are very similar but have a smaller L2 cache. Merom-L has only one processor core and a different CPUID model. The desktop version of Merom is Conroe and the dual-socket server version is Woodcrest. Merom was manufactured in a 65 nanometer process, and was succeeded by Penryn, a 45 nm version of the Merom architecture. Together, Penryn and Merom represented the first 'tick-tock' in Intel's Tick-Tock manufacturing paradigm, in which Penryn was the 'tick' (new process) to Merom's 'tock' (new architecture).

== Variants ==
Processor	Brand name	Model (list)	Cores	L2 Cache	Socket	TDP
Merom-L	Mobile Core 2 Solo	U2xxx	1	2 MiB	BGA479	5.5 W
Merom-2M	Mobile Core 2 Duo	U7xxx	2	2 MiB	BGA479	10 W
Merom	Mobile Core 2 Duo	L7xxx	2	4 MiB	BGA479	17 W
Merom; Merom-2M	Mobile Core 2 Duo	T5xxx; T7xxx	2	2-4 MiB	Socket M Socket P BGA479	35 W
Merom	Mobile Core 2 Extreme	X7xxx	2	4 MiB	Socket P	44 W
Merom	Celeron M (Socket M) and Celeron (Socket P)	5x0	1	1024 KiB	Socket M Socket P	30 W
Merom-L	Celeron M (Socket M) and Celeron (Socket P)	5x0	1	1024 KiB	Socket M Socket P	27 W
Merom-2M	Celeron M (Socket M) and Celeron (Socket P)	5x5	1	1024 KiB	Socket P	31 W
Merom-L	Celeron M (Socket M) and Celeron (Socket P)	5x3	1	512-1024 KiB	BGA479	5.5-10 W
Merom-2M	Celeron Dual-Core	T1xxx	2	512-1024 KiB	Socket P	35 W
Merom-2M	Pentium Dual-Core	T2xxx; T3xxx	2	1 MiB	Socket P	35 W

=== Merom ===
Merom, the first mobile version of the Core 2, was officially released on July 27, 2006, but quietly began shipping to PC manufacturers in mid-July, alongside Conroe. Merom became Intel's premier line of mobile processors, with mostly the same features as Conroe, but with a greater emphasis on low power consumption to enhance notebook battery life. Merom-based Core 2 Duo provides a slight performance increase associated with 3D rendering and media-encoding tasks, yet maintains the same battery life as the Yonah-based Core Duo. Merom is the first Intel mobile processor to feature Intel 64 architecture.

The first version of Merom is "drop-in" compatible with Napa platform for Core Duo, requiring at most a motherboard BIOS update. It has a similar thermal envelope of 34 W and the same 667 MT/s FSB rate. The Merom die features 4 MB L2 cache, half of which is deactivated in the T5xx0 CPUs. A native 2 MB L2 version of the Merom core, called Merom-2M, was rolled out in early 2007 as a counterpart to Allendale. The Merom-2M core uses the steppings L2 and M0 and the ultra-low-voltage versions of the Core 2 Duo use this core.

A second wave of Merom processors featuring an 800 MT/s FSB and using the new Socket P was launched on May 9, 2007. These chips are part of Santa Rosa platform. Low voltage versions were also released on May 9, 2007.

Merom (מרום) is the Hebrew word for a higher plane of existence or a level of heaven; BaMerom (במרום) means "in the heavens". The name was chosen by the Intel team in Haifa, Israel, who designed this processor.

==== Merom XE ====
The Core 2 Extreme Mobile processor, based on the Merom XE core, is a mobile CPU designed for laptops. It was released in two models, the X7900 and the X7800. These feature an 800 MT/s FSB. The X7800, introduced on July 16, 2007, is clocked at 2.6 GHz and costs around $851 for OEMs. The processor features a 44 W TDP and requires the new Intel Centrino (Santa Rosa) platform. The X7900, introduced on August 22, 2007, is clocked at 2.8 GHz.

The X7900 processor was used in the top-end iMacs released on August 7, 2007.

=== Merom-2M ===
The mobile version of the Allendale desktop processor is often called Merom-2M to identify the smaller L2 cache. Some T5xxx and T7xxx processors have come out with both Merom and Merom-2M dies, which can only be distinguished through their stepping number.

=== Merom-L ===
The Merom-L processor is based on the same model as Conroe-L but is used in mobile Socket M and Socket P systems as Celeron 5xx and Core 2 Solo U2xxx, some of which also use regular Merom and Merom-2M chips with one core disabled in contrast to the real Merom-L that only has 1 MB L2 cache and a single core. The CPUID is family 6 model 23 (10661h), which is between Merom and Penryn.

The first Core 2 Solo processors were launched in Q3 2007 and consisted of the U2100 and U2200, which run at 1.06 and 1.2 GHz, respectively. They both feature a 533 MT/s FSB and are part of Intel's ULV family, running at only 5 W. Like the rest of the Core 2 family, they are 64-bit compatible. They were released with compatibility for the Napa platform rather than the newer Santa Rosa platform due to power consumption concerns.

== Fixes ==
Microsoft has released a microcode update (KB2493989) for Windows 7 that addresses several stability issues on selected "Penryn" and "Merom" CPUs.

== See also ==
- Yonah (microprocessor)
- Conroe (microprocessor)
- Penryn (microprocessor)
- Celeron
- Pentium Dual-Core
- Intel Core 2
- List of Macintosh models grouped by CPU type
