= Socket G1 =

CPU socket from Intel

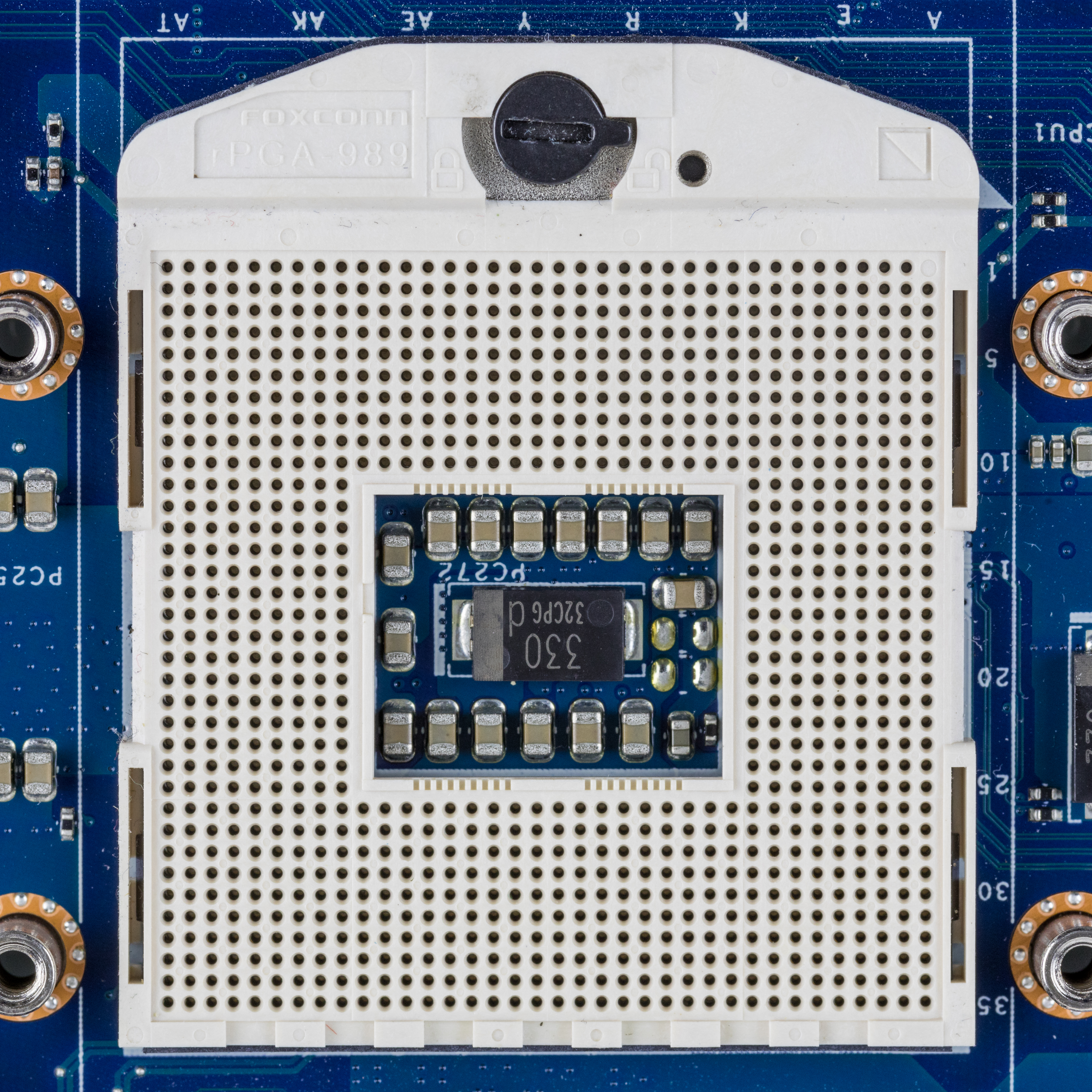
- Type: rPGA
- Chip form factors: Flip-chip pin grid array
- Contacts: 988
- FSB protocol: DMI
- FSB frequency: 2.5GT/s
- Voltage range: Max. 1.4 V (core); Max. 1.55 V (graphics)
- Processor dimensions: 37.5 × 37.5 mm
- Processors: Clarksfield; Arrandale
- Predecessor: Socket P
- Successor: rPGA 988B
- Memory support: DDR3
- This article is part of the CPU socket series

Socket G1, also known as rPGA 988A, is a CPU socket introduced by Intel in 2009 for the mobile variants of the first-generation Intel Core processors. It is the successor to Socket P, and the mobile counterpart to LGA 1156 and LGA 1366.

== History ==
The first CPUs for the Socket G1 platform were released on September 23, 2009, in the form of the i7-720QM, 820QM, and 920XM. These CPUs use the Clarksfield core, which maintained the same 45 nm manufacturing process as the desktop Nehalem architecture. On January 4, 2010, the range was expanded with Core i3, i5, and i7 processors using the 32 nm Arrandale core and based on the Westmere architecture. On March 28, 2010, low-end Arrandale-based CPUs were released as the Pentium P6x00 series and Celeron P4x00 series. Further Clarksfield-based processors were released as the i7-740QM, 840QM, and 940XM on June 21, 2010. All Socket G1 processors, except for the quad-core i7 CPUs have the Intel HD Graphics Ironlake core packaged onto the CPU substrate.

== Supported processors ==
Intel Core i7 Quad-Core
i7-720QM, i7-740QM, i7-820QM, i7-840QM, i7-920XM, i7-940XM
Intel Core i7 Dual-Core
i7-620M, i7-640M
Intel Core i5 Dual-Core
i5-430M, i5-450M, i5-460M, i5-480M, i5-520M, i5-540M, i5-560M, i5-580M
Intel Core i3 Dual-Core
i3-330M, i3-350M, i3-370M, i3-380M, i3-390M
Intel Pentium
P6000, P6100, P6200, P6300
Intel Celeron
P4500, P4600

== Technical specifications ==
- Pins arranged in a 36 × 35 grid array
- 18 × 15 size grid removed from the center
- Utilization of cam actuated retention mechanism
- The r in rPGA refers to "Reduced pitch" which is 1mm × 1mm in this socket design.
- Socket G1 systems can only run in dual-channel memory mode, compared to the triple-channel mode of LGA 1366, as a result of the lower pin count.

== See also ==
- List of Intel processors
- Socket M
- Socket G2
- Socket P
