= Arrandale =

Family of computer processors by Intel

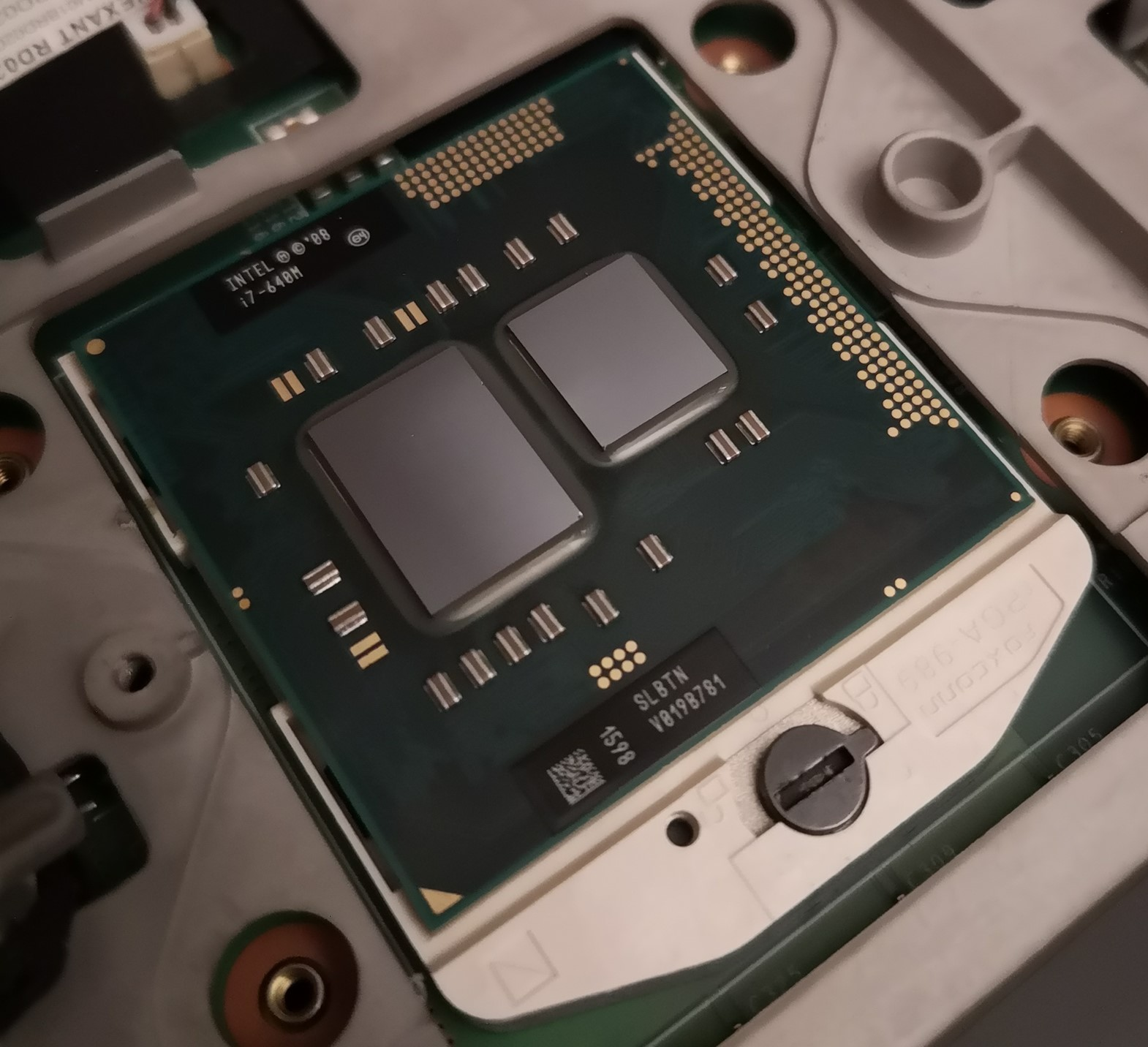
- The mobile Core i7-640M. The large die (on the left) is the iGPU+IMC+PCIe component and the small die (on the right) is the CPU.

General information
- Launched: 2010
- Marketed by: Intel
- Designed by: Intel
- Common manufacturer: Intel
- Product code: 80617

Performance
- Max. CPU clock rate: 1.06 GHz to 2.80 GHz

Physical specifications
- Cores: 2
- Memory (RAM): Up to 8 GB; Up to dual-channel DDR3-1333
- GPU: Intel HD Graphics
- Socket: rPGA-988; BGA-1288

Cache
- L1 cache: 128 KB (64 KB (32 KB instructions + 32 KB data) per core)
- L2 cache: 512 KB (256 KB per core)
- L3 cache: Up to 4 MB

Architecture and classification
- Application: Dual-core mobile
- Technology node: 32 nm
- Microarchitecture: Westmere
- Instruction set: x86, x86-64, MMX, SSE, SSE2, SSE3, SSSE3, SSE4.1, SSE4.2, AES-NI

Products, models, variants
- Brand names: Celeron P4xxx/U3xxx; Pentium P6xxx/U5xxx; Core i3-3xxUM/3xxM; Core i5-4xxUM/4xxM; Core i5-5xxUM/5xxM; Core i7-6xxUM/6xxLM/6xxM

History
- Predecessor: Penryn
- Successor: Sandy Bridge

Support status
- Unsupported

Arrandale is the code name for a family of mobile Intel processors, sold as mobile Intel Core i3, i5 and i7 as well as Celeron and Pentium. It is closely related to the desktop Clarkdale processor; both use dual-core dies based on the Westmere 32 nm die shrink of the Nehalem microarchitecture, and have integrated Graphics as well as PCI Express and DMI links.

Arrandale is the successor of the 45 nm Core-microarchitecture-based Penryn processor that is used in many of the mobile Core 2, Celeron and Pentium Dual-Core processors. While Penryn typically used both a north bridge and a south bridge, Arrandale already contains the major northbridge components, which are the memory controller, PCI Express bus for external graphics, integrated graphics, and the DMI interface, making it possible to build more compact systems.

The Arrandale processor package contains two dies: the 32 nm processor die with the I/O connections, and the 45 nm Intel HD Graphics (Ironlake) controller and integrated memory controller die. Physical separation of the processor die and memory controller die resulted in increased memory latency.

Arrandale was released on 7 January 2010, during CES 2010. The code name Arrandale is named after its namesake place in British Columbia.

== Brand names ==
Arrandale processors were sold under the Celeron, Pentium, Intel Core i3, Intel Core i5 and Intel Core i7 brand names, with only the Core i7 models using the full L3 cache and all features. Processors ending in E instead of M are embedded versions with support for PCIe bifurcation and ECC memory, while the regular mobile versions only support a single PCIe port and non-ECC memory. The Celeron versions of Arrandale have the smallest L3 cache of just 2 MB.

Brand Name	Model (list)	L3 Cache size	Thermal Design Power
Intel Celeron	P4xxx	2 MB	35 W
Intel Celeron	U3xxx	2 MB	18 W
Intel Pentium	P6xxx	3 MB	35 W
Intel Pentium	U5xxx	3 MB	18 W
Intel Core i3	i3-3xxM	3 MB	35 W
Intel Core i3	i3-3xxUM	3 MB	18 W
Intel Core i5	i5-4xxM, i5-5xxM, i5-5xxE	3 MB	35 W
Intel Core i5	i5-4xxUM, i5-5xxUM	3 MB	18 W
Intel Core i7	i7-6xxM, i7-6xxE	4 MB	35 W
Intel Core i7	i7-6xxLM, i7-6xxLE	4 MB	25 W
Intel Core i7	i7-6xxUM, i7-6xxUE	4 MB	18 W

== See also ==
- Consumer Ultra-Low Voltage (CULV) computing platform
- List of Macintosh models grouped by CPU type
