= Pentium Dual-Core =

Line of CPUs by Intel

General information
- Launched: 2007
- Discontinued: 2010
- Common manufacturer: Intel

Performance
- Max. CPU clock rate: 1.3 GHz to 3.4 GHz
- FSB speeds: 533 MHz to 1066 MHz

Physical specifications
- Transistors: 376 million to 410 million
- Cores: 2
- Sockets: LGA 775; Socket M; Socket P

Architecture and classification
- Technology node: 65 nm to 45 nm
- Microarchitecture: Core, Penryn
- Instruction set: MMX, SSE, SSE2, SSE3, SSSE3, x86-64, VT-x (some)

Products, models, variants
- Core names: Yonah; Merom-2M; Allendale; Wolfdale-3M

History
- Predecessors: Pentium M (mobile); Pentium 4 (desktop)
- Successor: Pentium (2009)

Support status
- Unsupported

The Pentium Dual-Core brand was used for mainstream x86-architecture microprocessors from Intel as a replacement for both the Pentium M and Pentium 4 brands as entry-level options, from 2007 to 2010, when it was renamed to Pentium. The processors are based on either the 32-bit Yonah or (with quite different microarchitectures) 64-bit Merom-2M, Allendale, and Wolfdale-3M core, targeted at mobile or desktop computers.

In terms of features, price, and performance at a given clock frequency, Pentium Dual-Core processors were positioned above Celeron but below Core and Core 2 processors in Intel's product range. The Pentium Dual-Core was also a very popular choice for overclocking, as it can deliver high performance (when overclocked) at a low price.

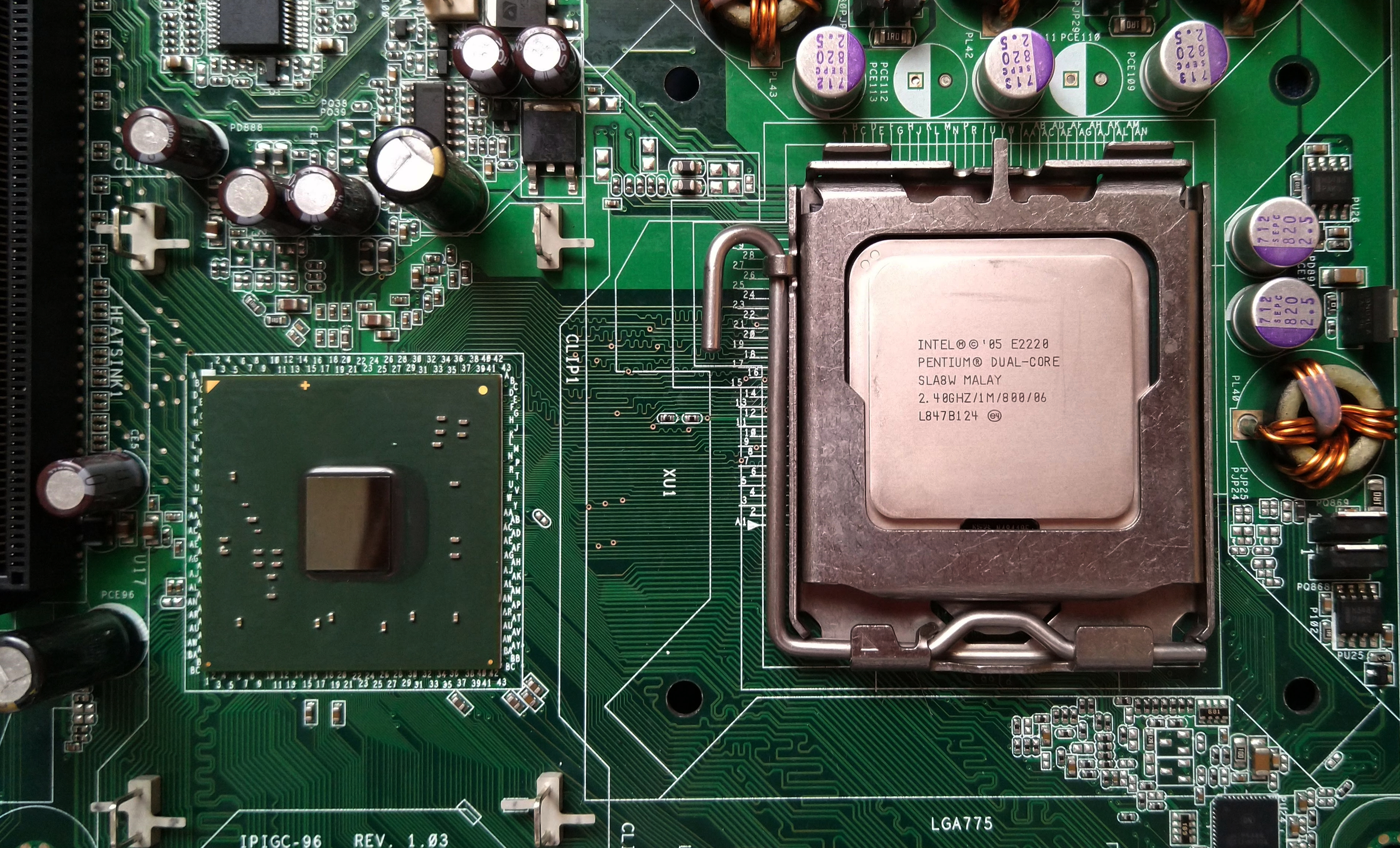
Pentium Dual-Core E2220 2.40 (Allendale) with Intel i945GC Chipset

== Processor cores ==
In 2006, Intel announced a plan to return the Pentium trademark from retirement to the market, as a moniker of low-cost Core microarchitecture processors based on the single-core Conroe-L but with 1 MB of cache. The identification numbers for those planned Pentiums were similar to the numbers of the latter Pentium Dual-Core microprocessors, but with the first digit "1" instead of "2", suggesting their single-core function. A single-core Conroe-L with 1 MB cache was deemed as not strong enough to distinguish the planned Pentiums from the Celerons, so it was replaced by dual-core central processing units (CPU), adding "Dual-Core" to the line's name. Throughout 2009, Intel changed the name from Pentium Dual-Core to Pentium in its publications. Some processors were sold under both names, but the newer E5400 through E6800 desktop and SU4100/T4x00 mobile processors were not officially part of the Pentium Dual-Core line.

Intel Pentium Dual-Core processor family
| Original logo | Rebranded logo | Desktop | | | Laptop | | |
| Original logo | Rebranded logo | Code-named | Core | Date released | Code-named | Core | Date released |
|---|---|---|---|---|---|---|---|
| Pentium Dual-Core logo as of 2006 | Pentium Logo after rebranding | Allendale; Wolfdale | dual (65 nm) dual (45 nm) | Jun 2007; Aug 2008 | Yonah; Merom; Penryn | dual (65 nm) dual (65 nm) dual (45 nm) | Jan 2007; Nov 2007; Dec 2008 |
List of Intel Pentium Dual-Core processors

=== Yonah ===
The first processors using the brand appeared in notebook computers on January 30, 2007. Those processors, named Pentium T2060, T2080, and T2130, had the 32-bit Pentium M-derived Yonah core, and closely resembled the Core Duo T2050 processor with the exception of having 1 MB of L2 cache instead of 2 MB. All three of them had a 533 MHz front-side bus (FSB) connecting the CPU with the double-data rate synchronous dynamic random-access memory (DDR SDRAM). Intel developed the Pentium Dual-Core at the request of laptop manufacturers.

=== Allendale ===
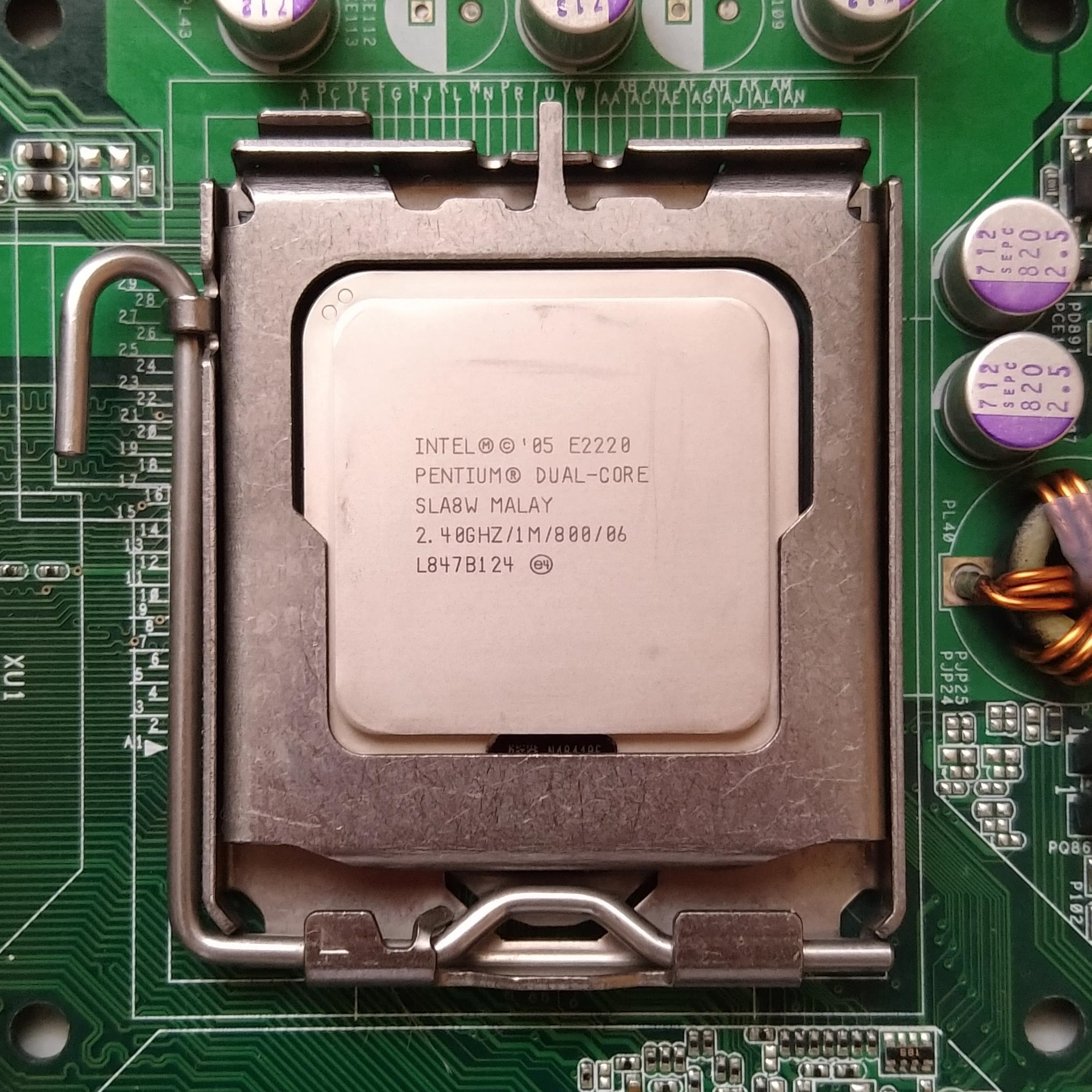
Intel Pentium E2220 @ 2.40GHz (Allendale) installed

Subsequently, on June 3, 2007, Intel released the desktop Pentium Dual-Core branded processors known as the Pentium E2140 and E2160. An E2180 model was released later in September 2007. These processors support the Intel 64 extensions, being based on the newer, 64-bit Allendale core with Core microarchitecture. These closely resembled the Core 2 Duo E4300 processor, with the exception of having 1 MB of L2 cache instead of 2 MB. Both of them had an 800 MHz front-side bus (FSB). They targeted the budget market above the Intel Celeron (Conroe-L single-core series) processors featuring only 512 KB of L2 cache. Such a step marked a change in the Pentium brand, relegating it to the budget segment rather than its former position as a mainstream or premium brand. These CPUs are highly overclockable.

=== Merom-2M ===
The mobile version of the Allendale processor, the Merom-2M, was also introduced in 2007, featuring 1MB of L2 cache but only 533 MT/s FSB with the T23xx processors. The bus clock was subsequently raised to 667 MT/s with the T3xxx Pentium processors made from the same dies.

=== Wolfdale-3M ===
The 45 nm E5200 model was released by Intel on August 31, 2008, with a larger 2MB L2 cache over the 65 nm E21xx series and the 2.5 GHz clock speed. The E5200 model is also a highly overclockable processor, with many reaching over 3.75 GHz clock speed using just the stock Intel cooler. Intel released the E6500K model using this core. The model features an unlocked multiplier, but was only sold in China.

=== Penryn-3M ===
The Penryn core is the successor to the Merom core and Intel's 45 nm version of their mobile series of Pentium Dual-Core processors. The FSB is increased from 667 MHz to 800 MHz and the voltage is lowered. Intel released the first Penryn-based Pentium Dual-Core, the T4200, in December 2008. Later, mobile Pentium T4000, SU2000, and SU4000 processors based on Penryn were marketed as Pentium.

== Rebranding ==
The Pentium Dual-Core brand was discontinued in early 2010 and replaced by the Pentium name. The Desktop E6000 series and the OEM-only mobile Pentium SU2000, and all later models were always called Pentium, but the Desktop Pentium Dual-Core E2000 and E5000 series processors had to be rebranded. For example, rebranding from "Pentium Dual-Core" to "Pentium" occurred on desktop processors if the BIOS date is after January 1, 2011. Similarly, Linux and other operating systems may not rebrand Core-based Pentiums if the BIOS date is before January 1, 2013.

== Comparison to the Pentium D ==
Although using the Pentium name, the desktop Pentium Dual-Core is based on the Core microarchitecture, which can be seen when comparing the specification to the Pentium D, which is based on the NetBurst microarchitecture first introduced in the Pentium 4. Below the 2 or 4 MB of shared-L2-cache-enabled Core 2 Duo, the desktop Pentium Dual-Core has 1 or 2 MB of shared L2 Cache. In contrast, the Pentium D processors have either 2 or 4 MB of non-shared L2 cache. Additionally, the fastest-clocked Pentium D has a factory boundary of 3.73 GHz, while the fastest-clocked desktop Pentium Dual-Core reaches 3.2 GHz. A significant difference among these processors is that the desktop Pentium Dual-Core processors have a TDP of only 65 W while the Pentium D ranges between 95 and 130 W. The Pentium Dual-Core outperforms the Pentium D by a reasonably large margin despite the reduced clock speed and lower amounts of cache.

== See also ==
- Pentium
- List of Intel Pentium processors
