= Westmere (microarchitecture) =

CPU microarchitecture by Intel

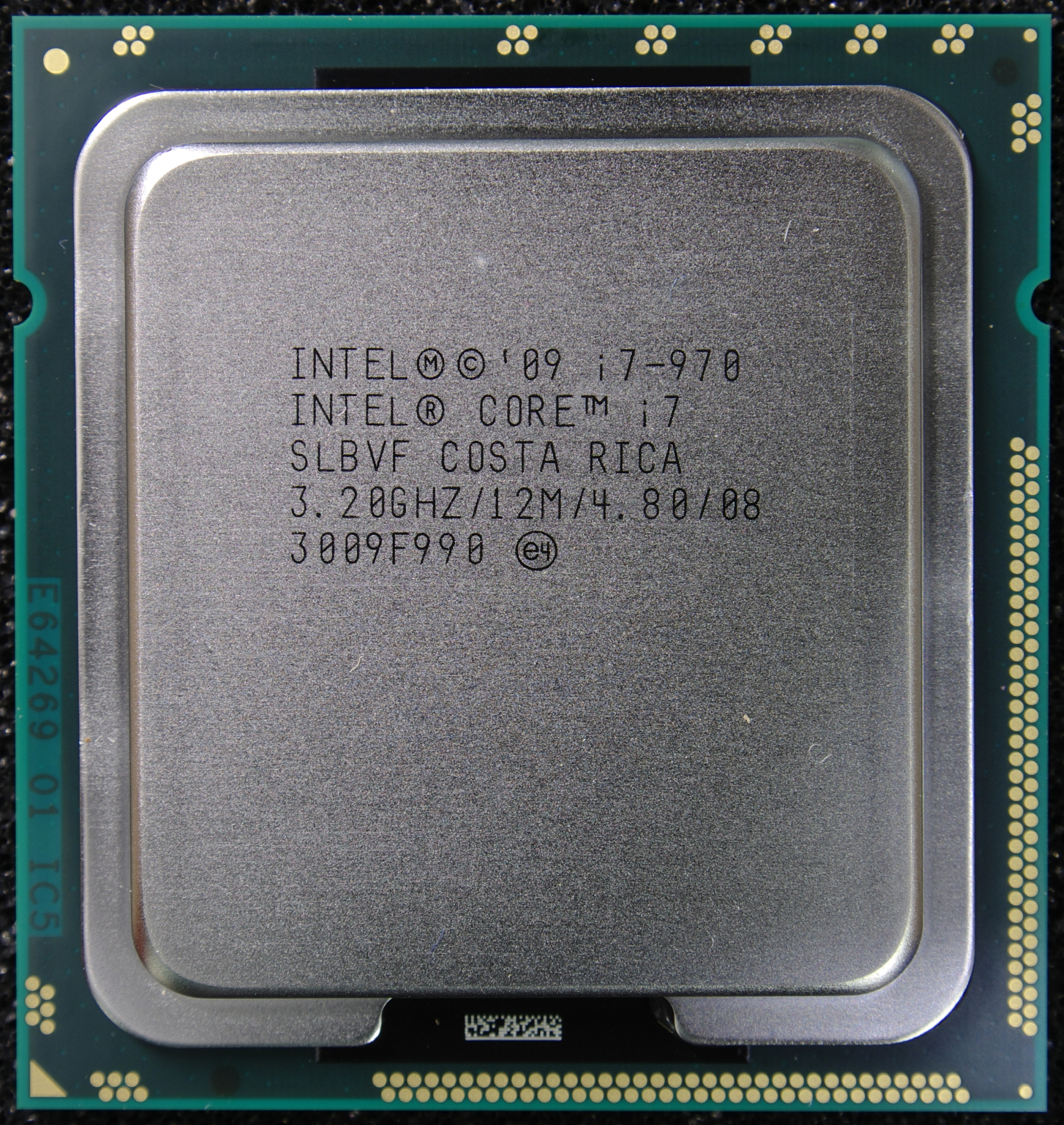
- Topside of a Core i7-970

General information
- Launched: January 7, 2010; 16 years ago

Performance
- Max. CPU clock rate: 1.06 GHz to 3.86 GHz, 4.40GHz (OEM-only)
- QPI speeds: 4.80 GT/s to 6.40 GT/s
- DMI speeds: 2.50 GT/s

Physical specifications
- Transistors: 382M to 2600M 32nm
- Cores: 2-6 (client), up to 10 (server)
- GPUs: 533 MHz to 900 MHz; 177M 45nm (K0)
- Sockets: LGA 1156; LGA 1366; LGA 1567; rPGA988A

Cache
- L1 cache: 64 KB per core
- L2 cache: 256 KB per core
- L3 cache: 2 to 30 MB shared

Architecture and classification
- Microarchitecture: Nehalem
- Instruction set: x86-16, IA-32, x86-64
- Extensions: AES-NI, CLMUL; MMX, SSE, SSE2, SSE3, SSSE3, SSE4.1, SSE4.2; VT-x, VT-d

Products, models, variants
- Model: Core in, Xeon

History
- Predecessor: Nehalem
- Successor: Sandy Bridge

Support status
- Unsupported

Connection of the GPU inside the Westmere microarchitecture

Westmere (formerly Nehalem-C) is a CPU microarchitecture developed by Intel. It is a scaled-down version of its predecessor, Nehalem, and shares the same CPU sockets with it. Some Westmere models have integrated graphics processors, branded as Intel HD Graphics, that support DirectX 10.1 and OpenGL 2.1 API.

The first Westmere-based processors were released on January 7, 2010. They were labeled under Intel's Core, Pentium, Celeron, and Xeon brandings.

== Technology ==
Westmere's feature improvements from Nehalem, as reported, include:

- Native six-core (Gulftown) and ten-core (Westmere-EX) processors.
- AES-NI instruction set support:
  - Out of the total seven new instructions, six implement the AES algorithm specifically, the remaining PCLMULQDQ instruction (see CLMUL instruction set) accelerates carry-less multiplication for use in cryptography and data compression.
- Integrated graphics, fabricated on a separate die using 45 nm process, and added onto the processor package, beside the CPU die, (for dual core Arrandale and Clarkdale only).
- Improved virtualization latency and support for VMX Unrestricted mode, allowing 16-bit guests to run in real mode and big real mode.
- Support for "Huge Pages" of 1 GB in size.

Translation lookaside buffer sizes
Cache		Page size		
Name	Level	4 KB	2 MB	1 GB
DTLB	1st	64	32	—N/a
ITLB	1st	128	7 / logical core	—N/a
STLB	2nd	512	none	none

== CPU variants ==
Processing cores (memory interface)	Process	Die size	CPUID	Model	Stepping	Mobile	Desktop, UP server	DP server	MP server
Ten-Core (Quad-channel)	32 nm	513 mm^{2}	206F2	47	A2				Westmere-EX (80615)
Six-Core (Triple-Channel)	32 nm	248 mm^{2}	206C0 (ES/QS), 206C1 (ES/QS), 206C2	44	A0, B0, B1		Gulftown (80613)	Westmere-EP (80614)	
Dual-Core (Dual-Channel, PCIe, Graphics Core)	32 nm 45 nm (Integrated Graphics)	114 mm^{2} +81 mm^{2}	20652; 20655	37	C2; K0	Arrandale (80617)	Clarkdale (80616)		

== Westmere CPUs ==
Intel Xeon E7-2850 die shot (Westmere-EX)

- TDP includes the integrated GPU, if present.
- Clarkdale processors feature 16 PCIe 2.0 lanes, which can be used in 1x16 or 2x8 configuration.
- Clarkdale and Arrandale contain the 32 nm dual core processor Hillel and the 45 nm integrated graphics device Ironlake, and support switchable graphics.
- Only certain higher-end CPUs support AES-NI and 1GB Huge Pages.

=== Server / Desktop processors ===
Codename	Market	Cores / threads	Socket	Processor branding & model		Clock rate		Turbo	TDP	Interfaces		L3 cache	Release date	Price
Codename	Market	Cores / threads	Socket	Processor branding & model		Core	GPU	Turbo	TDP	Chipset	Memory	L3 cache	Release date	Price
Westmere-EX	MP Server	10 (20)	LGA; 1567	Xeon	E7-8870	2.4 GHz	—N/a	Yes	130 W	4× QPI 6.4 GT/s	4× DDR3-1066	30 MB	2011-04-05	$4616
Westmere-EX	MP Server	10 (20)	LGA; 1567	Xeon	E7-4870	2.4 GHz	—N/a	Yes	130 W	4× QPI 6.4 GT/s	4× DDR3-1066	30 MB	2011-04-05	$4394
Westmere-EX	MP Server	10 (20)	LGA; 1567	Xeon	E7-2870	2.4 GHz	—N/a	Yes	130 W	4× QPI 6.4 GT/s	4× DDR3-1066	30 MB	2011-04-05	$4227
Westmere-EX	MP Server	10 (20)	LGA; 1567	Xeon	E7-8867L	2.13 GHz	—N/a	Yes	105 W	4× QPI 6.4 GT/s	4× DDR3-1066	30 MB	2011-04-05	$4172
Westmere-EX	MP Server	10 (20)	LGA; 1567	Xeon	E7-8860	2.26 GHz	—N/a	Yes	130 W	4× QPI 6.4 GT/s	4× DDR3-1066	24 MB	2011-04-05	$4061
Westmere-EX	MP Server	10 (20)	LGA; 1567	Xeon	E7-4860	2.26 GHz	—N/a	Yes	130 W	4× QPI 6.4 GT/s	4× DDR3-1066	24 MB	2011-04-05	$3838
Westmere-EX	MP Server	10 (20)	LGA; 1567	Xeon	E7-2860	2.26 GHz	—N/a	Yes	130 W	4× QPI 6.4 GT/s	4× DDR3-1066	24 MB	2011-04-05	$3670
Westmere-EX	MP Server	10 (20)	LGA; 1567	Xeon	E7-8850	2 GHz	—N/a	Yes	130 W	4× QPI 6.4 GT/s	4× DDR3-1066	24 MB	2011-04-05	$3059
Westmere-EX	MP Server	10 (20)	LGA; 1567	Xeon	E7-4850	2 GHz	—N/a	Yes	130 W	4× QPI 6.4 GT/s	4× DDR3-1066	24 MB	2011-04-05	$2837
Westmere-EX	MP Server	10 (20)	LGA; 1567	Xeon	E7-2850	2 GHz	—N/a	Yes	130 W	4× QPI 6.4 GT/s	4× DDR3-1066	24 MB	2011-04-05	$2558
Westmere-EX	MP Server	8 (8)	LGA; 1567	Xeon	E7-8837	2.66 GHz	—N/a	Yes	130 W	4× QPI 6.4 GT/s	4× DDR3-1066	24 MB	2011-04-05	$2280
Westmere-EX	MP Server	8 (16)	LGA; 1567	Xeon	E7-8830	2.13 GHz	—N/a	Yes	105 W	4× QPI 6.4 GT/s	4× DDR3-1066	24 MB	2011-04-05	$2280
Westmere-EX	MP Server	8 (16)	LGA; 1567	Xeon	E7-4830	2.13 GHz	—N/a	Yes	105 W	4× QPI 6.4 GT/s	4× DDR3-1066	24 MB	2011-04-05	$2059
Westmere-EX	MP Server	8 (16)	LGA; 1567	Xeon	E7-2830	2.13 GHz	—N/a	Yes	105 W	4× QPI 6.4 GT/s	4× DDR3-1066	24 MB	2011-04-05	$1779
Westmere-EX	MP Server	8 (16)	LGA; 1567	Xeon	E7-4820	2 GHz	—N/a	Yes	105 W	4× QPI 5.86 GT/s	4× DDR3-1066	18 MB	2011-04-05	$1446
Westmere-EX	MP Server	8 (16)	LGA; 1567	Xeon	E7-2820	2 GHz	—N/a	Yes	105 W	4× QPI 5.86 GT/s	4× DDR3-1066	18 MB	2011-04-05	$1334
Westmere-EX	MP Server	6 (12)	LGA; 1567	Xeon	E7-4807	1.86 GHz	—N/a	No	95 W	4× QPI 4.8 GT/s	4× DDR3-800	18 MB	2011-04-05	$890
Westmere-EX	MP Server	6 (12)	LGA; 1567	Xeon	E7-2803	1.73 GHz	—N/a	No	105 W	4× QPI 4.8 GT/s	4× DDR3-800	18 MB	2011-04-05	$774
Westmere-EP	DP Server	2 (4)	LGA; 1366	Xeon	X5698	4.4 GHz	—N/a	No	130 W	2× QPI 6.4 GT/s	3× DDR3-1333	12 MB	Q1 2011	OEM
Westmere-EP	DP Server	6 (12)	LGA; 1366	Xeon	X5690	3.46 GHz	—N/a	Yes	130 W	2× QPI 6.4 GT/s	3× DDR3-1333	12 MB	2011-02-13	$1663
Westmere-EP	DP Server	6 (12)	LGA; 1366	Xeon	X5680	3.33 GHz	—N/a	Yes	130 W	2× QPI 6.4 GT/s	3× DDR3-1333	12 MB	2010-03-16	$1663
Westmere-EP	DP Server	6 (12)	LGA; 1366	Xeon	X5679	3.2 GHz	—N/a	Yes	115 W	2× QPI 6.4 GT/s	3× DDR3-1333	12 MB	2011-02-13	OEM
Westmere-EP	DP Server	6 (12)	LGA; 1366	Xeon	X5675	3.06 GHz	—N/a	Yes	95 W	2× QPI 6.4 GT/s	3× DDR3-1333	12 MB	2011-02-13	$1440
Westmere-EP	DP Server	6 (12)	LGA; 1366	Xeon	X5670	2.93 GHz	—N/a	Yes	95 W	2× QPI 6.4 GT/s	3× DDR3-1333	12 MB	2010-03-16	$1440
Westmere-EP	DP Server	6 (12)	LGA; 1366	Xeon	X5660	2.8 GHz	—N/a	Yes	95 W	2× QPI 6.4 GT/s	3× DDR3-1333	12 MB	2010-03-16	$1219
Westmere-EP	DP Server	6 (12)	LGA; 1366	Xeon	X5650	2.66 GHz	—N/a	Yes	95 W	2× QPI 6.4 GT/s	3× DDR3-1333	12 MB	2010-03-16	$996
Westmere-EP	DP Server	6 (12)	LGA; 1366	Xeon	E5649	2.53 GHz	—N/a	Yes	80 W	2× QPI 5.86 GT/s	3× DDR3-1333	12 MB	2011-02-13	$774
Westmere-EP	DP Server	6 (12)	LGA; 1366	Xeon	E5645	2.4 GHz	—N/a	Yes	80 W	2× QPI 5.86 GT/s	3× DDR3-1333	12 MB	2010-03-16	$551
Westmere-EP	DP Server	6 (12)	LGA; 1366	Xeon	L5645	2.4 GHz	—N/a	Yes	60 W	2× QPI 5.86 GT/s	3× DDR3-1333	12 MB	2011-02-13	OEM
Westmere-EP	DP Server	6 (12)	LGA; 1366	Xeon	L5640	2.26 GHz	—N/a	Yes	60 W	2× QPI 5.86 GT/s	3× DDR3-1333	12 MB	2010-03-16	$996
Westmere-EP	DP Server	6 (12)	LGA; 1366	Xeon	L5639	2.13 GHz	—N/a	Yes	60 W	2× QPI 5.86 GT/s	3× DDR3-1333	12 MB	2011-02-13	OEM
Westmere-EP	DP Server	6 (12)	LGA; 1366	Xeon	L5638	2.0 GHz	—N/a	Yes	60 W	2× QPI 5.86 GT/s	3× DDR3-1333	12 MB	2010-03-16	$958
Westmere-EP	DP Server	4 (8)	LGA; 1366	Xeon	X5687	3.6 GHz	—N/a	Yes	130 W	2× QPI 6.4 GT/s	3× DDR3-1333	12 MB	2011-02-13	$1663
Westmere-EP	DP Server	4 (8)	LGA; 1366	Xeon	X5677	3.46 GHz	—N/a	Yes	130 W	2× QPI 6.4 GT/s	3× DDR3-1333	12 MB	2010-03-16	$1663
Westmere-EP	DP Server	4 (8)	LGA; 1366	Xeon	X5672	3.2 GHz	—N/a	Yes	95 W	2× QPI 6.4 GT/s	3× DDR3-1333	12 MB	2011-02-13	$1440
Westmere-EP	DP Server	4 (8)	LGA; 1366	Xeon	X5667	3.06 GHz	—N/a	Yes	95 W	2× QPI 6.4 GT/s	3× DDR3-1333	12 MB	2010-03-16	$1440
Westmere-EP	DP Server	4 (8)	LGA; 1366	Xeon	X5647	2.93 GHz	—N/a	Yes	130 W	2× QPI 5.86 GT/s	3× DDR3-1066	12 MB	2011-02-13	$774
Westmere-EP	DP Server	4 (8)	LGA; 1366	Xeon	E5640	2.66 GHz	—N/a	Yes	80 W	2× QPI 5.86 GT/s	3× DDR3-1066	12 MB	2010-03-16	$774
Westmere-EP	DP Server	4 (8)	LGA; 1366	Xeon	E5630	2.53 GHz	—N/a	Yes	80 W	2× QPI 5.86 GT/s	3× DDR3-1066	12 MB	2010-03-16	$551
Westmere-EP	DP Server	4 (8)	LGA; 1366	Xeon	E5620	2.4 GHz	—N/a	Yes	80 W	2× QPI 5.86 GT/s	3× DDR3-1066	12 MB	2010-03-16	$387
Westmere-EP	DP Server	4 (8)	LGA; 1366	Xeon	L5630	2.13 GHz	—N/a	Yes	40 W	2× QPI 5.86 GT/s	3× DDR3-1066	12 MB	2010-03-16	$551
Westmere-EP	DP Server	4 (8)	LGA; 1366	Xeon	L5618	1.86 GHz	—N/a	Yes	40 W	2× QPI 5.86 GT/s	3× DDR3-1066	12 MB	2010-03-16	$530
Westmere-EP	DP Server	4 (4)	LGA; 1366	Xeon	L5609	1.86 GHz	—N/a	No	40 W	2× QPI 4.8 GT/s	3× DDR3-1066	12 MB	2010-03-16	$440
Westmere-EP	DP Server	4 (4)	LGA; 1366	Xeon	E5607	2.26 GHz	—N/a	No	80 W	2× QPI 4.8 GT/s	3× DDR3-1066	8 MB	2011-02-13	$276
Westmere-EP	DP Server	4 (4)	LGA; 1366	Xeon	E5606	2.13 GHz	—N/a	No	80 W	2× QPI 4.8 GT/s	3× DDR3-1066	8 MB	2011-02-13	$219
Westmere-EP	DP Server	4 (4)	LGA; 1366	Xeon	E5603	1.6 GHz	—N/a	No	80 W	2× QPI 4.8 GT/s	3× DDR3-1066	4 MB	2011-02-13	$188
Gulftown	UP Server	6 (12)	LGA; 1366	Xeon	W3690	3.46 GHz	—N/a	Yes	130 W	1× QPI 6.4 GT/s	3× DDR3-1333	12 MB	2011-02-13	$999
Gulftown	UP Server	6 (12)	LGA; 1366	Xeon	W3680	3.33 GHz	—N/a	Yes	130 W	1× QPI 6.4 GT/s	3× DDR3-1333	12 MB	2010-03-16	$999
Gulftown	UP Server	6 (12)	LGA; 1366	Xeon	W3670	3.20 GHz	—N/a	Yes	130 W	1× QPI 4.8 GT/s	3× DDR3-1066	12 MB	2010-08-29	$885
Gulftown	Extreme / Performance; Desktop	6 (12)	LGA; 1366	Core i7 Extreme	990X	3.46 GHz	—N/a	Yes	130 W	1× QPI 6.4 GT/s	3× DDR3-1066	12 MB	2011-02-13	$999
Gulftown	Extreme / Performance; Desktop	6 (12)	LGA; 1366	Core i7 Extreme	980X	3.33 GHz	—N/a	Yes	130 W	1× QPI 6.4 GT/s	3× DDR3-1066	12 MB	2010-03-16	$999
Gulftown	Extreme / Performance; Desktop	6 (12)	LGA; 1366	Core i7	980	3.33 GHz	—N/a	Yes	130 W	1× QPI 4.8 GT/s	3× DDR3-1066	12 MB	2011-06-26	$583
Gulftown	Extreme / Performance; Desktop	6 (12)	LGA; 1366	Core i7	970	3.20 GHz	—N/a	Yes	130 W	1× QPI 4.8 GT/s	3× DDR3-1066	12 MB	2010-07-17	$583
Clarkdale	UP Server	2 (4)	LGA; 1156	Xeon	L3406	2.26 GHz	—N/a	Yes	30 W	DMI	2× DDR3-1066	4 MB	2010-03-16	$189
Clarkdale	UP Server	2 (2)	LGA; 1156	Xeon	L3403	2.0 GHz	—N/a	Yes	30 W	DMI	2× DDR3-1066	4 MB	2010-10	OEM
Clarkdale	Mainstream / Value; Desktop	2 (4)	LGA; 1156	Core i5	680	3.6 GHz	733 MHz	Yes	73 W	DMI	2× DDR3-1333	4 MB	2010-04-18	$294
Clarkdale	Mainstream / Value; Desktop	2 (4)	LGA; 1156	Core i5	670	3.46 GHz	733 MHz	Yes	73 W	DMI	2× DDR3-1333	4 MB	2010-01-07	$284
Clarkdale	Mainstream / Value; Desktop	2 (4)	LGA; 1156	Core i5	661	3.33 GHz	900 MHz	Yes	87 W	DMI	2× DDR3-1333	4 MB	2010-01-07	$196
Clarkdale	Mainstream / Value; Desktop	2 (4)	LGA; 1156	Core i5	660	3.33 GHz	733 MHz	Yes	73 W	DMI	2× DDR3-1333	4 MB	2010-01-07	$196
Clarkdale	Mainstream / Value; Desktop	2 (4)	LGA; 1156	Core i5	655K	3.2 GHz	733 MHz	Yes	73 W	DMI	2× DDR3-1333	4 MB	2010-05-30	$216
Clarkdale	Mainstream / Value; Desktop	2 (4)	LGA; 1156	Core i5	650	3.2 GHz	733 MHz	Yes	73 W	DMI	2× DDR3-1333	4 MB	2010-01-07	$176
Clarkdale	Mainstream / Value; Desktop	2 (4)	LGA; 1156	Core i3	560	3.33 GHz	733 MHz	No	73 W	DMI	2× DDR3-1333	4 MB	2010-08-29	$138
Clarkdale	Mainstream / Value; Desktop	2 (4)	LGA; 1156	Core i3	550	3.20 GHz	733 MHz	No	73 W	DMI	2× DDR3-1333	4 MB	2010-05-30	$138
Clarkdale	Mainstream / Value; Desktop	2 (4)	LGA; 1156	Core i3	540	3.06 GHz	733 MHz	No	73 W	DMI	2× DDR3-1333	4 MB	2010-01-07	$133
Clarkdale	Mainstream / Value; Desktop	2 (4)	LGA; 1156	Core i3	530	2.93 GHz	733 MHz	No	73 W	DMI	2× DDR3-1333	4 MB	2010-01-07	$113
Clarkdale	Mainstream / Value; Desktop	2 (2)	LGA; 1156	Pentium	G6960	2.93 GHz	533 MHz	No	73 W	DMI	2× DDR3-1066	3 MB	2011-01-09	$89
Clarkdale	Mainstream / Value; Desktop	2 (2)	LGA; 1156	Pentium	G6951	2.8 GHz	533 MHz	No	73 W	DMI	2× DDR3-1066	3 MB	Q3 2010	OEM
Clarkdale	Mainstream / Value; Desktop	2 (2)	LGA; 1156	Pentium	G6950	2.8 GHz	533 MHz	No	73 W	DMI	2× DDR3-1066	3 MB	2010-01-07	$87
Clarkdale	Mainstream / Value; Desktop	2 (2)	LGA; 1156	Celeron	G1101	2.26 GHz	533 MHz	No	73 W	DMI	2× DDR3-1066	2 MB	2010-01-07	$70
Codename	Market	Cores / Threads	Socket	Processor Branding & model		Core	GPU	Turbo	TDP	Chipset	Memory	L3 cache	Release Date	Price
Codename	Market	Cores / Threads	Socket	Processor Branding & model		Clock rate		Turbo	TDP	Interfaces		L3 cache	Release Date	Price

=== Mobile processors ===
Codename	Market	Cores / threads	Processor branding & model		CPU Clock rate		GPU clock rate	Turbo	TDP	Memory	L3 cache	Interface	Release date	Price
Codename	Market	Cores / threads	Processor branding & model		Standard	Turbo (1C/2C active cores )	GPU clock rate	Turbo	TDP	Memory	L3 cache	Interface	Release date	Price
Arrandale	Mainstream / Value Mobile	2 (4)	Core i7	640M	2.8 GHz	3.46/3.2 GHz	766 MHz	Yes	35 W	2× DDR3-1066	4 MB	* DMI * PCIe 1 x16 * Socket: μPGA-988 / BGA-1288	2010-09-26	$346
Arrandale	Mainstream / Value Mobile	2 (4)	Core i7	620M	2.66 GHz	3.33/3.06 GHz	766 MHz	Yes	35 W	2× DDR3-1066	4 MB	* DMI * PCIe 1 x16 * Socket: μPGA-988 / BGA-1288	2010-01-07	$332
Arrandale	Mainstream / Value Mobile	2 (4)	Core i7	610E	2.53 GHz	3.2/2.93 GHz	766 MHz	Yes	35 W	2× DDR3-1066	4 MB	* DMI * PCIe 1 x16 * Socket: μPGA-988 / BGA-1288	2010-01-07	$332
Arrandale	Mainstream / Value Mobile	2 (4)	Core i7	660LM	2.26 GHz	3.06/2.8 GHz	566 MHz	Yes	25 W	2× DDR3-1066	4 MB	* DMI * PCIe 1 x16 * Socket: μPGA-988 / BGA-1288	2010-09-26	$346
Arrandale	Mainstream / Value Mobile	2 (4)	Core i7	640LM	2.13 GHz	2.93/2.66 GHz	566 MHz	Yes	25 W	2× DDR3-1066	4 MB	* DMI * PCIe 1 x16 * Socket: μPGA-988 / BGA-1288	2010-01-07	$332
Arrandale	Mainstream / Value Mobile	2 (4)	Core i7	620LM / 620LE	2.0 GHz	2.8/2.53 GHz	566 MHz	Yes	25 W	2× DDR3-1066	4 MB	* DMI * PCIe 1 x16 * Socket: μPGA-988 / BGA-1288	2010-01-07	$300
Arrandale	Mainstream / Value Mobile	2 (4)	Core i7	680UM	1.46 GHz	2.53/2.16 GHz	500 MHz	Yes	18 W	2× DDR3-800	4 MB	* DMI * PCIe 1 x16 * Socket: μPGA-988 / BGA-1288	2010-09-26	$317
Arrandale	Mainstream / Value Mobile	2 (4)	Core i7	660UM / 660UE	1.33 GHz	2.4/2.0 GHz	500 MHz	Yes	18 W	2× DDR3-800	4 MB	* DMI * PCIe 1 x16 * Socket: μPGA-988 / BGA-1288	2010-05-25	$317
Arrandale	Mainstream / Value Mobile	2 (4)	Core i7	640UM	1.2 GHz	2.26/1.86 GHz	500 MHz	Yes	18 W	2× DDR3-800	4 MB	* DMI * PCIe 1 x16 * Socket: μPGA-988 / BGA-1288	2010-01-07	$305
Arrandale	Mainstream / Value Mobile	2 (4)	Core i7	620UM / 620UE	1.06 GHz	2.13/1.76 GHz	500 MHz	Yes	18 W	2× DDR3-800	4 MB	* DMI * PCIe 1 x16 * Socket: μPGA-988 / BGA-1288	2010-01-07	$278
Arrandale	Mainstream / Value Mobile	2 (4)	Core i5	580M	2.66 GHz	3.33/2.93 GHz	766 MHz	Yes	35 W	2× DDR3-1066	3 MB	* DMI * PCIe 1 x16 * Socket: μPGA-988 / BGA-1288	2010-09-26	$266
Arrandale	Mainstream / Value Mobile	2 (4)	Core i5	560M	2.66 GHz	3.2/2.93 GHz	766 MHz	Yes	35 W	2× DDR3-1066	3 MB	* DMI * PCIe 1 x16 * Socket: μPGA-988 / BGA-1288	2010-09-26	$225
Arrandale	Mainstream / Value Mobile	2 (4)	Core i5	540M	2.53 GHz	3.06/2.8 GHz	766 MHz	Yes	35 W	2× DDR3-1066	3 MB	* DMI * PCIe 1 x16 * Socket: μPGA-988 / BGA-1288	2010-01-07	$257
Arrandale	Mainstream / Value Mobile	2 (4)	Core i5	520M / 520E	2.4 GHz	2.93/2.66 GHz	766 MHz	Yes	35 W	2× DDR3-1066	3 MB	* DMI * PCIe 1 x16 * Socket: μPGA-988 / BGA-1288	2010-01-07	$225
Arrandale	Mainstream / Value Mobile	2 (4)	Core i5	560UM	1.33 GHz	2.13/1.86 GHz	500 MHz	Yes	18 W	2× DDR3-800	3 MB	* DMI * PCIe 1 x16 * Socket: μPGA-988 / BGA-1288	2010-09-26	$250
Arrandale	Mainstream / Value Mobile	2 (4)	Core i5	540UM	1.2 GHz	2.0/1.73 GHz	500 MHz	Yes	18 W	2× DDR3-800	3 MB	* DMI * PCIe 1 x16 * Socket: μPGA-988 / BGA-1288	2010-05-25	$250
Arrandale	Mainstream / Value Mobile	2 (4)	Core i5	520UM	1.06 GHz	1.86/1.6 GHz	500 MHz	Yes	18 W	2× DDR3-800	3 MB	* DMI * PCIe 1 x16 * Socket: μPGA-988 / BGA-1288	2010-01-07	$241
Arrandale	Mainstream / Value Mobile	2 (4)	Core i5	480M	2.66 GHz	2.93/2.93 GHz	766 MHz	Yes	35 W	2× DDR3-1066	3 MB	* DMI * PCIe 1 x16 * Socket: μPGA-988 / BGA-1288	2011-01-09	OEM
Arrandale	Mainstream / Value Mobile	2 (4)	Core i5	460M	2.53 GHz	2.8/2.8 GHz	766 MHz	Yes	35 W	2× DDR3-1066	3 MB	* DMI * PCIe 1 x16 * Socket: μPGA-988 / BGA-1288	2010-09-26	OEM
Arrandale	Mainstream / Value Mobile	2 (4)	Core i5	450M	2.4 GHz	2.66/2.66 GHz	766 MHz	Yes	35 W	2× DDR3-1066	3 MB	* DMI * PCIe 1 x16 * Socket: μPGA-988 / BGA-1288	2010-06-26	OEM
Arrandale	Mainstream / Value Mobile	2 (4)	Core i5	430M	2.26 GHz	2.53/2.53 GHz	766 MHz	Yes	35 W	2× DDR3-1066	3 MB	* DMI * PCIe 1 x16 * Socket: μPGA-988 / BGA-1288	2010-01-07	OEM
Arrandale	Mainstream / Value Mobile	2 (4)	Core i5	470UM	1.33 GHz	1.86/1.6 GHz	500 MHz	Yes	18 W	2× DDR3-800	3 MB	* DMI * PCIe 1 x16 * Socket: μPGA-988 / BGA-1288	2010-10-01	OEM
Arrandale	Mainstream / Value Mobile	2 (4)	Core i5	430UM	1.2 GHz	1.73/1.46 GHz	500 MHz	Yes	18 W	2× DDR3-800	3 MB	* DMI * PCIe 1 x16 * Socket: μPGA-988 / BGA-1288	2010-05-25	OEM
Arrandale	Mainstream / Value Mobile	2 (4)	Core i3	390M	2.66 GHz	n/a	667 MHz	No	35 W	2× DDR3-1066	3 MB	* DMI * PCIe 1 x16 * Socket: μPGA-988 / BGA-1288	2011-01-09	OEM
Arrandale	Mainstream / Value Mobile	2 (4)	Core i3	380M	2.53 GHz	n/a	667 MHz	No	35 W	2× DDR3-1066	3 MB	* DMI * PCIe 1 x16 * Socket: μPGA-988 / BGA-1288	2010-09-26	OEM
Arrandale	Mainstream / Value Mobile	2 (4)	Core i3	370M	2.4 GHz	n/a	667 MHz	No	35 W	2× DDR3-1066	3 MB	* DMI * PCIe 1 x16 * Socket: μPGA-988 / BGA-1288	2010-06-20	OEM
Arrandale	Mainstream / Value Mobile	2 (4)	Core i3	350M	2.26 GHz	n/a	667 MHz	No	35 W	2× DDR3-1066	3 MB	* DMI * PCIe 1 x16 * Socket: μPGA-988 / BGA-1288	2010-01-07	OEM
Arrandale	Mainstream / Value Mobile	2 (4)	Core i3	330M / 330E	2.13 GHz	n/a	667 MHz	No	35 W	2× DDR3-1066	3 MB	* DMI * PCIe 1 x16 * Socket: μPGA-988 / BGA-1288	2010-01-07	OEM
Arrandale	Mainstream / Value Mobile	2 (4)	Core i3	380UM	1.33 GHz	n/a	500 MHz	No	18 W	2× DDR3-800	3 MB	* DMI * PCIe 1 x16 * Socket: μPGA-988 / BGA-1288	2010-10-01	OEM
Arrandale	Mainstream / Value Mobile	2 (4)	Core i3	330UM	1.2 GHz	n/a	500 MHz	No	18 W	2× DDR3-800	3 MB	* DMI * PCIe 1 x16 * Socket: μPGA-988 / BGA-1288	2010-05-25	OEM
Arrandale	Mainstream / Value Mobile	2 (2)	Pentium	P6300	2.26 GHz	n/a	667 MHz	No	35 W	2× DDR3-1066	3 MB	* DMI * PCIe 1 x16 * Socket: μPGA-988 / BGA-1288	2011-01-09	OEM
Arrandale	Mainstream / Value Mobile	2 (2)	Pentium	P6200	2.13 GHz	n/a	667 MHz	No	35 W	2× DDR3-1066	3 MB	* DMI * PCIe 1 x16 * Socket: μPGA-988 / BGA-1288	2010-09-26	OEM
Arrandale	Mainstream / Value Mobile	2 (2)	Pentium	P6100	2.0 GHz	n/a	667 MHz	No	35 W	2× DDR3-1066	3 MB	* DMI * PCIe 1 x16 * Socket: μPGA-988 / BGA-1288	2010-09-26	OEM
Arrandale	Mainstream / Value Mobile	2 (2)	Pentium	P6000	1.86 GHz	n/a	667 MHz	No	35 W	2× DDR3-1066	3 MB	* DMI * PCIe 1 x16 * Socket: μPGA-988 / BGA-1288	2010-06-20	OEM
Arrandale	Mainstream / Value Mobile	2 (2)	Pentium	U5600	1.33 GHz	n/a	500 MHz	No	18 W	2× DDR3-800	3 MB	* DMI * PCIe 1 x16 * Socket: μPGA-988 / BGA-1288	2011-01-09	OEM
Arrandale	Mainstream / Value Mobile	2 (2)	Pentium	U5400	1.2 GHz	n/a	500 MHz	No	18 W	2× DDR3-800	3 MB	* DMI * PCIe 1 x16 * Socket: μPGA-988 / BGA-1288	2010-05-25	OEM
Arrandale	Mainstream / Value Mobile	2 (2)	Celeron	P4600	2.0 GHz	n/a	667 MHz	No	35 W	2× DDR3-1066	2 MB	* DMI * PCIe 1 x16 * Socket: μPGA-988 / BGA-1288	2010-09-26	$86
Arrandale	Mainstream / Value Mobile	2 (2)	Celeron	P4500 / P4505	1.86 GHz	n/a	667 MHz	No	35 W	2× DDR3-1066	2 MB	* DMI * PCIe 1 x16 * Socket: μPGA-988 / BGA-1288	2010-03-28	OEM
Arrandale	Mainstream / Value Mobile	2 (2)	Celeron	U3600	1.2 GHz	n/a	500 MHz	No	18 W	2× DDR3-800	2 MB	* DMI * PCIe 1 x16 * Socket: μPGA-988 / BGA-1288	2011-01-09	$134
Arrandale	Mainstream / Value Mobile	2 (2)	Celeron	U3400 / U3405	1.06 GHz	n/a	500 MHz	No	18 W	2× DDR3-800 / 1066	2 MB	* DMI * PCIe 1 x16 * Socket: μPGA-988 / BGA-1288	2010-05-25	OEM

== Roadmap ==
The successor to Nehalem and Westmere is Sandy Bridge.

Atom (ULV)		Node name	Pentium/Core						
Microarch.	Step	Node name	Microarch.	Step					
		600 nm	P6	Pentium Pro (133 MHz)					
		500 nm	P6	Pentium Pro (150 MHz)					
		350 nm	P6	Pentium Pro (166–200 MHz)					
		350 nm	P6	Klamath					
		250 nm	P6	Deschutes					
		250 nm	P6	Katmai	NetBurst				
		180 nm	P6	Coppermine	Willamette				
		130 nm	P6	Tualatin	Northwood				
		130 nm	Pentium M (P6)	Banias	Northwood		NetBurst(HT)		NetBurst(×2)
		90 nm	Pentium M (P6)	Dothan	Prescott	⇨	Prescott‑2M	⇨	Smithfield
		90 nm	Pentium M (P6)	Dothan	~~Tejas~~	→	⇩	→	~~Cedarmill (Tejas)~~
		65 nm	Pentium M (P6)	Yonah	~~Nehalem (NetBurst)~~		Cedar Mill	⇨	Presler
		65 nm	Core	Merom	4 cores on mainstream desktop, DDR3 introduced				
Bonnell	Bonnell	45 nm	Core	Penryn					
Bonnell	Bonnell	45 nm	Nehalem	Nehalem	HT reintroduced, integrated MC, PCH; L3-cache introduced, 256 KB L2-cache/core				
Bonnell	Saltwell	32 nm	Nehalem	Westmere	Introduced GPU on same package and AES-NI				
Bonnell	Saltwell	32 nm	Sandy Bridge	Sandy Bridge	On-die ring bus, no more non-UEFI motherboards				
Silvermont	Silvermont	22 nm	Sandy Bridge	Ivy Bridge					
Silvermont	Silvermont	22 nm	Haswell	Haswell	Fully integrated voltage regulator				
Silvermont	Airmont	14 nm	Haswell	Broadwell					
Silvermont	Airmont	14 nm	Skylake	Skylake	DDR4 introduced on mainstream desktop				
Goldmont		14 nm	Skylake	Kaby Lake					
Goldmont		14 nm	Skylake	Coffee Lake	6 cores on mainstream desktop				
Goldmont		14 nm	Skylake	Amber Lake	Mobile-only				
Goldmont Plus		14 nm	Skylake	Whiskey Lake	Mobile-only				
Goldmont Plus		14 nm	Skylake	Coffee Lake Refresh	8 cores on mainstream desktop				
Goldmont Plus		14 nm	Skylake	Comet Lake	10 cores on mainstream desktop				
Goldmont Plus		14 nm	Sunny Cove	Cypress Cove (Rocket Lake)	Backported Sunny Cove microarchitecture for 14 nm				
Tremont		10 nm	Skylake	Palm Cove (Cannon Lake)	Mobile-only				
Tremont		10 nm	Sunny Cove	Sunny Cove (Ice Lake)	512 KB L2-cache/core				
Tremont		10 nm	Sunny Cove	Willow Cove (Tiger Lake)	X^{e} graphics engine				
Gracemont		Intel 7 (10 nm ESF)	Golden Cove	Golden Cove (Alder Lake)	Hybrid, DDR5, PCIe 5.0				
Gracemont		Intel 7 (10 nm ESF)	Golden Cove	Raptor Cove (Raptor Lake)					
Crestmont		Intel 4	Redwood Cove	Meteor Lake	Mobile-only; NPU, chiplet architecture				
Crestmont		Intel 3	Redwood Cove	Arrow Lake-U					
Skymont		TSMC N3B	Lion Cove	Lunar Lake	Low power mobile only (9–30 W)				
Skymont		TSMC N3B	Lion Cove	Arrow Lake					
Darkmont		Intel 18A	Cougar Cove	Panther Lake					
Arctic Wolf		Intel 18A and/or TSMC N2P	Coyote Cove	Nova Lake					

== See also ==
- List of Intel CPU microarchitectures
- Tick-Tock model

Atom (ULV)		Node name	Pentium/Core						
Microarch.	Step	Node name	Microarch.	Step					
		600 nm	P6	Pentium Pro (133 MHz)					
		500 nm	P6	Pentium Pro (150 MHz)					
		350 nm	P6	Pentium Pro (166–200 MHz)					
		350 nm	P6	Klamath					
		250 nm	P6	Deschutes					
		250 nm	P6	Katmai	NetBurst				
		180 nm	P6	Coppermine	Willamette				
		130 nm	P6	Tualatin	Northwood				
		130 nm	Pentium M (P6)	Banias	Northwood		NetBurst(HT)		NetBurst(×2)
		90 nm	Pentium M (P6)	Dothan	Prescott	⇨	Prescott‑2M	⇨	Smithfield
		90 nm	Pentium M (P6)	Dothan	~~Tejas~~	→	⇩	→	~~Cedarmill (Tejas)~~
		65 nm	Pentium M (P6)	Yonah	~~Nehalem (NetBurst)~~		Cedar Mill	⇨	Presler
		65 nm	Core	Merom	4 cores on mainstream desktop, DDR3 introduced				
Bonnell	Bonnell	45 nm	Core	Penryn					
Bonnell	Bonnell	45 nm	Nehalem	Nehalem	HT reintroduced, integrated MC, PCH; L3-cache introduced, 256 KB L2-cache/core				
Bonnell	Saltwell	32 nm	Nehalem	Westmere	Introduced GPU on same package and AES-NI				
Bonnell	Saltwell	32 nm	Sandy Bridge	Sandy Bridge	On-die ring bus, no more non-UEFI motherboards				
Silvermont	Silvermont	22 nm	Sandy Bridge	Ivy Bridge					
Silvermont	Silvermont	22 nm	Haswell	Haswell	Fully integrated voltage regulator				
Silvermont	Airmont	14 nm	Haswell	Broadwell					
Silvermont	Airmont	14 nm	Skylake	Skylake	DDR4 introduced on mainstream desktop				
Goldmont		14 nm	Skylake	Kaby Lake					
Goldmont		14 nm	Skylake	Coffee Lake	6 cores on mainstream desktop				
Goldmont		14 nm	Skylake	Amber Lake	Mobile-only				
Goldmont Plus		14 nm	Skylake	Whiskey Lake	Mobile-only				
Goldmont Plus		14 nm	Skylake	Coffee Lake Refresh	8 cores on mainstream desktop				
Goldmont Plus		14 nm	Skylake	Comet Lake	10 cores on mainstream desktop				
Goldmont Plus		14 nm	Sunny Cove	Cypress Cove (Rocket Lake)	Backported Sunny Cove microarchitecture for 14 nm				
Tremont		10 nm	Skylake	Palm Cove (Cannon Lake)	Mobile-only				
Tremont		10 nm	Sunny Cove	Sunny Cove (Ice Lake)	512 KB L2-cache/core				
Tremont		10 nm	Sunny Cove	Willow Cove (Tiger Lake)	X^{e} graphics engine				
Gracemont		Intel 7 (10 nm ESF)	Golden Cove	Golden Cove (Alder Lake)	Hybrid, DDR5, PCIe 5.0				
Gracemont		Intel 7 (10 nm ESF)	Golden Cove	Raptor Cove (Raptor Lake)					
Crestmont		Intel 4	Redwood Cove	Meteor Lake	Mobile-only; NPU, chiplet architecture				
Crestmont		Intel 3	Redwood Cove	Arrow Lake-U					
Skymont		TSMC N3B	Lion Cove	Lunar Lake	Low power mobile only (9–30 W)				
Skymont		TSMC N3B	Lion Cove	Arrow Lake					
Darkmont		Intel 18A	Cougar Cove	Panther Lake					
Arctic Wolf		Intel 18A and/or TSMC N2P	Coyote Cove	Nova Lake					
