= Intel Core 2 =

Processor family

Core 2
- Intel Core 2 Duo logo from 2009 to 2012

General information
- Launched: July 26, 2006
- Discontinued: June 8, 2012
- Marketed by: Intel
- Designed by: Intel
- Common manufacturer: Intel

Performance
- Max. CPU clock rate: 1.06 GHz to 3.5 GHz
- FSB speeds: 533 MT/s to 1.6 GT/s
- Data width: 64 bits
- Address width: 36 bits
- Virtual address width: 48 bits

Physical specifications
- Transistors: 291 million to 820 million
- Cores: 1, 2, or 4
- Packages: Flip-chip land grid array (FC-LGA); Micro pin grid array (mPGA); Flip-chip ball grid array (FC-BGA)
- Sockets: Socket T (LGA 775); Socket M (μPGA 478MT); Socket P (μPGA 478MN); Micro-FCBGA (μBGA 479); Micro-FCBGA (μBGA 965)

Cache
- L1 cache: 64 KB per core (32 KB data + 32 KB instructions)
- L2 cache: Up to 12 MB

Architecture and classification
- Application: Desktop; Mobile
- Technology node: 65 nm to 45 nm
- Microarchitecture: Core: Merom (65 nm); Penryn (45 nm)
- Instruction set: x86-64
- Instructions: MMX, SSE, SSE2, SSE3, SSSE3, SSE4.1

Products, models, variants
- Core names: Desktop: Allendale, Conroe, Kentsfield, Wolfdale, Yorkfield, Mobile: Merom, Penryn, Penryn QC
- Product code names: C2S; C2D; C2E; C2Q; C2QX
- Models: Core 2 Solo; Core 2 Duo; Core 2 Quad; Core 2 Extreme
- Variant: Pentium Dual-Core

History
- Predecessors: Pentium D (desktop); Intel Core Solo/Duo (mobile)
- Successor: Core i3/i5/i7

Support status
- Unsupported

Intel Core 2 is a processor family encompassing a range of Intel's mainstream 64-bit x86-64 single-, dual-, and quad-core microprocessors based on the Core microarchitecture. The single- and dual-core models are single-die, whereas the quad-core models comprise two dies, each containing two cores, packaged in a multi-chip module. The Core 2 range is the last flagship range of Intel desktop processors to use a front-side bus (FSB).

The introduction of Core 2 relegated the Pentium brand to the mid-range market, and reunified laptop and desktop CPU lines for marketing purposes under the same product name, which were formerly divided into the Pentium 4, Pentium D, and Core Solo/Duo brands.

The Core 2 processor line was introduced on July 27, 2006, comprising the Duo (dual-core) and Extreme (dual- or quad-core CPUs for enthusiasts), and in 2007, the Quad (quad-core) and Solo (single-core) sub-brands. Intel Core 2 processors with vPro technology (designed for businesses) include the dual-core and quad-core branches.

Although Woodcrest processors are also based on the Core 2 architecture, they are available under the Xeon brand. From December 2006, all Core 2 processors were manufactured from 300-millimeter plates at Fab 12 factory in Arizona and at Fab 24-2 in County Kildare, Ireland.

== Virtual machine or virtualization abilities ==
Core 2 and other LGA 775 processors can support virtualization if the virtual machine (VM) software supports those processors, e.g. if the processor supports VT-x.

Newer versions of VM software do not support processors older than Nehalem (Core 2 and older), as they lack support for VT-x with Extended Page Tables (EPT), also called Second Level Address Translation (SLAT).

== Models ==
The Core 2-branded CPUs include: Conroe/Allendale (dual-core for desktops), Merom (dual-core for laptops), Merom-L (single-core for laptops), Kentsfield (quad-core for desktops), and the updated variants named Wolfdale (dual-core for desktops), Penryn (dual-core for laptops), Penryn-QC (quad-core for laptops), and Yorkfield (quad-core for desktops). (Note: For the server and workstation Woodcrest, "Clovertown", Tigerton, "Wolfdale-DP", Harpertown, and Dunnington CPUs, see the Xeon brand.)

The Core 2-branded processors feature Virtualization Technology without extended page tables (EPT) (with some exceptions), the NX bit and SSE3. The Merom microarchitecture introduced SSSE3, Trusted Execution Technology, Enhanced SpeedStep and Active Management Technology 2.0 (iAMT2). The Penryn microarchitecture, a shrink of the former, introduced SSE4.1. With a maximum thermal design power (TDP) of 65 W, the Core 2 Duo Conroe dissipates half the power of the less capable contemporary Pentium D-branded desktop chips that have a max TDP of 130 W.

Intel Core 2 processor family
| Original logo | 2009 logo | Desktop | | | Mobile | | |
| Original logo | 2009 logo | Code-name | Cores | Release date | Code-name | Cores | Release date |
|---|---|---|---|---|---|---|---|
| Core 2 Solo brand logo | Core 2 Solo logo as of 2009 | Desktop version not available | | | Merom-L; Penryn-L | Single (65 nm); Single (45 nm) | September 2007; May 2008 |
| Core 2 Duo logo | Core 2 Duo logo as of 2009 | Conroe; Allendale; Wolfdale | Dual (65 nm); Dual (65 nm); Dual (45 nm) | July 2006; January 2007; January 2008 | Merom; Penryn | Dual (65 nm); Dual (45 nm) | August 2006; January 2008 |
| Core 2 Quad logo | Core 2 Quad logo as of 2009 | Kentsfield; Yorkfield | Quad (65 nm); Quad (45 nm) | January 2007; March 2008 | Penryn-QC | Quad (45 nm) | August 2008 |
| Core 2 Extreme logo | Core 2 Extreme logo as of 2009 | Conroe XE; Kentsfield XE; Yorkfield XE | Dual (65 nm); Quad (65 nm); Quad (45 nm) | July 2006; November 2006; November 2007 | Merom XE; Penryn XE; Penryn-QC XE | Dual (65 nm); Dual (45 nm); Quad (45 nm) | July 2007; January 2008; August 2008 |
| Full list | | List of desktop processors | | | List of mobile processors | | |

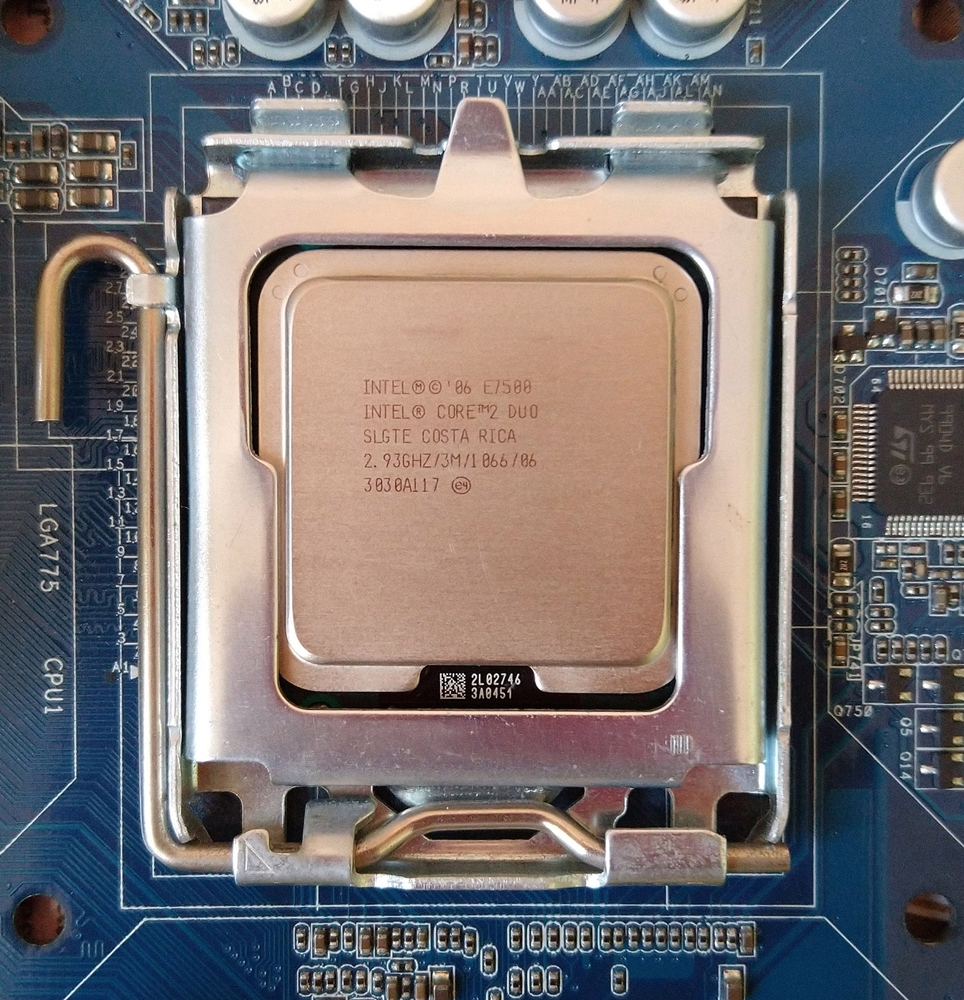
An Intel Core 2 Duo E7500 "Wolfdale-3M"

== Successors ==
The successors to the Core 2 brand are a set of Nehalem-based processors called Core i3, i5, and i7. The Core i7 was officially launched on November 17, 2008, as a family of three quad-core processor high-end desktop models; further models started appearing throughout 2009. The last processor of the family to be released was the Core 2 Quad Q9500 in January 2010. The Core 2 processor line was removed from the official price lists in July 2011, and the last processors were discontinued in June 2012.

== Compatibility issues with modern operating systems ==
As of 2025, a handful of Linux distributions will not run on Intel Core 2-series CPUs due to them requiring the x86-64-v2 microarchitecture level, which is not fully supported by any of the Core 2-series CPUs. Examples include Red Hat Enterprise Linux 9 as well as openSUSE Tumbleweed. Attempting to run these distributions on a Core 2 CPU will result in an error message or crash during the boot process.

Windows 11 releases, starting with version 24H2, will also not run on Intel Core 2 CPUs as it requires the SSE4.2 and POPCNT instruction sets, neither of which are supported by Core 2 CPUs.

== See also ==
- Pentium Dual-Core
- Comparison of Intel processors
- List of Intel Core 2 processors

== Notes ==
Preceded by Pentium D (desktop)
| Preceded by Core Solo/Duo (mobile) | Intel Core 2; 2006–2011 | Succeeded by Core i |
