= Penryn (microprocessor) =

Mobile processor from Intel

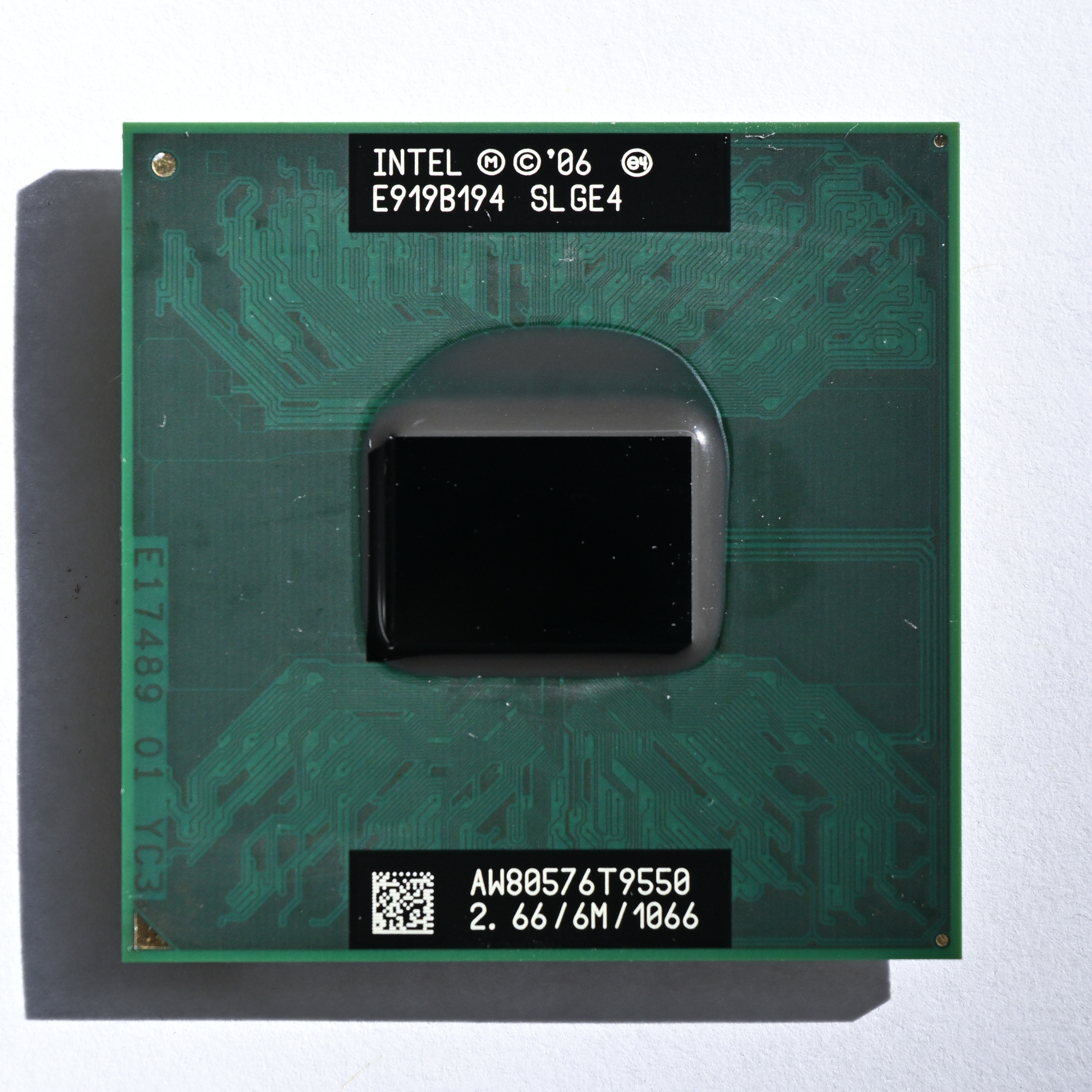
- Mobile Core 2 Duo T9550 with a 2.66 GHz clock speed, 6 MB of L2 cache, and a 1.07 GT/s FSB

General information
- Launched: 2007
- Discontinued: 2011
- Marketed by: Intel
- Designed by: Intel
- Common manufacturer: Intel
- CPUID code: 1067x
- Product code: Penryn: 80576; Penryn-3M: 80577; Penryn-L: 80585; Penryn-QC: 80581

Performance
- Max. CPU clock rate: 1.2 GHz to 3.06 GHz
- FSB speeds: 800 MT/s to 1.07 GT/s

Physical specifications
- Cores: 2 (Penryn-QC: 4)
- Package: FCBGA478
- Socket: Socket P

Cache
- L1 cache: 32 KB instruction, 32 KB data per core
- L2 cache: Penryn: 6 MB; Penryn-3M: 3 MB; Penryn-L: 3 MB; Penryn-QC: 12 MB

Architecture and classification
- Application: Mobile
- Technology node: 45 nm
- Microarchitecture: Penryn
- Instruction set: x86, x86-64

Products, models, variants
- Brand names: Celeron 7xx, and 9xx; Celeron E3xxx, SU2xxx; Pentium T4xxx, SU4xxx, and SU2xxx; Core 2 Solo SU3xxx; Core 2 Duo P7xxx, P8xxx, and P9xxx; Core 2 Duo T6xxx, T7xxx, T8xxx, and T9xxx; Core 2 Duo SP9xxx, SL9xxx, SU7xxx, and SU9xxx; Core 2 Quad Q9xxx; Core 2 Extreme QX9300

History
- Predecessor: Merom
- Successors: Clarksfield (quad-core and extreme mobile); Arrandale (dual-core mobile)

Support status
- Unsupported

Penryn is the code name of a mobile processor from Intel that is sold in varying configurations such as Core 2 Solo, Core 2 Duo, Core 2 Quad, Pentium and Celeron.

During development, Penryn was the Intel code name for the 2007/2008 "Tick" of Intel's Tick-Tock cycle which shrunk Merom to 45 nanometers as CPUID model 23. The term "Penryn" is sometimes used to refer to all 45 nm chips with the Core architecture.

Chips with Penryn architecture come in two sizes, with 6 MB and 3 MB L2 cache.

Low power versions of Penryn are known as the Penryn-L; these are single-core processors. The Penryn-QC quad-cores are made from two chips with two cores and 6 MB of cache per chip.

The desktop version of Penryn is Wolfdale and the dual-socket server version is Wolfdale-DP. Penryn-QC is related to Yorkfield on the desktop and Harpertown in servers. The MP server Dunnington chip is a more distant relative based on a different chip but using the same 45 nm Core microarchitecture.

Penryn was replaced by the Nehalem-based Arrandale (dual core) and Clarksfield (quad core).

== Variants ==
Processor	Brand name	Model (list)	Cores	L2 Cache	Socket	TDP
Penryn-L	Core 2 Solo	SU3xxx	1	3 MB	BGA956	5.5 W
Penryn-3M	Core 2 Duo	SU7xxx	2	3 MB	BGA956	10 W
Penryn-3M	Core 2 Duo	SU9xxx	2	3 MB	BGA956	10 W
Penryn	Core 2 Duo	SL9xxx	2	6 MB	BGA956	17 W
Penryn	Core 2 Duo	SP9xxx	2	6 MB	BGA956	25 W
Penryn-3M	Core 2 Duo	P7xxx	2	3 MB	Socket P FCBGA6	25/28 W
Penryn-3M	Core 2 Duo	P8xxx	2	3 MB	Socket P FCBGA6	25/28 W
Penryn	Core 2 Duo	P9xxx	2	6 MB	Socket P FCBGA6	25/28 W
Penryn-3M	Core 2 Duo	T6xxx	2	2 MB	Socket P FCBGA6	35 W
Penryn-3M	Core 2 Duo	T8xxx	2	3 MB	Socket P FCBGA6	35 W
Penryn	Core 2 Duo	T9xxx	2	6 MB	Socket P FCBGA6	35 W
Penryn	Core 2 Duo	E8x35	2	6 MB	Socket P	35-55 W
Penryn-QC	Core 2 Quad	Q9xxx	4	2x3-2x6 MB	Socket P	45 W
Penryn XE	Core 2 Extreme	X9xxx	2	6 MB	Socket P	44 W
Penryn-QC	Core 2 Extreme	QX9300	4	2x6 MB	Socket P	45 W
Penryn-3M	Celeron	T3xxx	2	1 MB	Socket P	35 W
Penryn-3M	Celeron	SU2xxx	2	1 MB	μFC-BGA 956	10 W
Penryn-L	Celeron	9xx	1	1 MB	Socket P	35 W
Penryn-L	Celeron	7x3	1	1 MB	μFC-BGA 956	10 W
Penryn-3M	Pentium	T4xxx	2	1 MB	Socket P	35 W
Penryn-3M	Pentium	SU4xxx	2	2 MB	μFC-BGA 956	10 W
Penryn-L	Pentium	SU2xxx	1	2 MB	μFC-BGA 956	5.5 W

=== Penryn ===
The successor to the Merom core for the Core 2 Duo T5000/T7000 series mobile processors, code-named Penryn, debuted on the 45 nanometer process. Many details about Penryn appeared at the April 2007 Intel Developer Forum. Intel's new 45 nm Penryn-based Core 2 Duo and Core 2 Extreme processors were released on January 6, 2008. The new processors launched exclusively with a TDP of 35 W; later releases were more energy efficient. HP began to offer the first model, the T9500, from late January 2008. The T9500 offered a 2.6 GHz clock rate, higher than all but the Extreme Edition of the Merom range, and 6 MB (rather than 4 MB) of Level 2 Cache.

Important advances included the addition of new instructions including SSE4 (also known as Penryn New Instructions) and new fabrication materials; most significantly a hafnium-based high-κ dielectric.

All SL9xxx, SP9xxx, P9xxx, T9xxx and X9xxx processors are Penryn with the full 6 MB L2 cache enabled, while P7xxx, P8xxx and T8xxx can be either Penryn-3M or Penryn with only 3 MB cache enabled. They are indistinguishable by software, but Penryn uses product code 80576.

Intel released an Apple-only Exxx chip on April 28, 2008 that increased the clock rate to 3.06 GHz as well as increasing the Front Side Bus to 1066 MT/s, and changed the Cache to 6 MB shared L2. While it is used in desktop computers and has an E8xxx name, it uses the same packaging as mobile CPUs and is therefore considered a Penryn and not Wolfdale.

On desktops, Penryn pairs with the 2007 desktop Bearlake chipset series, some of whose models include an increase in bus performance (connection to the northbridge, etc.) to 1333 MT/s and support for DDR3 SDRAM. In notebooks and other mobile equipment, Penryn initially paired with the mobile Crestline chipset series which supports DDR2 but not DDR3, (although when Penryn was released, Intel believed future DDR3 support would benefit mobile equipment's power- and heat-constrained environments). Mobile Penryns were later paired with the Cantiga chipset series which (among other enhancements) added DDR3 support.

=== Penryn-3M ===
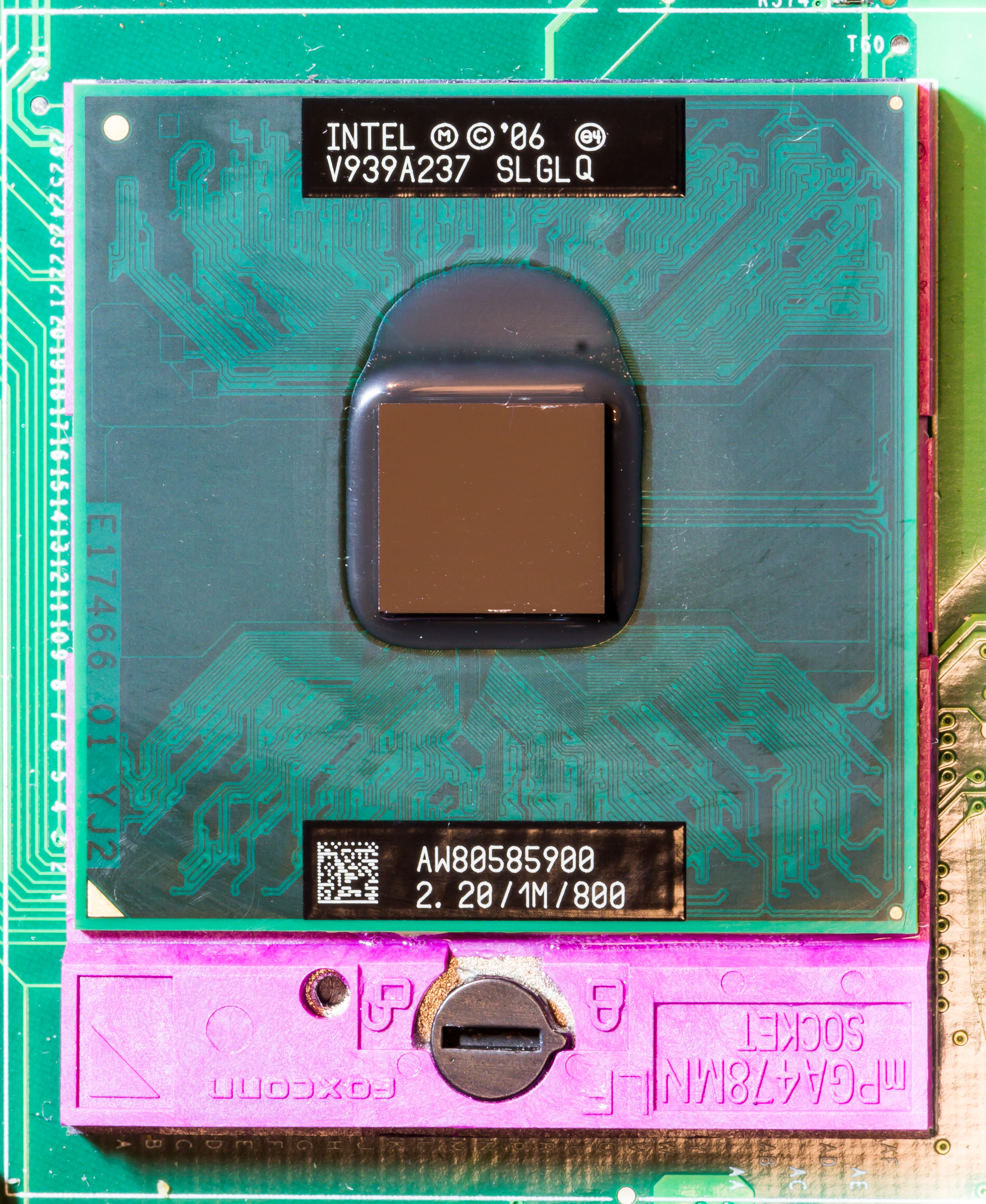
Celeron 900

The smaller (82 mm^{2} instead of 107 mm^{2}) Penryn-3M is used in mobile processors with an L2 Cache 3 MB or less as a successor to Merom-2M. Its product code is 80577. The entry level Penryn-3M Core 2 processor is the T6xxx series, with 2 MB L2 Cache and begins with the T6400 at a clock rate of 2 GHz. Other Penryn-3M based processor series are Celeron T3xxx, Pentium T4xxx, as well as most Core 2 Duo SU9xxx, P7xxx, P8xxx, T8xxx processors.

In September 2009, Intel introduced new Consumer Ultra-Low Voltage processors based on Penryn-3M, as Celeron SU2xxx series, Pentium SU4xxx series and Core 2 Duo SU7xxx series, with 1, 2 and 3 MB of active L2 cache. Like the earlier Core 2 Duo SU9xxx series, they are always soldered on using a BGA956 package and have a TDP of only 10 W.

=== Penryn-L ===
Penryn-L does not actually seem to be a separate chip but only a version of Penryn-3M with a single core enabled. However, it has a separate product code of 80585. Penryn-L is used in the ultra-low voltage Core 2 SU3xxx, the standard voltage Celeron 9xx and the CULV Celeron 7xx and Pentium SU2xxx series. The Celeron versions have only 1 MB active L2 cache, Pentium versions have 2 MB.

=== Penryn-QC ===
In August 2008 Intel released their first two quad-core processors for notebooks, the Core 2 Quad Q9100 and Core 2 Extreme QX9300. As these require more power (45 W) and cooling than other Penryn processors they are not automatically compatible with all Centrino 2 notebooks. Also the Extreme version requires the GS45/GM45/PM45 chipset.

== Fixes ==
Microsoft has released a microcode update (KB2493989) for Windows 7 that addresses several stability issues on selected "Penryn" and "Merom" CPUs.

== See also ==
- Core (microarchitecture)
- Merom (microprocessor)
- Wolfdale (microprocessor)
- Clarksfield (microprocessor)
- Celeron
- Pentium Dual-Core
- Intel Core 2
- List of Macintosh models grouped by CPU type
