= Socket P =

Intel CPU socket

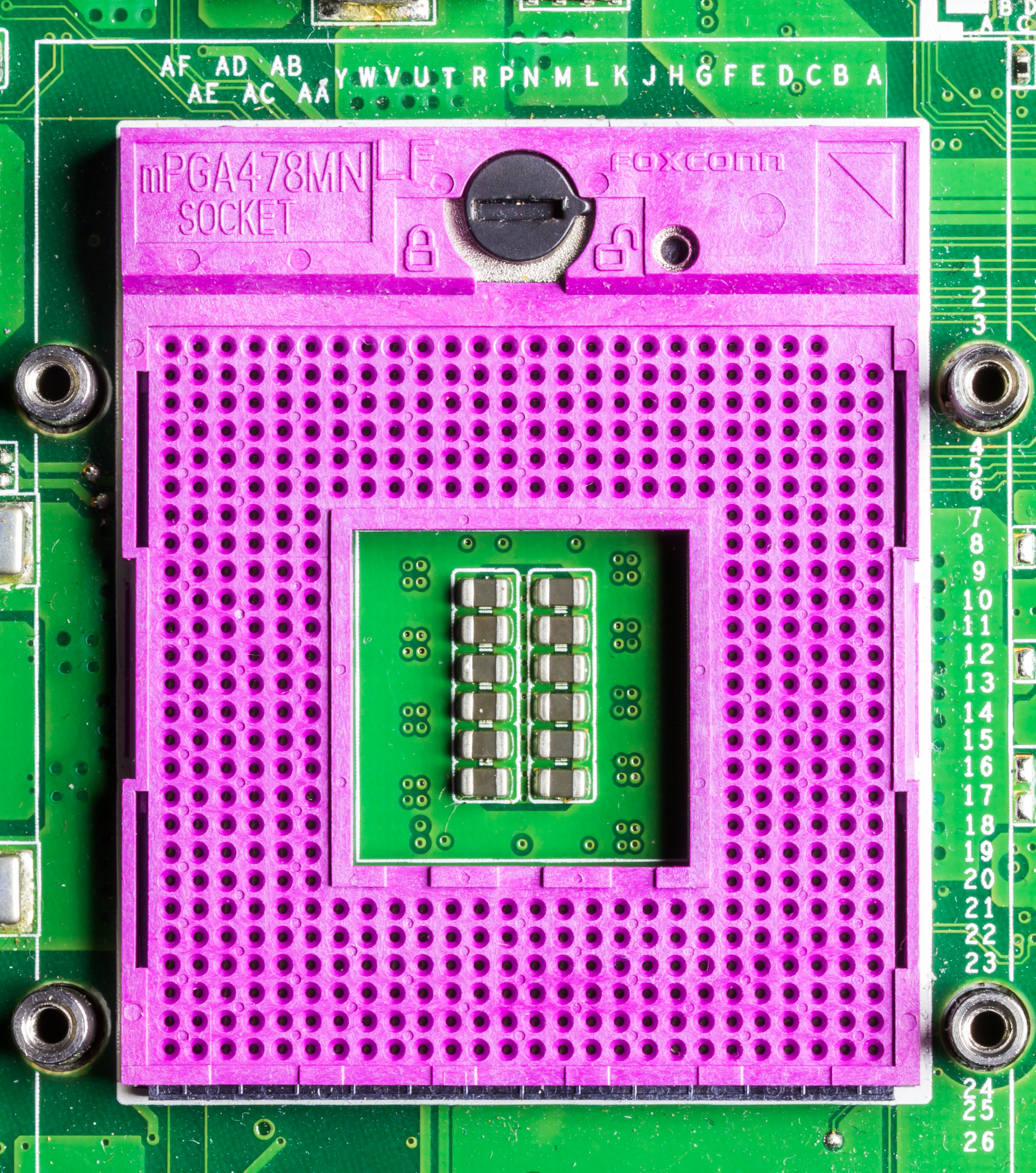
- Type: PGA
- Chip form factors: Flip-chip pin grid array
- Contacts: 478 (not to be confused with the older Socket 478 or the similar Socket 479 and Socket M)
- FSB frequency: 400 MT/s, 533 MT/s, 667 MT/s, 800 MT/s, 1066 MT/s
- Processor dimensions: 35 mm × 35 mm Intel Core 2 Duo T5xx0*, T6xx0, T7xx0*, T8x00, T9xx0, P7xx0, P8xx0, P9xx0 ) * some use socket M--see List of Intel Core 2 microprocessors#Dual-Core Notebook processors Intel Core 2 Quad Q9x00 Intel Core 2 Extreme X7x00, X9x00, QX9300 Intel Pentium Dual-Core T23x0, T2410, T3x00, T4x00 Intel Celeron M
- Predecessor: Socket M
- Successor: rPGA 988A
- This article is part of the CPU socket series

Socket P (mPGA478MN) is a CPU socket used by Intel as the mobile processor socket replacement for Core microarchitecture chips such as Core 2 Duo. It was introduced on May 9, 2007, as part of the Santa Rosa platform with the Merom and Penryn processors.

== Technical specifications ==
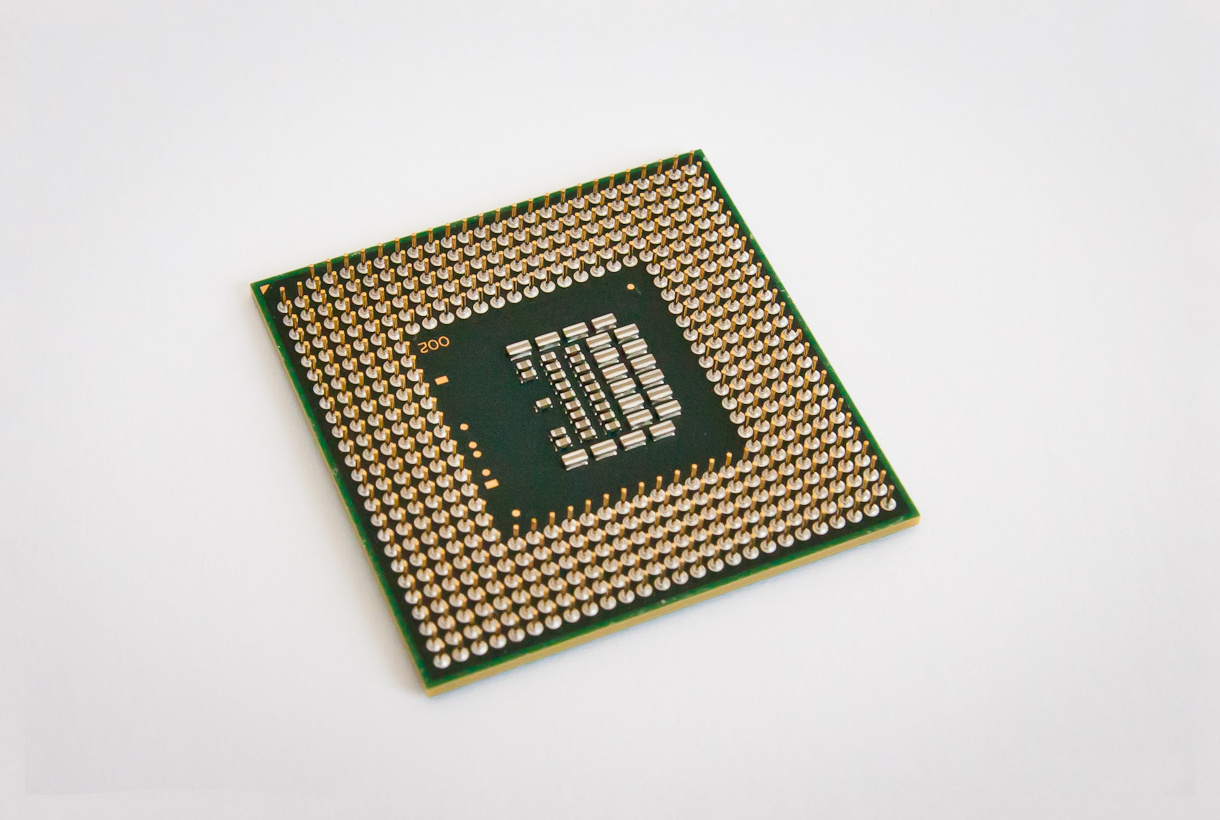
Intel Core 2 Duo T9600 CPU for Socket P, showing its underside

The front-side bus (FSB) of CPUs that install in Socket P can run at 400, 533, 667, 800, or 1066 MT/s. By adapting the multiplier the frequency of the CPU can throttle up or down to save power, given that all Socket P CPUs support EIST, except for Celeron that do not support EIST.

Socket P has 478 pins, but is not pin-compatible with Socket 479 and Socket M (by the location of one pin) and is electrically incompatible with Socket 478.

Socket P is also known as a 478-pin Micro-FCPGA or μFCPGA-478. On the plastic grid is printed as mPGA478MN.

== See also ==
- List of Intel microprocessors
- Micro-FCBGA
