= Socket M =

Intel CPU interface

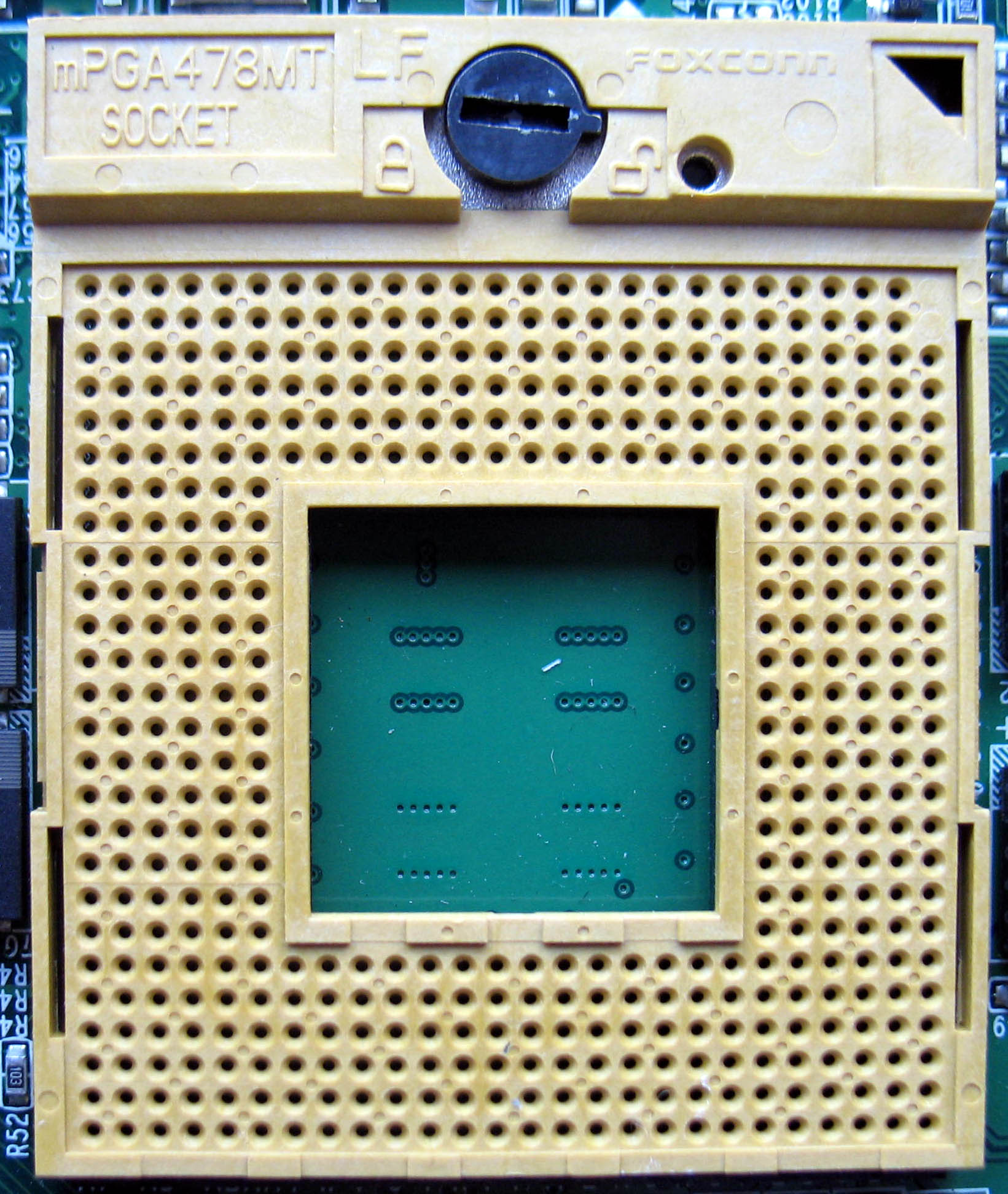
- Type: PGA-ZIF
- Chip form factors: Flip-chip pin grid array
- Contacts: 478 (not to be confused with the older Socket 478 or the similar Socket 479)
- FSB frequency: 533 MT/s, 667 MT/s, 800 MT/s
- Processors: Intel Core Solo T1200, T1250, T1300, T1350, T1400, T1500 Intel Core Duo T2050, T2250, T2300, T2300E, T2330, T2350, T2400, T2450, T2500, T2600, T2700 Intel Core 2 Duo T5200, T5300, T5500, T5600, T7200, T7400, T7600, T7600G Intel Pentium Dual-Core T2060, T2080, T2130 Intel Celeron M Intel Celeron 1.66 GHz
- Predecessor: Socket 479
- Successor: Socket P
- This article is part of the CPU socket series

Socket M (mPGA478MT) is a CPU socket introduced by Intel in 2006. It was used in all Intel Core products, as well as the Core-derived Dual-Core Xeon codenamed Sossaman. It was also used in the first generation of the mobile version of Intel's Core 2 Duo, specifically, the T5x00 and T7x00 Merom lines (referred to as Napa Refresh), though that line switched to Socket P (Santa Rosa) in 2007.

== Technical specifications ==
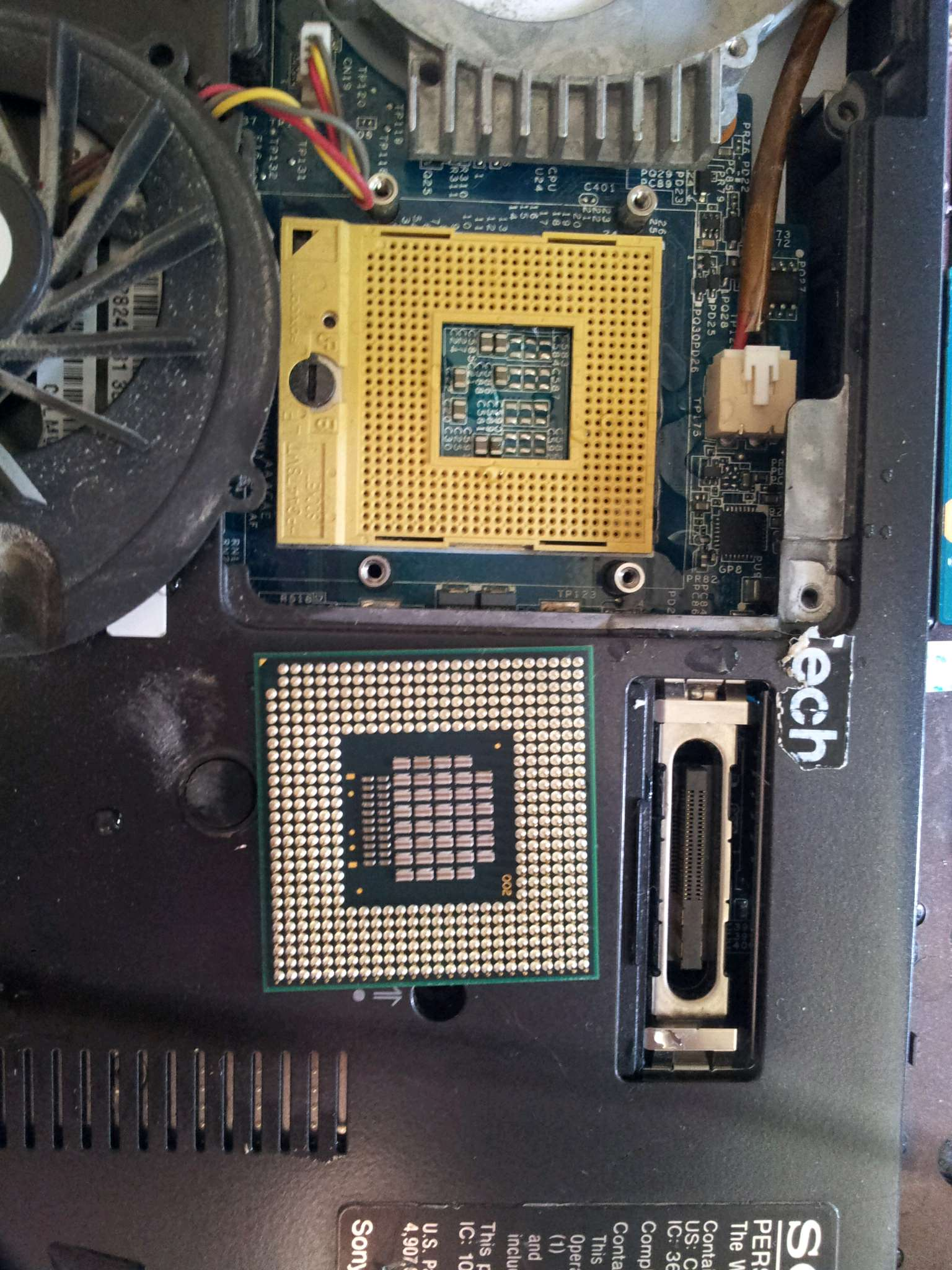
Inside of old Sony VAIO laptop (VGN-C140G), showing processor and socket for Socket M

Socket M typically uses the Intel 945PM/945GM chipsets which support up to 667 MHz FSB and the Intel PM965/GM965 which allows 800 MHz FSB support, though the Socket M, PM965/GM965 combination is less common. The "Sossaman" Xeons use the E7520 chipset. Although conflicting information has been published, no 45 nm Penryn processors have been released for Socket M.

== Relation to other sockets ==
Socket M is pin-compatible with the older mobile Socket 479 (mPGA478A) for Pentium III-M processors but is not electrically compatible. Socket M is not pin-compatible with the older desktop Socket 478 (mPGA478B) for Pentium 4 processors or the newer mobile Socket P (mPGA478MN) for later Core processors by location of one pin; it is also incompatible with most versions of the older mobile Socket 479 (mPGA478C), especially those used for Pentium M, which also used an incompatible pin layout.

== See also ==
- List of Intel microprocessors
