= 6600K =

6600K may refer to:

- AMD A8-6600K, CPU released in 2013
- Intel Core i5-6600K, CPU released in 2015
