= List of Intel Core desktop processors =

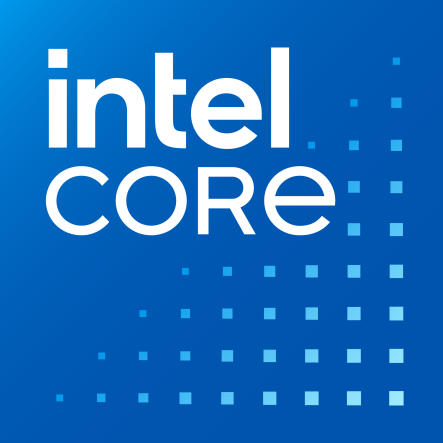
The latest badge promoting the Intel Core branding

The following is a list of Intel Core desktop processors. This includes Intel's original Core (Solo/Duo) mobile series based on the Enhanced Pentium M microarchitecture; as well as its Core 2 (Duo/Quad/Extreme), Core i3, Core i5, Core i7, Core i9, Core M (m3/m5/m7), Core 3, Core 5, Core 7, and Core 9 branded processors.

Release timeline Desktop processors
2008	Core i 1st generation (Nehalem microarchitecture)
2009
2010	Core i 1st generation (Westmere microarchitecture)
2011	Core i 2nd generation (Sandy Bridge microarchitecture)
2012	Core i 3rd generation (Ivy Bridge microarchitecture)
2013	Core i 4th generation (Haswell microarchitecture)
2014
2015	Core i 5th generation (Broadwell microarchitecture)
2015	Core i 6th generation (Skylake microarchitecture)
2016
2017	Core i 7th generation (Kaby Lake microarchitecture)
2017	Core i 8th generation (Coffee Lake microarchitecture)
2018	Core i 9th generation (Coffee Lake microarchitecture)
2019
2020	Core i 10th generation (Comet Lake microarchitecture)
2021	Core i 11th generation (Rocket Lake)
2022	Core i 12th generation (Alder Lake)
2023	Core i 13th generation (Raptor Lake)
2023	Core i 14th generation (Raptor Lake)
2024	Core Ultra Series 2 (Arrow Lake)

== Core 2 ==
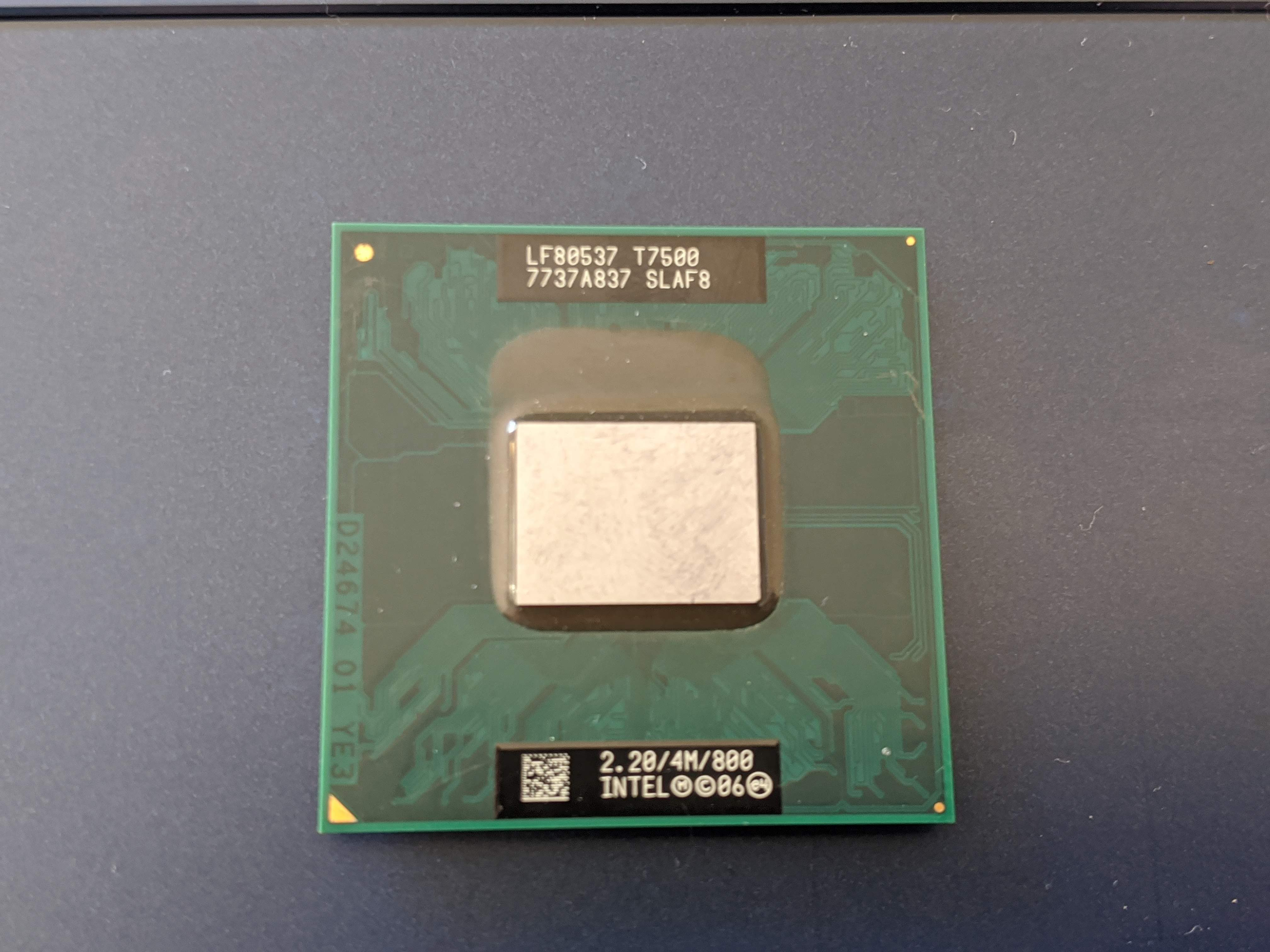
Front side of an Intel Core 2 Duo T7500 processor

=== "Allendale" (65 nm, 800 MT/s) ===
- All models support: MMX, SSE, SSE2, SSE3, SSSE3, Enhanced Intel SpeedStep Technology (EIST), Intel 64, XD bit (an NX bit implementation), Intel Active Management Technology (iAMT2)^{a}
- Die size: 111 mm^{2}
- Steppings: L2^{b}, M0^{c}, G0^{d}

Model	sSpec number	Cores	Clock rate	L2 cache	FSB	Mult.	Voltage	TDP	Socket	Release date	Part number(s)	Release price (USD)
Core 2 Duo E4300	SL9TB (L2); SLA99 (M0); SLA5G	2	1.8 GHz	2 MB	800 MT/s	9×	0.85–1.5 V	65 W	LGA 775	January 2007	HH80557PG0332M; BX80557E4300	$163
Core 2 Duo E4400	SLA3F (L2); SLA98 (M0); SLA5F	2	2 GHz	2 MB	800 MT/s	10×	0.85–1.5 V	65 W	LGA 775	April 2007	HH80557PG0412M; BX80557E4400	$133
Core 2 Duo E4500	SLA95 (M0)	2	2.2 GHz	2 MB	800 MT/s	11×	0.85–1.5 V	65 W	LGA 775	July 2007	HH80557PG0492M; BX80557E4500	$133
Core 2 Duo E4600	SLA94 (M0)	2	2.4 GHz	2 MB	800 MT/s	12×	1.162–1.312 V	65 W	LGA 775	October 2007	HH80557PG0562M; BX80557E4600	$133
Core 2 Duo E4700	SLALT (G0)	2	2.6 GHz	2 MB	800 MT/s	13×	1.162–1.312 V	65 W	LGA 775	March 2008	HH80557PG0642M; BX80557E4700	$133

^c Note: The M0 and G0 Steppings have better optimizations to lower idle power consumption from 12W to 8W.

^d Note: The E4700 uses G0 Stepping which makes it a Conroe CPU.

=== "Conroe" (65 nm, 1066 MT/s) ===
- All models support: MMX, SSE, SSE2, SSE3, SSSE3, Enhanced Intel SpeedStep Technology (EIST), Intel 64, XD bit (an NX bit implementation), Intel Active Management Technology (iAMT2)^{a}
- All models support: Intel VT-x
- Die size: 143 mm^{2}
- Steppings: B2, G0

Model	sSpec number	Cores	Clock rate	L2 cache	FSB	Mult.	Voltage	TDP	Socket	Release date	Part number(s)	Release price (USD)
Core 2 Duo E6300	SL9SA (B2); SL9TA (L2); SLA2L (?); SLA5E (?)	2	1.87 GHz	2 MB	1066 MT/s	7×	0.85–1.5 V	65 W	LGA 775	July 2006	HH80557PH0362M; BX80557E6300; BX80557E6300T2	$183
Core 2 Duo E6320	SLA4U (B2)	2	1.87 GHz	4 MB	1066 MT/s	7×	0.85–1.5 V	65 W	LGA 775	April 2007	HH80557PH0364M; BX80557E6320	$163
Core 2 Duo E6400	SL9S9 (B2); SLA5D (?); SL9T9 (L2); SLA97 (M0)	2	2.13 GHz	2 MB	1066 MT/s	8×	0.85–1.5 V	65 W	LGA 775	July 2006	HH80557PH0462M; BX80557E6400	$224
Core 2 Duo E6420	SLA4T (B2)	2	2.13 GHz	4 MB	1066 MT/s	8×	0.85–1.5 V	65 W	LGA 775	April 2007	HH80557PH0464M; BX80557E6420	$183
Core 2 Duo E6600	SL9S8 (B2); SL9ZL (B2)	2	2.4 GHz	4 MB	1066 MT/s	9×	0.85–1.5 V	65 W	LGA 775	July 2006	HH80557PH0564M; BX80557E6600	$316
Core 2 Duo E6700	SL9S7 (B2); SL9ZF (B2)	2	2.67 GHz	4 MB	1066 MT/s	10×	0.85–1.5 V	65 W	LGA 775	July 2006	HH80557PH0674M; BX80557E6700	$530

^aNote: of the E6000 series processors, only models E6550, E6750, and E6850 support Intel's Trusted Execution Technology (TXT).

^b Note: The L2 Stepping, and models with sSpec SL9ZL, SL9ZF, SLA4U, SLA4T, have better optimizations to lower idle power consumption from 22W to 12W.

^c Note: The M0 and G0 Steppings have better optimizations to lower idle power consumption from 12W to 8W.

=== "Conroe" (65 nm, 1333 MT/s) ===
- All models support: MMX, SSE, SSE2, SSE3, SSSE3, Enhanced Intel SpeedStep Technology (EIST), Intel 64, XD bit (an NX bit implementation), Intel Active Management Technology (iAMT2)^{a}
- All models support: Intel VT-x
- All E6x50 models support: Intel VT-x, Trusted Execution Technology (TXT)
- Die size: 143 mm^{2}
- Transistor count: 291 million
- Steppings: B2, G0

Model	sSpec number	Cores	Clock rate	L2 cache	FSB	Mult.	Voltage	TDP	Socket	Release date	Part number(s)	Release price (USD)
Core 2 Duo E6540	SLAA5 (G0)	2	2.33 GHz	4 MB	1333 MT/s	7×	0.85–1.5 V	65 W	LGA 775	July 2007	HH80557PJ0534M	$163
Core 2 Duo E6550	SLA9X (G0); SLAAT (?)	2	2.33 GHz	4 MB	1333 MT/s	7×	0.85–1.5 V	65 W	LGA 775	July 2007	HH80557PJ0534MG; BX80557E6550; BX80557E6550R	$163
Core 2 Duo E6750	SLA9V (G0); SLAAR (?)	2	2.67 GHz	4 MB	1333 MT/s	8×	0.85–1.5 V	65 W	LGA 775	July 2007	HH80557PJ0674MG; BX80557E6750; BX80557E6750R	$183
Core 2 Duo E6850	SLA9U (G0)	2	3 GHz	4 MB	1333 MT/s	9×	0.85–1.5 V	65 W	LGA 775	July 2007	HH80557PJ0804MG; BX80557E6850	$266

^aNote: of the E6000 series processors, only models E6550, E6750, and E6850 support Intel's Trusted Execution Technology (TXT).

^b Note: The L2 Stepping, and models with sSpec SL9ZL, SL9ZF, SLA4U, SLA4T, have better optimizations to lower idle power consumption from 22W to 12W.

^c Note: The M0 and G0 Steppings have better optimizations to lower idle power consumption from 12W to 8W.

=== "Conroe-CL" (65 nm, 1066 MT/s) ===
- All models support: MMX, SSE, SSE2, SSE3, SSSE3, Enhanced Intel SpeedStep Technology (EIST), Intel 64, XD bit (an NX bit implementation), Intel Active Management Technology (iAMT2), Intel VT-x, Trusted Execution Technology (TXT)
- Die size: 111 mm^{2} (Conroe)
- Steppings: ?

Model	sSpec number	Cores	Clock rate	L2 cache	FSB	Mult.	Voltage	TDP	Socket	Release date	Part number(s)	Release price (USD)
Core 2 Duo E6305	SLAGF	2	1.87 GHz	2 MB	1066 MT/s	7×		65 W	LGA 771		HH80557KH036F	
Core 2 Duo E6405	SLAGG	2	2.13 GHz	2 MB	1066 MT/s	8×		65 W	LGA 771		HH80557KH046F	

=== "Conroe XE" (65 nm) ===
These models feature an unlocked clock multiplier

- All models support: MMX, SSE, SSE2, SSE3, SSSE3, Enhanced Intel SpeedStep Technology (EIST), Intel 64, XD bit (an NX bit implementation), Intel Active Management Technology (iAMT2), Intel VT-x, Trusted Execution Technology (TXT)
- Die size: 143 mm^{2}
- Steppings: B1, B2
- The X6900 was never publicly released.

Model	sSpec number	Cores	Clock rate	L2 cache	FSB	Mult.	Voltage	TDP	Socket	Release date	Part number(s)	Release price (USD)
Core 2 Extreme X6800	SL9S5 (B2); QPHV (B1)	2	2.93 GHz	4 MB	1066 MT/s	11×	0.85–1.5 V	75 W	LGA 775	July 2006	HH80557PH0677M; BX80557X6800	$999
Core 2 Extreme X6900	QTOM (B2); SL9S4 (B2)	2	3.2 GHz	4 MB	1066 MT/s	12×	0.85–1.5 V	75 W	LGA 775	N/A	HH80557PH0884M	N/A

=== "Kentsfield" (65 nm) ===
- All models support: MMX, SSE, SSE2, SSE3, SSSE3, Enhanced Intel SpeedStep Technology (EIST), Intel 64, XD bit (an NX bit implementation), Intel Active Management Technology (iAMT2), Intel VT-x
- Die size: 2 ×143 mm^{2}
- Steppings: B3, G0

Model	sSpec number	Cores	Clock rate	L2 cache	FSB	Mult.	Voltage	TDP	Socket	Release date	Part number(s)	Release price (USD)
Core 2 Quad Q6400	SL9UN (B3)	4	2.13 GHz	2 × 4 MB	1066 MT/s	8×	0.8500–1.500 V	105 W	LGA 775		HH80562PH0468M	OEM
Core 2 Quad Q6600	SL9UM (B3); SLACR (G0)	4	2.4 GHz	2 × 4 MB	1066 MT/s	9×	0.8500–1.500 V	105 W; 95 W	LGA 775	January 2007	HH80562PH0568M; BX80562Q6600; BXC80562Q6600	$851
Core 2 Quad Q6700	SLACQ (G0)	4	2.67 GHz	2 × 4 MB	1066 MT/s	10×	0.8500–1.500 V	95 W	LGA 775	July 2007	HH80562PH0678M; BX80562Q6700; BXC80562Q6700	$530

=== "Kentsfield XE" (65 nm) ===
These models feature an unlocked clock multiplier

- All models support: MMX, SSE, SSE2, SSE3, SSSE3, Enhanced Intel SpeedStep Technology (EIST), Intel 64, XD bit (an NX bit implementation), Intel Active Management Technology (iAMT2), Intel VT-x
- Die size: 2 ×143 mm^{2}
- Steppings: B3, G0

Model	sSpec number	Cores	Clock rate	L2 cache	FSB	Mult.	Voltage	TDP	Socket	Release date	Part number(s)	Release price (USD)
Core 2 Extreme QX6700	SL9UL (B3)	4	2.67 GHz	2 × 4 MB	1066 MT/s	10×	0.8500–1.500 V	130 W	LGA 775	November 2006	HH80562PH0678M	$999
Core 2 Extreme QX6800	SL9UK (B3); SLACP (G0)	4	2.93 GHz	2 × 4 MB	1066 MT/s	11×	0.8500–1.500 V	130 W	LGA 775	April 2007	HH80562PH0778M; HH80562XH0778M	$1199
Core 2 Extreme QX6850	SLAFN (G0)	4	3 GHz	2 × 4 MB	1333 MT/s	9×	0.8500–1.500 V	130 W	LGA 775	July 2007	HH80562XJ0808M	$999

=== "Wolfdale-3M" (45 nm, 1066 MT/s) ===
- All models support: MMX, SSE, SSE2, SSE3, SSSE3, SSE4.1, Enhanced Intel SpeedStep Technology (EIST), Intel 64, XD bit (an NX bit implementation), Intel Active Management Technology (iAMT2)
- Die size: 82 mm^{2}
- Transistor Count: 230 million
- Steppings: M0, R0
- Models with a part number ending in "ML" instead of "M" support Intel VT-x

Model	sSpec number	Cores	Clock rate	L2 cache	FSB	Mult.	Voltage	TDP	Socket	Release date	Part number(s)	Release price (USD)
Core 2 Duo E7200	SLAPC (M0); SLAVN (M0); SLB9W (?)	2	2.53 GHz	3 MB	1066 MT/s	9.5×	0.85–1.3625 V	65 W	LGA 775	April 2008	EU80571PH0613M; BX80571E7200	$133
Core 2 Duo E7300	SLAPB (M0); SLB9X (R0); SLGA9 (R0)	2	2.67 GHz	3 MB	1066 MT/s	10×	0.85–1.3625 V	65 W	LGA 775	August 2008	EU80571PH0673M; AT80571PH0673M; BX80571E7300	$133
Core 2 Duo E7400	SLB9Y (R0); SLGQ8 (R0); SLGW3 (R0, with VT)	2	2.8 GHz	3 MB	1066 MT/s	10.5×	0.85–1.3625 V	65 W	LGA 775	October 2008	AT80571PH0723M; AT80571PH0723ML; BX80571E7400	$133
Core 2 Duo E7500	SLB9Z (R0); SLGTE (R0, with VT)	2	2.93 GHz	3 MB	1066 MT/s	11×	0.85–1.3625 V	65 W	LGA 775	January 2009	AT80571PH0773M; AT80571PH0773ML; BX80571E7500	$133
Core 2 Duo E7600	SLGTD (R0, with VT)	2	3.07 GHz	3 MB	1066 MT/s	11.5×	0.85–1.3625 V	65 W	LGA 775	May 2009	AT80571PH0833ML; BX80571E7600	$133

=== "Wolfdale" (45 nm, 1333 MT/s) ===
- All models(except E8190) support: MMX, SSE, SSE2, SSE3, SSSE3, SSE4.1, Enhanced Intel SpeedStep Technology (EIST), Intel 64, XD bit (an NX bit implementation), iAMT2 (Intel Active Management Technology), Intel VT-x ^{[a]}, Intel VT-d ^{[b]}, Trusted Execution Technology (TXT)
- Die size: 107 mm^{2}
- Transistor Count: 410 million
- Steppings: C0, E0

Model	sSpec number	Cores	Clock rate	L2 cache	FSB	Mult.	Voltage	TDP	Socket	Release date	Part number(s)	Release price (USD)
Core 2 Duo E8190	SLAQR (C0)	2	2.67 GHz	6 MB	1333 MT/s	8×	0.85–1.3625 V	65 W	LGA 775	January 2008	EU80570PJ0676MN	$163
Core 2 Duo E8200	SLAPP (C0)	2	2.67 GHz	6 MB	1333 MT/s	8×	0.85–1.3625 V	65 W	LGA 775	January 2008	EU80570PJ0676M; BX80570E8200	$163
Core 2 Duo E8290	SLAQQ (?)	2	2.83 GHz	6 MB	1333 MT/s	8.5×	0.85–1.3625 V	65 W	LGA 775	2008?	EU80570PJ0736MN	?
Core 2 Duo E8300	SLAPJ (C0); SLAPN (C0)	2	2.83 GHz	6 MB	1333 MT/s	8.5×	0.85–1.3625 V	65 W	LGA 775	April 2008	EU80570AJ0736M; EU80570PJ0736M	$163
Core 2 Duo E8400	SLAPL (C0); SLB9J (E0)	2	3 GHz	6 MB	1333 MT/s	9×	0.85–1.3625 V	65 W	LGA 775	January 2008	EU80570PJ0806M; AT80570PJ0806M; BX80570E8400	$183
Core 2 Duo E8500	SLAPK (C0); SLB9K (E0)	2	3.17 GHz	6 MB	1333 MT/s	9.5×	0.85–1.3625 V	65 W	LGA 775	January 2008	EU80570PJ0876M; AT80570PJ0876M; BX80570E8500	$266
Core 2 Duo E8600	SLB9L (E0)	2	3.33 GHz	6 MB	1333 MT/s	10×	0.85–1.3625 V	65 W	LGA 775	August 2008	AT80570PJ0876M; BX80570E8600	$266
Core 2 Duo E8700	SLB9E (E0)	2	3.5 GHz	6 MB	1333 MT/s	10.5×	0.85–1.3625 V	65 W	LGA 775	January 2009*	AT80570PJ1006M(OEM)	NA

^{a} Note: The E8190 and E8290 do not support Intel VT-d.

Note 2: E8700 is a rare example in Intel's history where a model was yanked from Intel ARK without a recall notice and after a SSPEC was assigned. Working examples were seen, believed to have been released to OEM, but none was offered in retail PCs.

See also: Versions of the same Wolfdale core in an LGA 771 are available under the Dual-Core Xeon brand.

=== "Yorkfield-6M" (45 nm) ===
- All models support: MMX, SSE, SSE2, SSE3, SSSE3, SSE4.1, Enhanced Intel SpeedStep Technology (EIST), Intel 64, XD bit (an NX bit implementation), Intel Active Management Technology (iAMT2), Intel VT-x ^{[a]}, Intel VT-d ^{[b]}, Trusted Execution Technology (TXT) ^{[c]}
- Die size: 2 × 82 mm^{2}
- Steppings: M0, M1, R0
- All Q8xxx models are Yorkfield-6M MCMs with only 2 × 2 MB L2 cache enabled.

Model	sSpec number	Cores	Clock rate	L2 cache	FSB	Mult.	Voltage	TDP	Socket	Release date	Part number(s)	Release price (USD)
Core 2 Quad Q8200	SLB5M (M1); SLG9S (R0)	4	2.33 GHz	2 × 2 MB	1333 MT/s	7×	0.85–1.3625 V	95 W	LGA 775	August 2008	EU80580PJ0534MN; AT80580PJ0534MN	$224
Core 2 Quad Q8200S	SLG9T (R0); SLGSS (R0, with Intel VT-x)	4	2.33 GHz	2 × 2 MB	1333 MT/s	7×	0.85–1.3625 V	65 W	LGA 775	January 2009	AT80580AJ0534MN; AT80580AJ0534ML	$245
Core 2 Quad Q8300	SLB5W (R0); SLGUR (R0, with Intel VT-x)	4	2.5 GHz	2 × 2 MB	1333 MT/s	7.5×	0.85–1.3625 V	95 W	LGA 775	November 2008	AT80580PJ0604MN; AT80580PJ0604ML	$224
Core 2 Quad Q8400	SLGT6 (R0, with Intel VT-x)	4	2.67 GHz	2 × 2 MB	1333 MT/s	8×	0.85–1.3625 V	95 W	LGA 775	April 2009	AT80580PJ0674ML	$183
Core 2 Quad Q8400S	SLGT7 (R0, with Intel VT-x)	4	2.67 GHz	2 × 2 MB	1333 MT/s	8×	0.85–1.3625 V	65 W	LGA 775	April 2009	AT80580AJ0674ML	$245
Core 2 Quad Q9300	SLAMX (M0); SLAWE (M1)	4	2.5 GHz	2 × 3 MB	1333 MT/s	7.5×	0.85–1.3625 V	95 W	LGA 775	March 2008	EU80580PJ0606M	$266
Core 2 Quad Q9400	SLB6B (R0)	4	2.67 GHz	2 × 3 MB	1333 MT/s	8×	0.85–1.3625 V	95 W	LGA 775	August 2008	AT80580PJ0676M	$266
Core 2 Quad Q9400S	SLG9U (R0)	4	2.67 GHz	2 × 3 MB	1333 MT/s	8×	0.85–1.3625 V	65 W	LGA 775	January 2009	AT80580AJ0676M	$320
Core 2 Quad Q9500	SLGZ4 (R0)	4	2.83 GHz	2 × 3 MB	1333 MT/s	8.5×	0.85–1.3625 V	95 W	LGA 775	January 2010	AT80580PJ0736ML	$183
Core 2 Quad Q9505	SLGYY (R0)	4	2.83 GHz	2 × 3 MB	1333 MT/s	8.5×	0.85–1.3625 V	95 W	LGA 775	August 2009	AT80580PJ0736MG	$213
Core 2 Quad Q9505S	SLGYZ (R0)	4	2.83 GHz	2 × 3 MB	1333 MT/s	8.5×	0.85–1.3625 V	65 W	LGA 775	August 2009	AT80580AJ0736MG	$277

^{a} Note: Q8200, Q8200S, Q8300 SLB5W does not support Intel VT-x.

^{b} Note: Q8200, Q8200S, Q8300, Q8400, Q8400S, Q9500 does not support Intel VT-d.

^{c} Note: Q8200, Q8200S, Q8300, Q8400, Q8400S does not support TXT.

=== Yorkfield (45 nm) ===
- All models support: MMX, SSE, SSE2, SSE3, SSSE3, SSE4.1, Enhanced Intel SpeedStep Technology (EIST), Intel 64, XD bit (an NX bit implementation), Intel Active Management Technology (iAMT2), Intel VT-x, Intel VT-d, Trusted Execution Technology (TXT)
- Die size: 2 × 107 mm^{2}
- The "S" suffix denotes to low power consumption specs with 65W TDP, equivalent to that of a standard Core 2 Duo. Supplied to OEM channels only and mostly seen as options for SFF platforms. The first batch of Q9550S has no "S" marking on lid, thus only differentiated by SSPEC.
- Steppings: C0, C1, E0

Model	sSpec number	Cores	Clock rate	L2 cache	FSB	Mult.	Voltage	TDP	Socket	Release date	Part number(s)	Release price (USD)
Core 2 Quad Q9450	SLAN6 (C0); SLAWR (C1)	4	2.67 GHz	2 × 6 MB	1333 MT/s	8×	0.85–1.3625 V	95 W	LGA 775	March 2008	EU80569PJ067N	$316
Core 2 Quad Q9550	SLAN4 (C0); SLAWQ (C1); SLB8V (E0)	4	2.83 GHz	2 × 6 MB	1333 MT/s	8.5×	0.85–1.3625 V	95 W	LGA 775	March 2008	EU80569PJ073N; AT80569PJ073N	$530
Core 2 Quad Q9550S*	SLGAE (E0)	4	2.83 GHz	2 × 6 MB	1333 MT/s	8.5×	0.85–1.3625 V	65 W	LGA 775	January 2009	AT80569AJ073N	$369
Core 2 Quad Q9650	SLB8W (E0)	4	3 GHz	2 × 6 MB	1333 MT/s	9×	0.85–1.3625 V	95 W	LGA 775	August 2008	AT80569PJ080N; BX80569Q9650	$530

=== "Yorkfield XE" (45 nm) ===
- These models feature an unlocked clock multiplier
- All models support: MMX, SSE, SSE2, SSE3, SSSE3, SSE4.1, Enhanced Intel SpeedStep Technology (EIST), Intel 64, XD bit (an NX bit implementation), Intel Active Management Technology (iAMT2), Intel VT-x
- I/O Acceleration Technology (Intel I/OAT) supported by: QX9775
- Intel VT-d supported by: QX9650
- Die size: 2 × 107 mm^{2}
- Steppings: C0, C1, E0
- The QX9750 was never publicly released. Engineering samples have surfaced along with claims that Intel gave them away to employees sometime in 2009.

Model	sSpec number	Cores	Clock rate	L2 cache	FSB	Mult.	Voltage	TDP	Socket	Release date	Part number(s)	Release price (USD)
Core 2 Extreme QX9650	SLAN3 (C0); SLAWN (C1)	4	3 GHz	2 × 6 MB	1333 MT/s	9×	0.85–1.3625 V	130 W	LGA 775	November 2007	EU80569XJ080NL; BX80569QX9650	$999
Core 2 Extreme QX9750	QJEE (E0); SLBBU (E0)	4	3.17 GHz	2 × 6 MB	1333 MT/s	9.5×	0.85–1.3625 V	130 W	LGA 775	N/A	AT80569XL087NL	N/A
Core 2 Extreme QX9770	SLAN2 (C0); SLAWM (C1)	4	3.2 GHz	2 × 6 MB	1600 MT/s	8×	0.85–1.3625 V	136 W	LGA 775	March 2008	EU80569XL088NL; BX80569QX9770	$1399
Core 2 Extreme QX9775	SLANY (C0)	4	3.2 GHz	2 × 6 MB	1600 MT/s	8×	0.85–1.35 V	150 W	LGA 771	March 2008	EU80574XL088N; BX80574QX9775	$1499

== Core i (1st gen) ==
=== Lynnfield ===
Common features of Core i (1st gen) Lynnfield desktop processors:

- Socket: LGA 1156.
- All CPUs support the P55 chipset.
- All the CPUs support dual-channel DDR3 RAM at up to 1333 MT/s speed.
- All CPU models provide 16 lanes of PCIe 2.0.
- All CPUs feature a DMI 1.0 bus to the chipset (PCH).
- All models support: MMX, SSE, SSE2, SSE3, SSSE3, SSE4.1, SSE4.2, Intel 64, Intel VT-x.
- No integrated graphics.
- L1 cache: 64 KB (32 KB data + 32 KB instructions) per core.
- L2 cache: 256 KB per core.
- Fabrication process: 45 nm.
- K-suffix processors have an unlocked multiplier and can be overclocked.

Processor branding	Model	Cores (Threads)	Clock rate (GHz)		Smart Cache	TDP	Release date	MSRP
Processor branding	Model	Cores (Threads)	Base	Turbo	Smart Cache	TDP	Release date	MSRP
Core i7	880	4 (8)	3.06	3.73	8 MB	95 W	May 2010	US $583
Core i7	875K	4 (8)	2.93	3.60	8 MB	95 W	May 2010	US $342
Core i7	870	4 (8)	2.93	3.60	8 MB	95 W	September 2009	US $562
Core i7	870S	4 (8)	2.67	3.60	8 MB	82 W	July 2010	US $351
Core i7	860	4 (8)	2.80	3.46	8 MB	95 W	September 2009	US $284
Core i7	860S	4 (8)	2.53	3.46	8 MB	82 W	January 2010	US $337
Core i5	760	4 (4)	2.80	3.33	8 MB	95 W	July 2010	US $205
Core i5	750	4 (4)	2.66	3.20	8 MB	95 W	September 2009	US $196
Core i5	750S	4 (4)	2.40	3.20	8 MB	82 W	January 2010	US $259

=== Bloomfield ===
Common features of Core i (1st gen) Bloomfield desktop processors:

- Socket: LGA 1366.
- All CPUs support the X58 chipset.
- All the CPUs support triple-channel DDR3 RAM, at up to 1066 MT/s speed.
- PCIe lanes are provided by the northbridge on the motherboard rather than by the CPU.
- All CPUs feature a QPI bus to the chipset (northbridge).
  - Bus speed is 4.8 GT/s on all the processors except for the Extreme Edition models, which run at 6.4 GT/s.
- All models support: MMX, SSE, SSE2, SSE3, SSSE3, SSE4.1, SSE4.2, Intel 64, Intel VT-x.
- No integrated graphics.
- L1 cache: 64 KB (32 KB data + 32 KB instructions) per core.
- L2 cache: 256 KB per core.
- Fabrication process: 45 nm.
- Extreme Edition processors have an unlocked multiplier and can be overclocked.

Processor branding	Model	Cores (Threads)	Clock rate (GHz)		Smart Cache	TDP	Release date	MSRP
Processor branding	Model	Cores (Threads)	Base	Turbo	Smart Cache	TDP	Release date	MSRP
Core i7	975 Extreme Edition	4 (8)	3.33	3.60	8 MB	130 W	June 2009	US $999
Core i7	965 Extreme Edition	4 (8)	3.20	3.46	8 MB	130 W	November 2008	US $999
Core i7	960	4 (8)	3.20	3.46	8 MB	130 W	October 2009	US $562
Core i7	950	4 (8)	3.06	3.33	8 MB	130 W	June 2009	US $562
Core i7	940	4 (8)	2.93	3.20	8 MB	130 W	November 2008	US $562
Core i7	930	4 (8)	2.80	3.06	8 MB	130 W	February 2010	US $294
Core i7	920	4 (8)	2.66	2.93	8 MB	130 W	November 2008	US $284

=== Clarkdale ===
Intel i3 540 CPU die shot (Westmere)

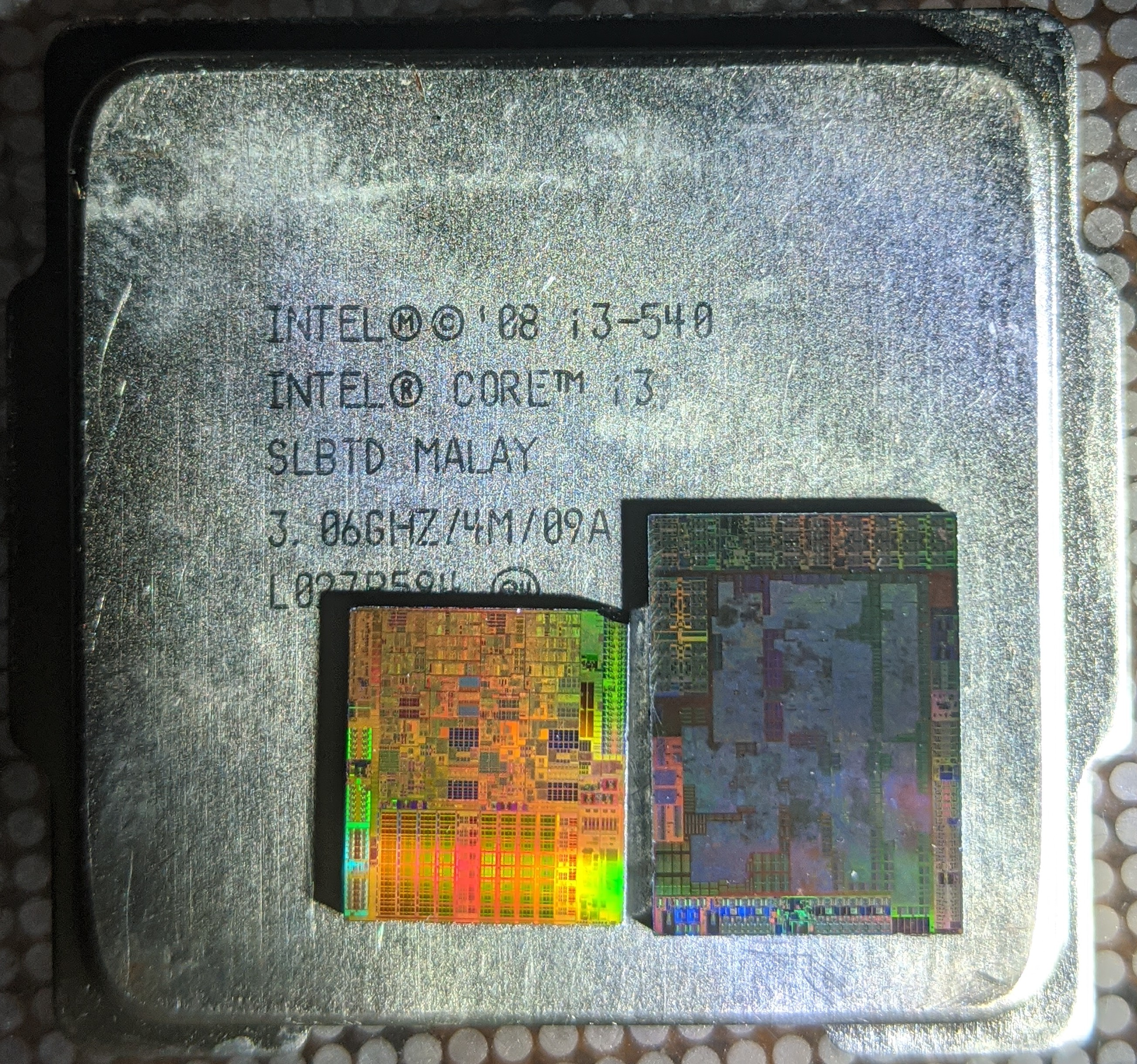
Intel i3 540 CPU (left) and iGPU (right) dies

Common features of Core i (1st gen) Clarkdale desktop processors:

- Socket: LGA 1156.
- Supported chipsets: H55, H57, P55, Q57.
- All the CPUs support dual-channel DDR3 RAM, at up to 1333 MT/s speed.
- All CPU models provide 16 lanes of PCIe 2.0.
- All CPUs feature a DMI 1.0 bus to the chipset (PCH).
- All models support: MMX, SSE, SSE2, SSE3, SSSE3, SSE4.1, SSE4.2, Intel 64, Intel VT-x, AES instruction set.
- L1 cache: 64 KB (32 KB data + 32 KB instructions) per core.
- L2 cache: 256 KB per core.
- Fabrication process: 32 nm.
- K-suffix processors have an unlocked multiplier and can be overclocked.

Processor branding	Model	Cores (Threads)	Clock rate (GHz)		Integrated GPU		Smart Cache	TDP	Release date	MSRP
Processor branding	Model	Cores (Threads)	Base	Turbo	Model	Clock (MHz)	Smart Cache	TDP	Release date	MSRP
Core i5	680	2 (4)	3.60	3.86	HD Graphics	733	4 MB	73 W	April 2010	US $294
Core i5	670	2 (4)	3.46	3.73	HD Graphics	733	4 MB	73 W	January 2010	US $284
Core i5	661	2 (4)	3.33	3.60	HD Graphics	900	4 MB	87 W	January 2010	US $196
Core i5	660	2 (4)	3.33	3.60	HD Graphics	733	4 MB	73 W	January 2010	US $196
Core i5	655K	2 (4)	3.20	3.46	HD Graphics	733	4 MB	73 W	May 2010	US $216
Core i5	650	2 (4)	3.20	3.46	HD Graphics	733	4 MB	73 W	January 2010	US $176
Core i3	560	2 (4)	3.33	—N/a	HD Graphics	733	4 MB	73 W	August 2010	US $138
Core i3	550	2 (4)	3.20	—N/a	HD Graphics	733	4 MB	73 W	May 2010	US $138
Core i3	540	2 (4)	3.06	—N/a	HD Graphics	733	4 MB	73 W	January 2010	US $133
Core i3	530	2 (4)	2.93	—N/a	HD Graphics	733	4 MB	73 W	January 2010	US $113

=== Gulftown ===
Common features of Core i (1st gen) Gulftown desktop processors:

- Socket: LGA 1366.
- All CPUs support the X58 chipset.
- All the CPUs support triple-channel DDR3 RAM, at up to 1066 MT/s speed.
- PCIe lanes are provided by the northbridge on the motherboard rather than by the CPU.
- All CPUs feature a QPI bus to the chipset (northbridge).
  - Bus speed is 4.8 GT/s on all the processors except for the X-suffix models, which run at 6.4 GT/s.
- All models support: MMX, SSE, SSE2, SSE3, SSSE3, SSE4.1, SSE4.2, Intel 64, Intel VT-x
- No integrated graphics.
- L1 cache: 64 KB (32 KB data + 32 KB instructions) per core.
- L2 cache: 256 KB per core.
- Fabrication process: 32 nm.
- X-suffix processors have an unlocked multiplier and can be overclocked.

Processor branding	Model	Cores (Threads)	Clock rate (GHz)		Smart Cache	TDP	Release date	MSRP
Processor branding	Model	Cores (Threads)	Base	Turbo	Smart Cache	TDP	Release date	MSRP
Core i7	990X	6 (12)	3.46	3.73	12 MB	130 W	February 2011	US $999
Core i7	980X	6 (12)	3.33	3.60	12 MB	130 W	March 2010	US $999
Core i7	980	6 (12)	3.33	3.60	12 MB	130 W	June 2011	US $583
Core i7	970	6 (12)	3.20	3.46	12 MB	130 W	July 2010	US $885

== Core i (2nd gen) and Xeon E3 ==
=== Sandy Bridge-DT ===
Common features of Core i (2nd gen) desktop processors:

Intel i5 2500 die shot

- Socket: LGA 1155.
- Supported chipsets: C206, Z68, P67, H67, Q67, Q65, B65, H61.
- All the CPUs support dual-channel DDR3 RAM, at up to 1333 MT/s speed.
- All CPU models provide 16 lanes of PCIe 2.0.
- All CPUs feature a DMI 2.0 bus to the chipset (PCH).
- All models support: MMX, SSE, SSE2, SSE3, SSSE3, SSE4.1, SSE4.2, AVX, Intel 64, Intel VT-x
- L1 cache: 64 KB (32 KB data + 32 KB instructions) per core.
- L2 cache: 256 KB per core.
- Fabrication process: 32 nm.
- K-suffix processors have an unlocked multiplier and can be overclocked.
- i3-2120, i5-2400, and i7-2600 are available as embedded processors.
- The Core i3-2102, once upgraded via Intel Upgrade Service, operates at 3.6 GHz, has 3 MB L3 cache and is recognized as Core i3-2153.

Processor branding	Model	Cores (Threads)	Clock rate (GHz)		Integrated GPU		Smart Cache	TDP	Release date	MSRP
Processor branding	Model	Cores (Threads)	Base	Turbo	Model	Clock (MHz)	Smart Cache	TDP	Release date	MSRP
Core i7	2700K	4 (8)	3.5	3.9	HD 3000	850–1350	8 MB	95 W	October 2011	US $332
Core i7	2600K	4 (8)	3.4	3.8	HD 3000	850–1350	8 MB	95 W	January 2011	US $317
Core i7	2600	4 (8)	3.4	3.8	HD 2000	850–1350	8 MB	95 W	January 2011	US $294
Core i7	2600S	4 (8)	2.8	3.8	HD 2000	850–1350	8 MB	65 W	January 2011	US $306
Core i5	2550K	4 (4)	3.4	3.8	—N/a		6 MB	95 W	January 2012	US $225
Core i5	2500K	4 (4)	3.3	3.7	HD 3000	850–1100	6 MB	95 W	January 2011	US $216
Core i5	2500	4 (4)	3.3	3.7	HD 2000	850–1100	6 MB	95 W	January 2011	US $205
Core i5	2500S	4 (4)	2.7	3.7	HD 2000	850–1100	6 MB	65 W	January 2011	US $216
Core i5	2500T	4 (4)	2.3	3.3	HD 2000	650–1250	6 MB	45 W	January 2011	US $216
Core i5	2450P	4 (4)	3.2	3.5	—N/a		6 MB	95 W	January 2012	US $195
Core i5	2400	4 (4)	3.1	3.4	HD 2000	850–1100	6 MB	95 W	January 2011	US $184
Core i5	2405S	4 (4)	2.5	3.3	HD 3000	850–1100	6 MB	65 W	May 2011	US $205
Core i5	2400S	4 (4)	2.5	3.3	HD 2000	850–1100	6 MB	65 W	January 2011	US $195
Core i5	2390T	2 (4)	2.7	3.5	HD 2000	650–1100	3 MB	35 W	February 2011	US $195
Core i5	2380P	4 (4)	3.1	3.4	—N/a		6 MB	95 W	January 2012	US $177
Core i5	2320	4 (4)	3.0	3.3	HD 2000	850–1100	6 MB	95 W	September 2011	US $177
Core i5	2310	4 (4)	2.9	3.2	HD 2000	850–1100	6 MB	95 W	May 2011	US $177
Core i5	2300	4 (4)	2.8	3.1	HD 2000	850–1100	6 MB	95 W	January 2011	US $177
Core i3	2130	2 (4)	3.4	—N/a	HD 2000	850–1100	3 MB	65 W	September 2011	US $138
Core i3	2125	2 (4)	3.3	—N/a	HD 3000	850–1100	3 MB	65 W	September 2011	US $134
Core i3	2120	2 (4)	3.3	—N/a	HD 2000	850–1100	3 MB	65 W	February 2011	US $138
Core i3	2120T	2 (4)	2.6	—N/a	HD 2000	650–1100	3 MB	35 W	February 2011	US $127
Core i3	2105	2 (4)	3.1	—N/a	HD 3000	850–1100	3 MB	65 W	May 2011	US $134
Core i3	2102	2 (4)	3.1	—N/a	HD 2000	850–1100	3 MB	65 W	Q2 2011	US $127
Core i3	2100	2 (4)	3.1	—N/a	HD 2000	850–1100	3 MB	65 W	February 2011	US $117
Core i3	2100T	2 (4)	2.5	—N/a	HD 2000	650–1100	3 MB	35 W	February 2011	US $127

== Core i (3rd gen), Xeon E3 V2 and Xeon E5 ==
=== Ivy Bridge-DT ===
Common features of Core i (3rd gen) Ivy Bridge-DT desktop processors:

- Socket: LGA 1155.
- Supported chipsets: C216, Z77, Z75, Z68, P67, H67, H77, Q77, Q75, B75, H61.
- All the CPUs support dual-channel DDR3 RAM, at up to 1600 MT/s speed.
- All CPU models provide 16 lanes of PCIe. i5 and up models support it at PCIe 3.0 speeds while i3 models support it at PCIe 2.0 speeds.
- All CPUs feature a DMI 2.0 bus to the chipset (PCH).
- All models support: MMX, SSE, SSE2, SSE3, SSSE3, SSE4.1, SSE4.2, AVX, Intel 64, Intel VT-x
- L1 cache: 64 KB (32 KB data + 32 KB instructions) per core.
- L2 cache: 256 KB per core.
- Fabrication process: 22 nm.
- K-suffix processors have an unlocked multiplier and can be overclocked.
- i3-3220, i5-3550S and i7-3770 are available as embedded processors.

Processor branding	Model	Cores (Threads)	Clock rate (GHz)		Integrated GPU		Smart Cache	TDP	Release date	MSRP
Processor branding	Model	Cores (Threads)	Base	Turbo	Model	Clock (MHz)	Smart Cache	TDP	Release date	MSRP
Core i7	3770K	4 (8)	3.5	3.9	HD 4000	650–1150	8 MB	77 W	April 2012	US $342
Core i7	3770	4 (8)	3.4	3.9	HD 4000	650–1150	8 MB	77 W	April 2012	US $305
Core i7	3770S	4 (8)	3.1	3.9	HD 4000	650–1150	8 MB	65 W	April 2012	US $305
Core i7	3770T	4 (8)	2.5	3.7	HD 4000	650–1150	8 MB	45 W	April 2012	US $294
Core i5	3570K	4 (4)	3.4	3.8	HD 4000	650–1150	6 MB	77 W	April 2012	US $225
Core i5	3570	4 (4)	3.4	3.8	HD 2500	650–1150	6 MB	77 W	June 2012	US $205
Core i5	3570S	4 (4)	3.1	3.8	HD 2500	650–1150	6 MB	65 W	June 2012	US $205
Core i5	3570T	4 (4)	2.3	3.3	HD 2500	650–1150	6 MB	45 W	April 2012	US $205
Core i5	3550	4 (4)	3.3	3.7	HD 2500	650–1150	6 MB	77 W	April 2012	US $205
Core i5	3550S	4 (4)	3.0	3.7	HD 2500	650–1150	6 MB	65 W	April 2012	US $205
Core i5	3470	4 (4)	3.2	3.6	HD 2500	650–1100	6 MB	77 W	June 2012	US $184
Core i5	3475S	4 (4)	2.9	3.6	HD 4000	650–1100	6 MB	65 W	June 2012	US $201
Core i5	3470S	4 (4)	2.9	3.6	HD 2500	650–1100	6 MB	65 W	June 2012	US $184
Core i5	3470T	2 (4)	2.9	3.6	HD 2500	650–1100	3 MB	35 W	June 2012	US $184
Core i5	3450	4 (4)	3.1	3.5	HD 2500	650–1100	6 MB	77 W	April 2012	US $184
Core i5	3450S	4 (4)	2.8	3.5	HD 2500	650–1100	6 MB	65 W	April 2012	US $184
Core i5	3350P	4 (4)	3.1	3.3	—N/a		6 MB	69 W	September 2012	US $177
Core i5	3340	4 (4)	3.1	3.3	HD 2500	650–1050	6 MB	77 W	September 2013	US $182
Core i5	3340S	4 (4)	2.8	3.3	HD 2500	650–1050	6 MB	65 W	September 2013	US $182
Core i5	3330	4 (4)	3.0	3.2	HD 2500	650–1050	6 MB	77 W	September 2012	US $182
Core i5	3335S	4 (4)	2.7	3.2	HD 4000	650–1050	6 MB	65 W	September 2012	US $194
Core i5	3330S	4 (4)	2.7	3.2	HD 2500	650–1050	6 MB	65 W	September 2012	US $177
Core i3	3250	2 (4)	3.5	—N/a	HD 2500	650–1050	3 MB	55 W	June 2013	US $138
Core i3	3250T	2 (4)	3.0	—N/a	HD 2500	650–1050	3 MB	35 W	June 2013	US $138
Core i3	3245	2 (4)	3.4	—N/a	HD 4000	650–1050	3 MB	55 W	June 2013	US $134
Core i3	3240	2 (4)	3.4	—N/a	HD 2500	650–1050	3 MB	55 W	September 2012	US $138
Core i3	3240T	2 (4)	2.9	—N/a	HD 2500	650–1050	3 MB	35 W	September 2012	US $138
Core i3	3225	2 (4)	3.3	—N/a	HD 4000	650–1050	3 MB	55 W	September 2012	US $134
Core i3	3220	2 (4)	3.3	—N/a	HD 2500	650–1050	3 MB	55 W	September 2012	US $117
Core i3	3220T	2 (4)	2.8	—N/a	HD 2500	650–1050	3 MB	35 W	September 2012	US $117
Core i3	3210	2 (4)	3.2	—N/a	HD 2500	650–1050	3 MB	55 W	January 2013	US $117

=== Sandy Bridge-E ===
Common features of Core i (3rd gen) Sandy Bridge-E desktop processors:

- Socket: LGA 2011.
- All CPUs support the X79 chipset.
- All the CPUs support quad-channel DDR3-1600 RAM.
- All CPU models provide 40 lanes of PCIe 2.0.
- All CPUs feature a DMI 2.0 bus to the chipset (PCH).
- All models support: MMX, SSE, SSE2, SSE3, SSSE3, SSE4.1, SSE4.2, AVX, Intel 64, Intel VT-x
- No integrated graphics.
- L1 cache: 64 KB (32 KB data + 32 KB instructions) per core.
- L2 cache: 256 KB per core.
- Fabrication process: 32 nm.
- K-suffix and X-suffix processors have an unlocked multiplier and can be overclocked.

Processor branding	Model	Cores (Threads)	Clock rate (GHz)		Smart Cache	TDP	Release date	MSRP
Processor branding	Model	Cores (Threads)	Base	Turbo	Smart Cache	TDP	Release date	MSRP
Core i7	3970X	6 (12)	3.5	4.0	15 MB	150 W	November 2012	US $999
Core i7	3960X	6 (12)	3.3	3.9	15 MB	130 W	November 2011	US $999
Core i7	3930K	6 (12)	3.2	3.8	12 MB	130 W	November 2011	US $583
Core i7	3820	4 (8)	3.6	3.8	10 MB	130 W	February 2012	US $294

== Core i (4th gen), Xeon E3 V3 and Xeon E5 V2 ==
=== Haswell-DT ===
Intel i3 4130, Haswell 22nm die shot

Common features of Core i (4th gen) Haswell-DT desktop processors:

- Socket: LGA 1150.
- Supported chipsets: C222, C224, C226, H81, B85, Q85, H87, Q87, Z87, H97, Z97.
- All the CPUs support dual-channel DDR3 RAM at up to 1600 MT/s speed.
- All CPU models provide 16 lanes of PCIe 3.0.
- All CPUs feature a DMI 2.0 bus to the chipset (PCH).
- All models support: MMX, SSE, SSE2, SSE3, SSSE3, SSE4.1, SSE4.2, AVX, AVX2, FMA3, Intel 64, Intel VT-x
- L1 cache: 64 KB (32 KB data + 32 KB instructions) per core.
- L2 cache: 256 KB per core.
- Fabrication process: 22 nm.
- K-suffix processors have an unlocked multiplier and can be overclocked.
- The following models are available as embedded processors: i3- 4330, 4350T, 4360, i5- 4570S, 4590T, 4590S, i7- 4770S, 4790S.

Processor branding	Model	Cores (Threads)	Clock rate (GHz)		Integrated GPU		Smart Cache	TDP	Release date	MSRP
Processor branding	Model	Cores (Threads)	Base	Turbo	Model	Clock (MHz)	Smart Cache	TDP	Release date	MSRP
Core i7	4790K	4 (8)	4.0	4.4	HD 4600	350–1250	8 MB	88 W	June 2014	US $350
Core i7	4790	4 (8)	3.6	4.0	HD 4600	350–1200	8 MB	84 W	May 2014	US $312
Core i7	4790S	4 (8)	3.2	4.0	HD 4600	350–1200	8 MB	65 W	May 2014	US $312
Core i7	4790T	4 (8)	2.7	3.9	HD 4600	350–1200	8 MB	45 W	May 2014	US $303
Core i7	4785T	4 (8)	2.2	3.2	HD 4600	350–1200	8 MB	35 W	May 2014	US $303
Core i7	4770K	4 (8)	3.5	3.9	HD 4600	350–1250	8 MB	84 W	June 2013	US $350
Core i7	4771	4 (8)	3.5	3.9	HD 4600	350–1200	8 MB	84 W	September 2013	US $320
Core i7	4770	4 (8)	3.4	3.9	HD 4600	350–1200	8 MB	84 W	June 2013	US $312
Core i7	4770S	4 (8)	3.1	3.9	HD 4600	350–1200	8 MB	65 W	June 2013	US $305
Core i7	4770T	4 (8)	2.5	3.7	HD 4600	350–1200	8 MB	45 W	June 2013	US $303
Core i7	4765T	4 (8)	2.0	3.0	HD 4600	350–1200	8 MB	35 W	June 2013	US $303
Core i5	4690K	4 (4)	3.5	3.9	HD 4600	350–1200	6 MB	88 W	June 2014	US $242
Core i5	4690	4 (4)	3.5	3.9	HD 4600	350–1200	6 MB	84 W	May 2014	US $213
Core i5	4690S	4 (4)	3.2	3.9	HD 4600	350–1200	6 MB	65 W	May 2014	US $213
Core i5	4690T	4 (4)	2.5	3.5	HD 4600	350–1200	6 MB	45 W	May 2014	US $213
Core i5	4670K	4 (4)	3.4	3.8	HD 4600	350–1200	6 MB	84 W	June 2013	US $242
Core i5	4670	4 (4)	3.4	3.8	HD 4600	350–1200	6 MB	84 W	June 2013	US $213
Core i5	4670S	4 (4)	3.1	3.8	HD 4600	350–1200	6 MB	65 W	June 2013	US $213
Core i5	4670T	4 (4)	2.3	3.3	HD 4600	350–1200	6 MB	45 W	June 2013	US $213
Core i5	4590	4 (4)	3.3	3.7	HD 4600	350–1150	6 MB	84 W	May 2014	US $192
Core i5	4590S	4 (4)	3.0	3.7	HD 4600	350–1150	6 MB	65 W	May 2014	US $192
Core i5	4590T	4 (4)	2.0	3.0	HD 4600	350–1150	6 MB	35 W	May 2014	US $192
Core i5	4570	4 (4)	3.2	3.6	HD 4600	350–1150	6 MB	84 W	June 2013	US $192
Core i5	4570S	4 (4)	2.9	3.6	HD 4600	350–1150	6 MB	65 W	June 2013	US $192
Core i5	4570T	2 (4)	2.9	3.6	HD 4600	200–1150	4 MB	35 W	June 2013	US $192
Core i5	4470	4 (4)	3.3	3.5	HD 4600	350–1100	6 MB	84 W	May 2014	OEM
Core i5	4460	4 (4)	3.2	3.4	HD 4600	350–1100	6 MB	84 W	May 2014	US $182
Core i5	4460S	4 (4)	2.9	3.4	HD 4600	350–1100	6 MB	65 W	May 2014	US $182
Core i5	4460T	4 (4)	1.9	2.7	HD 4600	350–1100	6 MB	35 W	March 2014	US $182
Core i5	4440	4 (4)	3.1	3.3	HD 4600	350–1100	6 MB	84 W	September 2013	US $182
Core i5	4440S	4 (4)	2.8	3.3	HD 4600	350–1100	6 MB	65 W	September 2013	US $182
Core i5	4430	4 (4)	3.0	3.2	HD 4600	350–1100	6 MB	84 W	June 2013	US $182
Core i5	4430S	4 (4)	2.7	3.2	HD 4600	350–1100	6 MB	65 W	June 2013	US $182
Core i3	4370	2 (4)	3.8	—N/a	HD 4600	350–1150	4 MB	54 W	July 2014	US $149
Core i3	4370T	2 (4)	3.3	—N/a	HD 4600	200–1150	4 MB	35 W	March 2015	US $138
Core i3	4360	2 (4)	3.7	—N/a	HD 4600	350–1150	4 MB	54 W	May 2014	US $149
Core i3	4360T	2 (4)	3.2	—N/a	HD 4600	200–1150	4 MB	35 W	July 2014	US $138
Core i3	4350	2 (4)	3.6	—N/a	HD 4600	350–1150	4 MB	54 W	May 2014	US $138
Core i3	4350T	2 (4)	3.1	—N/a	HD 4600	200–1150	4 MB	35 W	May 2014	US $138
Core i3	4340	2 (4)	3.6	—N/a	HD 4600	350–1150	4 MB	54 W	September 2013	US $149
Core i3	4330	2 (4)	3.5	—N/a	HD 4600	350–1150	4 MB	54 W	September 2013	US $138
Core i3	4330T	2 (4)	3.0	—N/a	HD 4600	200–1150	4 MB	35 W	September 2013	US $138
Core i3	4170	2 (4)	3.7	—N/a	HD 4400	350–1150	3 MB	54 W	March 2015	US $117
Core i3	4170T	2 (4)	3.2	—N/a	HD 4400	200–1150	3 MB	35 W	March 2015	US $117
Core i3	4160	2 (4)	3.6	—N/a	HD 4400	350–1150	3 MB	54 W	July 2014	US $117
Core i3	4160T	2 (4)	3.1	—N/a	HD 4400	200–1150	3 MB	35 W	July 2014	US $117
Core i3	4150	2 (4)	3.5	—N/a	HD 4400	350–1150	3 MB	54 W	May 2014	US $117
Core i3	4150T	2 (4)	3.0	—N/a	HD 4400	200–1150	3 MB	35 W	May 2014	US $117
Core i3	4130	2 (4)	3.4	—N/a	HD 4400	350–1150	3 MB	54 W	September 2013	US $122
Core i3	4130T	2 (4)	2.9	—N/a	HD 4400	200–1150	3 MB	35 W	September 2013	US $122

=== Haswell-H ===
Common features of Core i (4th gen) Haswell-H desktop processors:

- Socket: BGA 1364 (soldered).
- Supported chipsets: H97, Z97.
- All the CPUs support dual-channel DDR3 RAM, at up to 1600 MT/s speed.
- All CPU models provide 16 lanes of PCIe 3.0.
- All CPUs feature a DMI 2.0 bus to the chipset (PCH).
- All models support: MMX, SSE, SSE2, SSE3, SSSE3, SSE4.1, SSE4.2, AVX, AVX2, FMA3, Intel 64, Intel VT-x
- L1 cache: 64 KB (32 KB data + 32 KB instructions) per core.
- L2 cache: 256 KB per core.
- In addition to the Smart Cache (L3 cache), Haswell-H CPUs also contain 128 MB of eDRAM acting as L4 cache.
- Fabrication process: 22 nm.

Processor branding	Model	Cores (Threads)	Clock rate (GHz)		Integrated GPU		Smart Cache	TDP	Release date
Processor branding	Model	Cores (Threads)	Base	Turbo	Model	Clock (MHz)	Smart Cache	TDP	Release date
Core i7	4770R	4 (8)	3.2	3.9	Iris Pro 5200	200–1300	6 MB	65 W	June 2013
Core i5	4670R	4 (4)	3.0	3.7	Iris Pro 5200	200–1300	4 MB	65 W	June 2013
Core i5	4570R	4 (4)	2.7	3.2	Iris Pro 5200	200–1150	4 MB	65 W	June 2013

=== Ivy Bridge-E ===
Common features of Core i (4th gen) Ivy Bridge-E desktop processors:

- Socket: LGA 2011.
- All CPUs support the X79 chipset.
- All the CPUs support quad-channel DDR3-1866 RAM.
- All CPU models provide 40 lanes of PCIe 3.0.
- All CPUs feature a DMI 2.0 bus to the chipset (PCH).
- All models support: MMX, SSE, SSE2, SSE3, SSSE3, SSE4.1, SSE4.2, AVX, AVX2, FMA3, Intel 64, Intel VT-x
- No integrated graphics.
- L1 cache: 64 KB (32 KB data + 32 KB instructions) per core.
- L2 cache: 256 KB per core.
- Fabrication process: 22 nm.
- K-suffix and X-suffix processors have an unlocked multiplier and can be overclocked.

Processor branding	Model	Cores (Threads)	Clock rate (GHz)		Smart Cache	TDP	Release date	MSRP
Processor branding	Model	Cores (Threads)	Base	Turbo	Smart Cache	TDP	Release date	MSRP
Core i7	4960X	6 (12)	3.6	4.0	15 MB	130 W	September 2013	US $990
Core i7	4930K	6 (12)	3.4	3.9	12 MB	130 W	September 2013	US $555
Core i7	4820K	4 (8)	3.7	3.9	10 MB	130 W	September 2013	US $310

== Core i (5th gen), Xeon E3 V4 and Xeon E5 V3 ==
=== Broadwell-H ===
Common features of Core i (5th gen) Broadwell-H desktop processors:

- Socket: LGA 1150 for C-suffix processors, BGA 1364 soldered for R-suffix.
- Supported chipsets: H97, Z97, C226
- All the CPUs support dual-channel DDR3 RAM. C-suffix processors support it at speeds up to 1600 MT/s, while R-suffix support it at 1866 MT/s.
- All CPU models provide 16 lanes of PCIe 3.0.
- All CPUs feature a DMI 2.0 bus to the chipset (PCH).
- All models support: MMX, SSE, SSE2, SSE3, SSSE3, SSE4.1, SSE4.2, AVX, AVX2, FMA3, Intel 64, Intel VT-x
- L1 cache: 64 KB (32 KB data + 32 KB instructions) per core.
- L2 cache: 256 KB per core.
- In addition to the Smart Cache (L3 cache), Broadwell-H CPUs also contain 128 MB of eDRAM acting as L4 cache.
- Fabrication process: 14 nm.
- C-suffix processors supports Unlocked Multiplier.

Processor branding	Model	Cores (Threads)	Clock rate (GHz)		Integrated GPU		Smart Cache	TDP	Release date	MSRP
Processor branding	Model	Cores (Threads)	Base	Turbo	Model	Clock (MHz)	Smart Cache	TDP	Release date	MSRP
Core i7	5775R	4 (8)	3.3	3.8	Iris Pro 6200	300–1150	6 MB	65 W	June 2015	OEM
Core i7	5775C	4 (8)	3.3	3.7	Iris Pro 6200	300–1150	6 MB	65 W	June 2015	US $366
Core i5	5675R	4 (4)	3.1	3.6	Iris Pro 6200	300–1100	4 MB	65 W	June 2015	OEM
Core i5	5675C	4 (4)	3.1	3.6	Iris Pro 6200	300–1100	4 MB	65 W	June 2015	US $276
Core i5	5575R	4 (4)	2.8	3.3	Iris Pro 6200	300–1050	4 MB	65 W	June 2015	OEM

=== Haswell-E ===
Common features of Core i (5th gen) Haswell-E desktop processors:

- Socket: LGA 2011-3.
- All CPUs support the X99 chipset.
- All the CPUs support quad-channel DDR4-2133 RAM.
- i7-5820K provides 28 lanes of PCIe 3.0; i7-5930K and 5960X provide 40 lanes of PCIe 3.0.
- All CPUs feature a DMI 2.0 bus to the chipset (PCH).
- All models support: MMX, SSE, SSE2, SSE3, SSSE3, SSE4.1, SSE4.2, AVX, AVX2, FMA3, Intel 64, Intel VT-x
- No integrated graphics.
- L1 cache: 64 KB (32 KB data + 32 KB instructions) per core.
- L2 cache: 256 KB per core.
- Fabrication process: 22 nm.
- K-suffix and X-suffix processors have an unlocked multiplier and can be overclocked.

Processor branding	Model	Cores (Threads)	Clock rate (GHz)		Smart Cache	TDP	Release date	MSRP
Processor branding	Model	Cores (Threads)	Base	Turbo	Smart Cache	TDP	Release date	MSRP
Core i7	5960X	8 (16)	3.0	3.5	20 MB	140 W	August 2014	US $999
Core i7	5930K	6 (12)	3.5	3.7	15 MB	140 W	August 2014	US $583
Core i7	5820K	6 (12)	3.3	3.6	15 MB	140 W	August 2014	US $389

== Core i (6th gen), Xeon E3 V5 and Xeon E5 V4 ==
=== Skylake-S ===
Common features of Core i (6th gen) Skylake-S desktop processors:

- Socket: LGA 1151.
- Supported chipsets: B150, C236, H110, H170, Q150, Q170 and C232.
- All the CPUs support dual-channel DDR4-2133 or DDR3L-1600 RAM.
- All CPU models provide 16 lanes of PCIe 3.0.
- All CPUs feature a DMI 3.0 bus to the chipset (PCH).
- All models support: MMX, SSE, SSE2, SSE3, SSSE3, SSE4.1, SSE4.2, AVX, AVX2, FMA3, Intel 64, Intel VT-x
- L1 cache: 64 KB (32 KB data + 32 KB instructions) per core.
- L2 cache: 256 KB per core.
- Fabrication process: 14 nm.
- K-suffix processors have an unlocked multiplier and can be overclocked.

Processor branding	Model	Cores (Threads)	Clock rate (GHz)		Integrated GPU		Smart Cache	TDP	Release date	MSRP
Processor branding	Model	Cores (Threads)	Base	Turbo	Model	Clock (MHz)	Smart Cache	TDP	Release date	MSRP
Core i7	6700K	4 (8)	4.0	4.2	HD 530	350–1150	8 MB	91 W	August 2015	US $339
Core i7	6700	4 (8)	3.4	4.0	HD 530	350–1150	8 MB	65 W	September 2015	US $303
Core i7	6700T	4 (8)	2.8	3.6	HD 530	350–1100	8 MB	35 W	September 2015	US $303
Core i5	6600K	4 (4)	3.5	3.9	HD 530	350–1150	6 MB	91 W	August 2015	US $243
Core i5	6600	4 (4)	3.3	3.9	HD 530	350–1150	6 MB	65 W	September 2015	US $213
Core i5	6600T	4 (4)	2.7	3.5	HD 530	350–1100	6 MB	35 W	September 2015	US $213
Core i5	6500	4 (4)	3.2	3.6	HD 530	350–1050	6 MB	65 W	September 2015	US $192
Core i5	6500T	4 (4)	2.5	3.1	HD 530	350–1100	6 MB	35 W	September 2015	US $192
Core i5	6402P	4 (4)	2.8	3.4	HD 510	350–950	6 MB	65 W	December 2015	US $182
Core i5	6400	4 (4)	2.7	3.3	HD 530	350–950	6 MB	65 W	September 2015	US $182
Core i5	6400T	4 (4)	2.2	2.8	HD 530	350–950	6 MB	35 W	September 2015	US $182
Core i3	6320	2 (4)	3.9	—N/a	HD 530	350–1150	4 MB	51 W	September 2015	US $148
Core i3	6300	2 (4)	3.8	—N/a	HD 530	350–1150	4 MB	51 W	September 2015	US $139
Core i3	6300T	2 (4)	3.3	—N/a	HD 530	350–950	4 MB	35 W	September 2015	US $138
Core i3	6100	2 (4)	3.7	—N/a	HD 530	350–1050	3 MB	51 W	September 2015	US $117
Core i3	6100T	2 (4)	3.2	—N/a	HD 530	350–950	3 MB	35 W	September 2015	US $117
Core i3	6098P	2 (4)	3.6	—N/a	HD 510	350–1050	3 MB	54 W	December 2015	US $117

=== Skylake-H ===
Common features of Core i (6th gen) Skylake-H desktop processors:

- Socket: BGA 1440 (soldered).
- Supported chipsets: B150, C236, H110, H170, Q150, Q170.
- All the CPUs support dual-channel DDR4-2133 or DDR3L-1600 RAM.
- All CPU models provide 16 lanes of PCIe 3.0.
- All CPUs feature a DMI 3.0 bus to the chipset (PCH).
- All models support: MMX, SSE, SSE2, SSE3, SSSE3, SSE4.1, SSE4.2, AVX, AVX2, FMA3, Intel 64, Intel VT-x
- L1 cache: 64 KB (32 KB data + 32 KB instructions) per core.
- L2 cache: 256 KB per core.
- In addition to the Smart Cache (L3 cache), Skylake-H CPUs also contain 128 MB of eDRAM acting as L4 cache.
- Fabrication process: 14 nm.

Processor branding	Model	Cores (Threads)	Clock rate (GHz)		Integrated GPU		Smart Cache	TDP	Release date
Processor branding	Model	Cores (Threads)	Base	Turbo	Model	Clock (MHz)	Smart Cache	TDP	Release date
Core i7	6785R	4 (8)	3.3	3.9	Iris Pro 580	350–1150	8 MB	65 W	May 2016
Core i5	6685R	4 (4)	3.2	3.8	Iris Pro 580	350–1150	6 MB	65 W	May 2016
Core i5	6585R	4 (4)	2.8	3.6	Iris Pro 580	350–1100	6 MB	65 W	May 2016

=== Broadwell-E ===
Common features of Core i (6th gen) Broadwell-E desktop processors:

- Socket: LGA 2011-3.
- All CPUs support the X99 chipset.
- All the CPUs support quad-channel DDR4-2400 RAM.
- i7-6800K provides 28 lanes of PCIe 3.0; all other models provide 40 lanes of PCIe 3.0.
- All CPUs feature a DMI 2.0 bus to the chipset (PCH).
- All models support: MMX, SSE, SSE2, SSE3, SSSE3, SSE4.1, SSE4.2, AVX, AVX2, FMA3, Intel 64, Intel VT-x
- No integrated graphics.
- L1 cache: 64 KB (32 KB data + 32 KB instructions) per core.
- L2 cache: 256 KB per core.
- Fabrication process: 14 nm.
- K-suffix and X-suffix processors have an unlocked multiplier and can be overclocked.

Processor branding	Model	Cores (Threads)	Clock rate (GHz)		Smart Cache	TDP	Release date	MSRP
Processor branding	Model	Cores (Threads)	Base	Turbo	Smart Cache	TDP	Release date	MSRP
Core i7	6950X	10 (20)	3.0	3.5	25 MB	140 W	May 2016	US $1723
Core i7	6900K	8 (16)	3.2	3.7	20 MB	140 W	May 2016	US $1089
Core i7	6850K	6 (12)	3.6	3.8	15 MB	140 W	May 2016	US $617
Core i7	6800K	6 (12)	3.4	3.8	15 MB	140 W	May 2016	US $434

== Core i (7th gen), Xeon E3 V6 and Xeon W-2100 ==
=== Kaby Lake-S ===
Common features of Core i (7th gen) Kaby Lake-S desktop processors:

- Socket: LGA 1151.
- Supported chipsets: B250, C236, H270, Q250, Q270, Z270.
- All the CPUs support dual-channel DDR4-2400 or DDR3L-1600 RAM.
- All CPU models provide 16 lanes of PCIe 3.0.
- All CPUs feature a DMI 3.0 bus to the chipset (PCH).
- All models support: MMX, SSE, SSE2, SSE3, SSSE3, SSE4.1, SSE4.2, AVX, AVX2, FMA3, Intel 64, Intel VT-x
- L1 cache: 64 KB (32 KB data + 32 KB instructions) per core.
- L2 cache: 256 KB per core.
- Fabrication process: 14 nm.
- K-suffix processors have an unlocked multiplier and can be overclocked.

Processor branding	Model	Cores (Threads)	Clock rate (GHz)		Integrated GPU		Smart Cache	TDP	Release date	MSRP
Processor branding	Model	Cores (Threads)	Base	Turbo	Model	Clock (MHz)	Smart Cache	TDP	Release date	MSRP
Core i7	7700K	4 (8)	4.2	4.5	HD 630	350–1150	8 MB	91 W	January 2017	US $339
Core i7	7700	4 (8)	3.6	4.2	HD 630	350–1150	8 MB	65 W	January 2017	US $303
Core i7	7700T	4 (8)	2.9	3.8	HD 630	350–1150	8 MB	35 W	January 2017	US $303
Core i5	7600K	4 (4)	3.8	4.2	HD 630	350–1150	6 MB	91 W	January 2017	US $242
Core i5	7600	4 (4)	3.5	4.1	HD 630	350–1150	6 MB	65 W	January 2017	US $213
Core i5	7600T	4 (4)	2.8	3.7	HD 630	350–1100	6 MB	35 W	January 2017	US $213
Core i5	7500	4 (4)	3.4	3.8	HD 630	350–1100	6 MB	65 W	January 2017	US $192
Core i5	7500T	4 (4)	2.7	3.3	HD 630	350–1100	6 MB	35 W	January 2017	US $192
Core i5	7400	4 (4)	3.0	3.5	HD 630	350–1000	6 MB	65 W	January 2017	US $182
Core i5	7400T	4 (4)	2.4	3.0	HD 630	350–1000	6 MB	35 W	January 2017	US $182
Core i3	7350K	2 (4)	4.2	—N/a	HD 630	350–1150	4 MB	60 W	January 2017	US $168
Core i3	7320	2 (4)	4.1	—N/a	HD 630	350–1150	4 MB	51 W	January 2017	US $157
Core i3	7300	2 (4)	4.0	—N/a	HD 630	350–1150	4 MB	51 W	January 2017	US $147
Core i3	7300T	2 (4)	3.5	—N/a	HD 630	350–1100	4 MB	35 W	January 2017	US $147
Core i3	7100	2 (4)	3.9	—N/a	HD 630	350–1100	3 MB	51 W	January 2017	US $117
Core i3	7100T	2 (4)	3.4	—N/a	HD 630	350–1100	3 MB	35 W	January 2017	US $117

=== Skylake-X ===
Common features of Core i (7th gen) Skylake-X desktop processors:

- Socket: LGA 2066.
- All CPUs support the X299 chipset.
- All the CPUs support quad-channel DDR4-2400 RAM. Models i7-7820X and above support it up to 2666 MT/s speeds.
- i7 models provide 28 lanes of PCIe 3.0; i9 models provide 44 lanes of PCIe 3.0.
- All CPUs feature a DMI 3.0 bus to the chipset (PCH).
- All models support: MMX, SSE, SSE2, SSE3, SSSE3, SSE4.1, SSE4.2, AVX, AVX2, AVX-512, FMA3, Intel 64, Intel VT-x
- No integrated graphics.
- L1 cache: 64 KB (32 KB data + 32 KB instructions) per core.
- L2 cache: 1 MB per core.
- Fabrication process: 14 nm.
- X-suffix, and XE-suffix processors have an unlocked multiplier and can be overclocked.

Processor branding	Model	Cores (Threads)	Clock rate (GHz)			Smart Cache	TDP	Release date	MSRP
Processor branding	Model	Cores (Threads)	Base	Turbo 2.0	Turbo 3.0	Smart Cache	TDP	Release date	MSRP
Core i9	7980XE	18 (36)	2.6	4.2	4.4	24.75 MB	165 W	September 2017	US $1999
Core i9	7960X	16 (32)	2.8	4.2	4.4	22 MB	165 W	September 2017	US $1699
Core i9	7940X	14 (28)	3.1	4.3	4.4	19.25 MB	165 W	September 2017	US $1399
Core i9	7920X	12 (24)	2.9	4.3	4.4	16.5 MB	140 W	August 2017	US $1199
Core i9	7900X	10 (20)	3.3	4.3	4.5	13.75 MB	140 W	June 2017	US $989
Core i7	7820X	8 (16)	3.6	4.3	4.5	11 MB	140 W	June 2017	US $599
Core i7	7800X	6 (12)	3.5	4.0	—N/a	8.25 MB	140 W	June 2017	US $389

=== Kaby Lake-X ===
Common features of Core i (7th gen) Kaby Lake-X desktop processors:

- Socket: LGA 2066.
- All CPUs support the X299 chipset.
- All the CPUs support dual-channel DDR4-2666 RAM.
- All CPU models provide 16 lanes of PCIe 3.0.
- All CPUs feature a DMI 3.0 bus to the chipset (PCH).
- All models support: MMX, SSE, SSE2, SSE3, SSSE3, SSE4.1, SSE4.2, AVX, AVX2, FMA3, Intel 64, Intel VT-x
- No integrated graphics.
- L1 cache: 64 KB (32 KB data + 32 KB instructions) per core.
- L2 cache: 256 KB per core.
- Fabrication process: 14 nm.
- X-suffix processors have an unlocked multiplier and can be overclocked.

Processor branding	Model	Cores (Threads)	Clock rate (GHz)		Smart Cache	TDP	Release date	MSRP
Processor branding	Model	Cores (Threads)	Base	Turbo	Smart Cache	TDP	Release date	MSRP
Core i7	7740X	4 (8)	4.3	4.5	8 MB	112 W	June 2017	US $339
Core i5	7640X	4 (4)	4.0	4.2	6 MB	112 W	June 2017	US $242

== Core i (8th gen) and Xeon E-2100 ==
=== Coffee Lake-S ===
Common features of Core i (8th gen) desktop processors:

- Socket: LGA 1151-2.
- Supported chipsets: B360, H310, H370, Q370, Z370, Z390, C242, C246. (Xeon E only supports C242 and C246 chipset)
- All the CPUs support dual-channel DDR4 RAM at up to 2400 MT/s speed. Models i5 and up support it at up to 2666 MT/s speed.
- All CPU models provide 16 lanes of PCIe 3.0.
- All CPUs feature a DMI 3.0 bus to the chipset (PCH).
- All models support: MMX, SSE, SSE2, SSE3, SSSE3, SSE4.1, SSE4.2, AVX, AVX2, FMA3, Intel 64, Intel VT-x
- L1 cache: 64 KB (32 KB data + 32 KB instructions) per core.
- L2 cache: 256 KB per core.
- Fabrication process: 14 nm.
- K-suffix processors have an unlocked multiplier and can be overclocked.

Processor branding	Model	sSpec Number	Stepping	Cores (Threads)	Clock rate (GHz)		Integrated GPU		Smart Cache	TDP	Release date	MSRP
Processor branding	Model	sSpec Number	Stepping	Cores (Threads)	Base	Turbo	Model	Clock (MHz)	Smart Cache	TDP	Release date	MSRP
Core i7	8086K	SRCX5	U0	6 (12)	4.0	5.0	UHD 630	350–1200	12 MB	95 W	June 2018	US $425
Xeon E	2186G	SR3WR	U0	6 (12)	3.8	4.7	UHD P630	350–1200	12 MB	95 W	July 2018	US $506
Xeon E	2176G	SR3WS	U0	6 (12)	3.7	4.7	UHD P630	350–1200	12 MB	80 W	July 2018	US $406
Core i7	8700K	SR3QR	U0	6 (12)	3.7	4.7	UHD 630	350–1200	12 MB	95 W	October 2017	US $359
Xeon E	2146G	SR3WT	U0	6 (12)	3.5	4.5	UHD P630	350–1200	12 MB	80 W	July 2018	US $311-317
Xeon E	2136	SR3WW	U0	6 (12)	3.3	4.5	—N/a		12 MB	80 W	July 2018	US $319
Core i7	8700	SR3QS	U0	6 (12)	3.2	4.6	UHD 630	350–1200	12 MB	65 W	October 2017	US $303
Core i7	8700T	SR3WX	U0	6 (12)	2.4	4.0	UHD 630	350–1200	12 MB	35 W	April 2018	US $303
Core i5	8600K	SR3QU	U0	6 (6)	3.6	4.3	UHD 630	350–1150	9 MB	95 W	October 2017	US $257
Xeon E	2126G	SR3WU	U0	6 (6)	3.3	4.5	UHD P630	350–1150	12 MB	80 W	July 2018	US $286
Core i5	8600	SR3X0	U0	6 (6)	3.1	4.3	UHD 630	350–1150	9 MB	65 W	April 2018	US $213
Core i5	8600T	SR3X3	U0	6 (6)	2.3	3.7	UHD 630	350–1150	9 MB	35 W	April 2018	US $213
Core i5	8500	SR3XE	U0	6 (6)	3.0	4.1	UHD 630	350–1100	9 MB	65 W	April 2018	US $192
Core i5	8500T	SR3XD	U0	6 (6)	2.1	3.5	UHD 630	350–1100	9 MB	35 W	April 2018	US $192
Core i5	8400	SR3QT	U0	6 (6)	2.8	4.0	UHD 630	350–1050	9 MB	65 W	October 2017	US $182
Core i5	8400T	SR3X6	U0	6 (6)	1.7	3.3	UHD 630	350–1050	9 MB	35 W	April 2018	US $182
Xeon E	2174G	SR3WN	U0	4 (8)	3.8	4.7	UHD P630	350–1200	8 MB	71 W	June 2018	US $370
Xeon E	2144G	SR3WM	U0	4 (8)	3.6	4.5	UHD P630	350–1200	8 MB	71 W	June 2018	US $272
Xeon E	2134	SR3WP	U0	4 (8)	3.5	4.5	—N/a		8 MB	71 W	June 2018	US $250-256
Core i3	8350K	SR3N4	B0	4 (4)	4.0	—N/a	UHD 630	350–1150	8 MB	91 W	October 2017	US $168
Xeon E	2124G	SR3WL	U0	4 (4)	3.4	4.5	UHD P630	350–1150	8 MB	71 W	July 2018	US $245-249
Xeon E	2124	SR3WQ	U0	4 (4)	3.3	4.3	—N/a		8 MB	71 W	July 2018	US $193-198
Xeon E	2104G	SR3WV	U0	4 (4)	3.2	—N/a	UHD P630	350-1150	8 MB	65 W	July 2018	US $193
Core i3	8300	SR3XY	B0	4 (4)	3.7	—N/a	UHD 630	350-1150	8 MB	62 W	April 2018	US $138
Core i3	8300T	SR3Y1	B0	4 (4)	3.2	—N/a	UHD 630	350–1100	8 MB	35 W	April 2018	US $138
Core i3	8100	SR3N5	B0	4 (4)	3.6	—N/a	UHD 630	350–1100	6 MB	65 W	October 2017	US $117
Core i3	8100F	SR3XL	B0	4 (4)	3.6	—N/a	—N/a		6 MB	65 W	January 2019	US $117
Core i3	8100T	SR3Y8	B0	4 (4)	3.1	—N/a	UHD 630	350–1100	6 MB	35 W	April 2018	US $117
Pentium Gold	G5600	SR3YB	B0	2 (4)	3.9	—N/a	UHD 630	350–1100	4 MB	54 W	April 2018	US $86
Pentium Gold	G5500	SR3YD	B0	2 (4)	3.8	—N/a	UHD 630	350–1100	4 MB	54 W	April 2018	US $75
Pentium Gold	G5400	SR3X9	U0	2 (4)	3.7	—N/a	UHD 610	350–1050	4 MB	54 W	April 2018	US $64
Pentium Gold	G5500T	SR3YE	B0	2 (4)	3.2	—N/a	UHD 630	350–1050	4 MB	35 W	April 2018	US $75
Pentium Gold	G5400T	SR3XB	U0	2 (4)	3.1	—N/a	UHD 610	350–1050	4 MB	35 W	April 2018	US $64
Celeron	G4920	SR3YL	B0	2 (2)	3.2	—N/a	UHD 610	350–1050	2 MB	54 W	April 2018	US $52
Celeron	G4900	SR3W4	B0	2 (2)	3.1	—N/a	UHD 610	350–1050	2 MB	54 W	April 2018	US $42
Celeron	G4900T	SR3YP	B0	2 (2)	2.9	—N/a	UHD 610	350–1000	2 MB	35 W	April 2018	US $42

== Core i (9th gen) and Xeon E-2200 ==
=== Coffee Lake-R ===
Common features of Core i (9th gen) Coffee Lake-R desktop processors:

- Socket: LGA 1151-2.
- Supported chipsets: B360, H310, H310C, B365, H370, Q370, Z370, Z390, C242, C246. (Xeon E only supports C242 and C246 chipset)
- All the CPUs support dual-channel DDR4 RAM at up to 2400 MT/s speed. Core Models i5 and up and Xeon Models support it at up to 2667 MT/s speed.
- All CPU models provide 16 lanes of PCIe 3.0.
- All CPUs feature a DMI 3.0 bus to the chipset (PCH).
- All models support: MMX, SSE, SSE2, SSE3, SSSE3, SSE4.1, SSE4.2, AVX, AVX2, FMA3, Intel 64, Intel VT-x
- L1 cache: 64 KB (32 KB data + 32 KB instructions) per core.
- L2 cache: 256 KB per core.
- Fabrication process: 14 nm.
- K-suffix processors have an unlocked multiplier and can be overclocked.
- i9-9900KS has all-core boost clock of 5.0 GHz.

Processor branding	Model	sSpec Number	Stepping	Cores (Threads)	Clock rate (GHz)		Integrated GPU		Smart Cache	TDP	Release date	MSRP
Processor branding	Model	sSpec Number	Stepping	Cores (Threads)	Base	Turbo	Model	Clock (MHz)	Smart Cache	TDP	Release date	MSRP
Core i9	9900KS	SRG1Q	R0	8 (16)	4.0	5.0	UHD 630	350–1200	16 MB	127 W	October 2019	US $524
Xeon E	2288G	SRFB3	R0	8 (16)	3.7	5.0	UHD P630	350–1200	16 MB	95 W	May 2019	US $539
Core i9	9900K	SRG19	R0	8 (16)	3.6	5.0	UHD 630	350–1200	16 MB	95 W	October 2018	US $488
Core i9	9900K	SRELS	P0	8 (16)	3.6	5.0	UHD 630	350–1200	16 MB	95 W	October 2018	US $488
Core i9	9900KF	SRG1A	R0	8 (16)	3.6	5.0	—N/a		16 MB	95 W	January 2019	US $463
Core i9	9900KF	SRFAA	P0	8 (16)	3.6	5.0	—N/a		16 MB	95 W	January 2019	US $463
Intel Processor	CC150	SRFBT	R0	8 (16)	3.5	—N/a	—N/a		16 MB	95 W	GEFORCE NOW	NVIDIA
Xeon E	2278G	SRFB2	R0	8 (16)	3.4	5.0	UHD P630	350–1200	16 MB	80 W	May 2019	US $494
Core i9	9900	SRG18	R0	8 (16)	3.1	5.0	UHD 630	350–1200	16 MB	65 W	April 2019	US $439
Core i9	9900T	SRG1B	R0	8 (16)	2.1	4.4	UHD 630	350–1200	16 MB	35 W	April 2019	US $439
Core i7	9700K	SRG15	R0	8 (8)	3.6	4.9	UHD 630	350–1200	12 MB	95 W	October 2018	US $374
Core i7	9700K	SRELT	P0	8 (8)	3.6	4.9	UHD 630	350–1200	12 MB	95 W	October 2018	US $374
Core i7	9700KF	SRG16	R0	8 (8)	3.6	4.9	—N/a		12 MB	95 W	January 2019	US $374
Core i7	9700KF	SRFAC	P0	8 (8)	3.6	4.9	—N/a		12 MB	95 W	January 2019	US $374
Core i7	9700	SRG13	R0	8 (8)	3.0	4.7	UHD 630	350–1200	12 MB	65 W	April 2019	US $323
Core i7	9700F	SRG14	R0	8 (8)	3.0	4.7	—N/a		12 MB	65 W	April 2019	US $323
Core i7	9700T	SRG17	R0	8 (8)	2.0	4.3	UHD 630	350–1200	12 MB	35 W	April 2019	US $323
Xeon E	2286G	SRF7C	U0	6 (12)	4.0	4.9	UHD P630	350–1200	12 MB	95 W	May 2019	US $450
Xeon E	2276G	SRF7M	U0	6 (12)	3.8	4.9	UHD P630	350–1200	12 MB	80 W	May 2019	US $362
Xeon E	2246G	SRF7N	U0	6 (12)	3.6	4.8	UHD P630	350–1200	12 MB	80 W	May 2019	US $350
Xeon E	2236	SRF7G	U0	6 (12)	3.4	4.8	—N/a		12 MB	80 W	May 2019	US $319
Core i5	9600K	SRG11	R0	6 (6)	3.7	4.6	UHD 630	350–1150	9 MB	95 W	October 2018	US $262
Core i5	9600K	SRELU	P0	6 (6)	3.7	4.6	UHD 630	350–1150	9 MB	95 W	October 2018	US $262
Core i5	9600KF	SRG12	R0	6 (6)	3.7	4.6	—N/a		9 MB	95 W	January 2019	US $263
Core i5	9600KF	SRFAD	P0	6 (6)	3.7	4.6	—N/a		9 MB	95 W	January 2019	US $263
Xeon E	2226G	SRF7F	U0	6 (6)	3.4	4.7	UHD P630	350–1200	12 MB	80 W	May 2019	US $286
Core i5	9600	SRF4H	U0	6 (6)	3.1	4.6	UHD 630	350–1150	9 MB	65 W	April 2019	US $213
Core i5	9600T	SRF4F	U0	6 (6)	2.3	3.9	UHD 630	350–1150	9 MB	35 W	April 2019	US $213
Core i5	9500	SRF4B	U0	6 (6)	3.0	4.4	UHD 630	350–1100	9 MB	65 W	April 2019	US $192
Core i5	9500F	SRF6Q	U0	6 (6)	3.0	4.4	—N/a		9 MB	65 W	April 2019	US $192
Core i5	9500F	SRG10	R0	6 (6)	3.0	4.4	—N/a		9 MB	65 W	April 2019	US $192
Core i5	9500T	SRF4D	U0	6 (6)	2.2	3.7	UHD 630	350–1100	9 MB	35 W	April 2019	US $192
Core i5	9400	SR3X5	U0	6 (6)	2.9	4.1	UHD 630	350–1050	9 MB	65 W	January 2019	US $182
Core i5	9400	SRELV	P0	6 (6)	2.9	4.1	UHD 630	350–1050	9 MB	65 W	January 2019	US $182
Core i5	9400	SRG0Y	R0	6 (6)	2.9	4.1	UHD 630	350–1050	9 MB	65 W	January 2019	US $182
Core i5	9400F	SRF6M	U0	6 (6)	2.9	4.1	—N/a		9 MB	65 W	January 2019	US $182
Core i5	9400F	SRFAH	P0	6 (6)	2.9	4.1	—N/a		9 MB	65 W	January 2019	US $182
Core i5	9400F	SRG0Z	R0	6 (6)	2.9	4.1	—N/a		9 MB	65 W	January 2019	US $182
Core i5	9400T	SR3X8	U0	6 (6)	1.8	3.4	UHD 630	350–1050	9 MB	35 W	April 2019	US $182
Xeon E	2274G	SRFDE	U0	4 (8)	4.0	4.9	UHD P630	350-1200	8 MB	83 W	May 2019	US $328-370
Xeon E	2244G	SRFAY	U0	4 (8)	3.8	4.8	UHD P630	350-1200	8 MB	71 W	May 2019	US $272-306
Xeon E	2234	SRFAX	U0	4 (8)	3.6	4.8	—N/a		8 MB	71 W	May 2019	US $250
Core i3	9350K	SRCZT	B0	4 (4)	4.0	4.6	UHD 630	350–1150	8 MB	91 W	April 2019	US $173
Core i3	9350KF	SRF7V	B0	4 (4)	4.0	4.6	—N/a		8 MB	91 W	January 2019	US $173
Xeon E	2224G	SRFAW	U0	4 (4)	3.5	4.7	UHD P630	350-1200	8 MB	71 W	May 2019	US $213
Xeon E	2224	SRFAV	U0	4 (4)	3.4	4.6	—N/a		8 MB	71 W	May 2019	US $217
Core i3	9320	SRF7X	B0	4 (4)	3.7	4.4	UHD 630	350–1150	8 MB	62 W	April 2019	US $154
Core i3	9300	SRCZU	B0	4 (4)	3.7	4.3	UHD 630	350–1150	8 MB	62 W	April 2019	US $143
Core i3	9300T	SRCZW	B0	4 (4)	3.2	3.8	UHD 630	350–1100	8 MB	35 W	April 2019	US $143
Core i3	9100	SRCZV	B0	4 (4)	3.6	4.2	UHD 630	350–1100	6 MB	65 W	April 2019	US $122
Core i3	9100F	SRF7W	B0	4 (4)	3.6	4.2	—N/a		6 MB	65 W	April 2019	US $122
Core i3	9100T	SRCZX	B0	4 (4)	3.1	3.7	UHD 630	350–1100	6 MB	35 W	April 2019	US $122
Pentium Gold	G5620	SR3YC	B0	2 (4)	4.0	—N/a	UHD 630	350–1100	4 MB	54 W	April 2019	US $93
Pentium Gold	G5420	SR3YH	B0	2 (4)	3.8	—N/a	UHD 610	350–1050	4 MB	54 W	April 2019	US $64
Pentium Gold	G5420	SR3XA	U0	2 (4)	3.8	—N/a	UHD 610	350–1050	4 MB	54 W	April 2019	US $64
Pentium Gold	G5600T	SR3YF	B0	2 (4)	3.3	—N/a	UHD 630	350–1050	4 MB	35 W	April 2019	US $75
Pentium Gold	G5420T	SR3XC	U0	2 (4)	3.2	—N/a	UHD 610	350–1050	4 MB	35 W	April 2019	US $75
Celeron	G4950	SR3YM	B0	2 (2)	3.3	—N/a	UHD 610	350–1050	2 MB	54 W	April 2019	US $52
Celeron	G4930	SR3YN	B0	2 (2)	3.2	—N/a	UHD 610	350–1050	2 MB	54 W	April 2019	US $42
Celeron	G4930T	SR3YQ	B0	2 (2)	3.0	—N/a	UHD 610	350–1000	2 MB	35 W	April 2019	US $42

=== Skylake-X (9xxx) ===
Common features of Core i (9th gen) Skylake-X desktop processors:

- Socket: LGA 2066.
- All CPUs support the X299 chipset.
- All the CPUs support quad-channel DDR4-2666 RAM.
- All CPU models provide 44 lanes of PCIe 3.0.
- All CPUs feature a DMI 3.0 bus to the chipset (PCH).
- All models support: MMX, SSE, SSE2, SSE3, SSSE3, SSE4.1, SSE4.2, AVX, AVX2, AVX-512 FMA3, Intel 64, Intel VT-x
- No integrated graphics.
- L1 cache: 64 KB (32 KB data + 32 KB instructions) per core.
- L2 cache: 1 MB per core.
- Fabrication process: 14 nm.
- X-suffix, and XE-suffix processors have an unlocked multiplier and can be overclocked.

Processor branding	Model	Cores (Threads)	Clock rate (GHz)			Smart Cache	TDP	Release date	MSRP
Processor branding	Model	Cores (Threads)	Base	Turbo 2.0	Turbo 3.0	Smart Cache	TDP	Release date	MSRP
Core i9	9990XE	14 (28)	4.0	5.0	5.0	19.25 MB	255 W	January 2019	OEM
Core i9	9980XE	18 (36)	3.0	4.4	4.5	24.75 MB	165 W	Q4 2018	US $1979
Core i9	9960X	16 (32)	3.1	4.4	4.5	22 MB	165 W	Q4 2018	US $1684
Core i9	9940X	14 (28)	3.3	4.4	4.5	19.25 MB	165 W	Q4 2018	US $1387
Core i9	9920X	12 (24)	3.5	4.4	4.5	19.25 MB	165 W	Q4 2018	US $1189
Core i9	9900X	10 (20)	3.5	4.4	4.5	19.25 MB	165 W	Q4 2018	US $989
Core i9	9820X	10 (20)	3.3	4.1	4.2	16.5 MB	165 W	Q4 2018	US $889
Core i7	9800X	8 (16)	3.8	4.4	4.5	16.5 MB	165 W	November 2018	US $589

== Core i (10th gen), Xeon W-1200 and Xeon W-2200 ==
=== Comet Lake-S ===
Common features of Core i (10th gen) and Xeon W-1200 Comet Lake-S desktop processors:

- Socket: LGA 1200.
- Supported chipsets: B460, H410, H420E, H470, Q470, Q470E, W480, W480E (Xeon W only supports W480 chipset).
- All the CPUs support dual-channel DDR4 RAM at up to 2666 MT/s speed. Models i7 and up support it at up to 2933 MT/s speed; Xeon W models supports ECC Unbuffered memory.
- All CPU models provide 16 lanes of PCIe 3.0.
- All CPUs feature a DMI 3.0 4-lane bus to the chipset (PCH).
- All models support: MMX, SSE, SSE2, SSE3, SSSE3, SSE4.1, SSE4.2, AVX, AVX2, FMA3, Intel 64, Intel VT-x
- L1 cache: 64 KB (32 KB data + 32 KB instructions) per core.
- L2 cache: 256 KB per core.
- Fabrication process: 14 nm.
- K-suffix processors have an unlocked multiplier and can be overclocked.
- i9 models and 10 Cores Xeon W models support Thermal Velocity Boost.
- i9 and i7 models support Turbo Boost 3.0, while i5 and i3 only support Turbo Boost 2.0. The turbo clock speeds shown are of the highest turbo boost version supported by the processor.

Processor branding	Model	sSpec Number	Stepping	Cores (Threads)	Clock rate (GHz)			Integrated GPU		Smart Cache	TDP	Release date	MSRP
Processor branding	Model	sSpec Number	Stepping	Cores (Threads)	Base	Turbo	TVB	Model	Clock (MHz)	Smart Cache	TDP	Release date	MSRP
Xeon W	1290P	SRH93	Q0	10 (20)	3.7	5.2	5.3	UHD P630	350–1200	20 MB	125 W	May 2020	US $539
Core i9	10900K	SRH91	Q0	10 (20)	3.7	5.2	5.3	UHD 630	350–1200	20 MB	125 W	April 2020	US $488
Core i9	10900KF	SRH92	Q0	10 (20)	3.7	5.2	5.3	—N/a		20 MB	125 W	April 2020	US $472
Core i9	10910	SRJYZ	Q0	10 (20)	3.6	5.0	—N/a	UHD 630	350–1200	20 MB	125 W	Q3 2020	OEM
Xeon W	1290	SRH94	Q0	10 (20)	3.2	5.1	5.2	UHD P630	350–1200	20 MB	80 W	May 2020	US $494-546
Core i9	10900	SRH8Z	Q0	10 (20)	2.8	5.1	5.2	UHD 630	350–1200	20 MB	65 W	April 2020	US $439
Core i9	10900F	SRH90	Q0	10 (20)	2.8	5.1	5.2	—N/a		20 MB	65 W	April 2020	US $422
Xeon W	1290T	SRH97	Q0	10 (20)	1.9	4.7	—N/a	UHD P630	350–1200	20 MB	35 W	May 2020	US $494-546
Core i9	10900T	SRH8Y	Q0	10 (20)	1.9	4.6	—N/a	UHD 630	350–1200	20 MB	35 W	April 2020	US $439
Core i9	10900TE	SRJFC	Q0	10 (20)	1.8	4.5	—N/a	UHD 630	350–1200	20 MB	35 W	April 2020	US $488
Core i9	10850K	SRK51	Q0	10 (20)	3.6	5.1	5.2	UHD 630	350–1200	20 MB	125 W	July 2020	US $453
Xeon W	1270P	SRH95	Q0	8 (16)	3.8	5.1	—N/a	UHD P630	350–1200	16 MB	125 W	May 2020	US $428-472
Core i7	10700K	SRH72	Q0	8 (16)	3.8	5.1	—N/a	UHD 630	350–1200	16 MB	125 W	May 2020	US $374
Core i7	10700KF	SRH74	Q0	8 (16)	3.8	5.1	—N/a	—N/a		16 MB	125 W	May 2020	US $349
Xeon W	1270	SRH96	Q0	8 (16)	3.4	5.0	—N/a	UHD P630	350–1200	16 MB	80 W	May 2020	US $362-398
Core i7	10700	SRH6Y	Q0	8 (16)	2.9	4.8	—N/a	UHD 630	350–1200	16 MB	65 W	May 2020	US $323
Core i7	10700F	SRH70	Q0	8 (16)	2.9	4.8	—N/a	—N/a		16 MB	65 W	May 2020	US $298
Core i7	10700T	SRH6U	Q0	8 (16)	2.0	4.5	—N/a	UHD 630	350–1200	16 MB	35 W	May 2020	US $325
Xeon W	1250P	SRH7H	Q0	6 (12)	4.1	4.8	—N/a	UHD P630	350–1200	12 MB	125 W	May 2020	US $311-342
Core i5	10600K	SRH6R	Q0	6 (12)	4.1	4.8	—N/a	UHD 630	350–1200	12 MB	125 W	April 2020	US $262
Core i5	10600KF	SRH6S	Q0	6 (12)	4.1	4.8	—N/a	—N/a		12 MB	125 W	April 2020	US $237
Xeon W	1250	SRH48	G1	6 (12)	3.3	4.7	—N/a	UHD P630	350–1200	12 MB	80 W	May 2020	US $255-280
Core i5	10600	SRH37	G1	6 (12)	3.3	4.8	—N/a	UHD 630	350–1200	12 MB	65 W	April 2020	US $213
Core i5	10600T	SRH39	G1	6 (12)	2.4	4.0	—N/a	UHD 630	350–1200	12 MB	35 W	April 2020	US $213
Core i5	10500	SRH3A	G1	6 (12)	3.1	4.5	—N/a	UHD 630	350–1150	12 MB	65 W	April 2020	US $192
Core i5	10500T	SRH3B	G1	6 (12)	2.3	3.8	—N/a	UHD 630	350–1150	12 MB	35 W	April 2020	US $192
Core i5	10400	SRH78	Q0	6 (12)	2.9	4.3	—N/a	UHD 630	350–1100	12 MB	65 W	April 2020	US $182
Core i5	10400	SRH3C	G1	6 (12)	2.9	4.3	—N/a	UHD 630	350–1100	12 MB	65 W	April 2020	US $182
Core i5	10400F	SRH79	Q0	6 (12)	2.9	4.3	—N/a	—N/a		12 MB	65 W	April 2020	US $157
Core i5	10400F	SRH3D	G1	6 (12)	2.9	4.3	—N/a	—N/a		12 MB	65 W	April 2020	US $157
Core i5	10400T	SRH3F	G1	6 (12)	2.0	3.6	—N/a	UHD 630	350–1100	12 MB	35 W	April 2020	US $182
Core i3	10320	SRH3G	G1	4 (8)	3.8	4.6	—N/a	UHD 630	350–1150	8 MB	65 W	April 2020	US $154
Core i3	10300	SRH3J	G1	4 (8)	3.7	4.4	—N/a	UHD 630	350–1150	8 MB	65 W	April 2020	US $143
Core i3	10300T	SRH3L	G1	4 (8)	3.0	3.9	—N/a	UHD 630	350–1100	8 MB	35 W	April 2020	US $143
Core i3	10100	SRH3N	G1	4 (8)	3.6	4.3	—N/a	UHD 630	350–1100	6 MB	65 W	April 2020	US $122
Core i3	10100F	SRH8U	G1	4 (8)	3.6	4.3	—N/a	—N/a		6 MB	65 W	October 2020	US $97
Core i3	10100T	SRH3Q	G1	4 (8)	3.0	3.8	—N/a	UHD 630	350–1100	6 MB	35 W	April 2020	US $122
Pentium Gold	G6600	SRH3S	G1	2 (4)	4.2	—N/a	—N/a	UHD 630	350–1100	4 MB	58 W	April 2020	US $86-$93
Pentium Gold	G6500	SRH3U	G1	2 (4)	4.1	—N/a	—N/a	UHD 630	350–1100	4 MB	58 W	April 2020	US $75
Pentium Gold	G6400	SRH3Y	G1	2 (4)	4.0	—N/a	—N/a	UHD 610	350–1050	4 MB	58 W	April 2020	US $64
Pentium Gold	G6500T	SRH3W	G1	2 (4)	3.5	—N/a	—N/a	UHD 630	350–1050	4 MB	35 W	April 2020	US $75
Pentium Gold	G6400T	SRH40	G1	2 (4)	3.4	—N/a	—N/a	UHD 610	350–1050	4 MB	35 W	April 2020	US $64
Celeron	G5925	SRK26	G1	2 (2)	3.6	—N/a	—N/a	UHD 610	350–1050	4 MB	58 W	July 2020	US $52
Celeron	G5905	SRK27	G1	2 (2)	3.5	—N/a	—N/a	UHD 610	350–1050	4 MB	58 W	July 2020	US $42
Celeron	G5905T	SRK28	G1	2 (2)	3.3	—N/a	—N/a	UHD 610	350–1000	4 MB	35 W	July 2020	US $42
Celeron	G5920	SRH42	G1	2 (2)	3.5	—N/a	—N/a	UHD 610	350–1050	2 MB	58 W	April 2020	US $52
Celeron	G5900	SRH44	G1	2 (2)	3.4	—N/a	—N/a	UHD 610	350–1050	2 MB	58 W	April 2020	US $42
Celeron	G5900T	SRH46	G1	2 (2)	3.2	—N/a	—N/a	UHD 610	350–1000	2 MB	35 W	April 2020	US $42

=== Comet Lake-S (refresh) ===
Released on the same day as the 11th gen Rocket Lake-S desktop processors.

Common features of Core i (10th gen) Comet Lake-S (refresh) desktop processors:

- Socket: LGA 1200.
- Supported chipsets: B460, H410, H420E, H470, Q470, Q470E, W480, W480E.
- All the CPUs support dual-channel DDR4-2666 RAM.
- All CPU models provide 16 lanes of PCIe 3.0.
- All CPUs feature a DMI 3.0 4-lane bus to the chipset (PCH).
- All models support: MMX, SSE, SSE2, SSE3, SSSE3, SSE4.1, SSE4.2, AVX, AVX2, FMA3, Intel 64, Intel VT-x
- L1 cache: 64 KB (32 KB data + 32 KB instructions) per core.
- L2 cache: 256 KB per core.
- Fabrication process: 14 nm.
- All Intel Core models support Turbo Boost 2.0.
- Stepping: G1.

Processor branding	Model	sSpec Number	Cores (Threads)	Clock rate (GHz)		Integrated GPU		Smart Cache	TDP	Release date	MSRP
Processor branding	Model	sSpec Number	Cores (Threads)	Base	Turbo	Model	Clock (MHz)	Smart Cache	TDP	Release date	MSRP
Core i5	10505	SRH38	6 (12)	3.2	4.6	UHD 630	350–1200	12 MB	65 W	March 2021	US $192
Core i3	10325	SRH3H	4 (8)	3.9	4.7	UHD 630	350–1150	8 MB	65 W	March 2021	US $154
Core i3	10305	SRH3K	4 (8)	3.8	4.5	UHD 630	350–1150	8 MB	65 W	March 2021	US $143
Core i3	10305T	SRH3M	4 (8)	3.0	4.0	UHD 630	350–1100	8 MB	35 W	March 2021	US $143
Core i3	10105	SRH3P	4 (8)	3.7	4.4	UHD 630	350–1100	6 MB	65 W	March 2021	US $122
Core i3	10105F	SRH8V	4 (8)	3.7	4.4	—N/a		6 MB	65 W	March 2021	US $97
Core i3	10105T	SRH3R	4 (8)	3.0	3.9	UHD 630	350–1100	6 MB	35 W	March 2021	US $122
Pentium Gold	G6605	SRH3T	2 (4)	4.3	—N/a	UHD 630	350–1100	4 MB	58 W	March 2021	US $86
Pentium Gold	G6505	SRH3V	2 (4)	4.2	—N/a	UHD 630	350–1100	4 MB	58 W	March 2021	US $75
Pentium Gold	G6405	SRH3Z	2 (4)	4.1	—N/a	UHD 610	350–1050	4 MB	58 W	March 2021	US $64
Pentium Gold	G6505T	SRH3X	2 (4)	3.6	—N/a	UHD 630	350–1050	4 MB	35 W	March 2021	US $75
Pentium Gold	G6405T	SRH41	2 (4)	3.5	—N/a	UHD 610	350–1050	4 MB	35 W	March 2021	US $64

=== Cascade Lake-X (10xxx) ===
Common features of Core i (10th gen) Cascade Lake-X desktop processors:

- Socket: LGA 2066.
- Core i9 CPUs support the X299 chipset; while Xeon W-2200 CPUs support the C422 chipset.
- All the CPUs support quad-channel DDR4-2933 RAM.
- All CPU models provide 48 lanes of PCIe 3.0.
- All CPUs feature a DMI 3.0 bus to the chipset (PCH).
- All models support: MMX, SSE, SSE2, SSE3, SSSE3, SSE4.1, SSE4.2, AVX, AVX2, FMA3, Intel 64, Intel VT-x
- No integrated graphics.
- L1 cache: 64 KB (32 KB data + 32 KB instructions) per core.
- L2 cache: 1 MB per core.
- Fabrication process: 14 nm.
- X-suffix, and XE-suffix processors have an unlocked multiplier and can be overclocked.
- Stepping: L1

Processor branding	Model	sSpec Number	Cores (Threads)	Clock rate (GHz)			Smart Cache	TDP	Release date	MSRP
Processor branding	Model	sSpec Number	Cores (Threads)	Base	Turbo 2.0	Turbo 3.0	Smart Cache	TDP	Release date	MSRP
Core i9	10980XE	SRGSG	18 (36)	3.0	4.6	4.8	24.75 MB	165 W	October 2019	US $979
Core i9	10940X	SRGSH	14 (28)	3.3	4.6	4.8	19.25 MB	165 W	October 2019	US $784
Core i9	10920X	SRGSJ	12 (24)	3.5	4.6	4.8	19.25 MB	165 W	October 2019	US $689
Core i9	10900X	SRGV7	10 (20)	3.7	4.5	4.7	19.25 MB	165 W	October 2019	US $590

== Core i (11th gen), Xeon W-1300 and Xeon E-2300 ==
=== Rocket Lake-S ===
Common features of Core i (11th gen) and Xeon W-1300 Rocket Lake-S desktop processors:

- Socket: LGA 1200.
- Supported chipsets: B560, H510, H570, Q570, Z590, W580, C252 and C256.
- All the CPUs support dual-channel DDR4-3200 RAM. The Core i9 K/KF processors enable a 1:1 ratio of DRAM to memory controller by default at DDR4-3200, whereas the Core i9 non K/KF and all other CPUs listed below enable a 2:1 ratio of DRAM to memory controller by default at DDR4-3200 and a 1:1 ratio by default at DDR4-2933.
- All CPU models provide 20 lanes of PCIe 4.0.
- All CPUs feature a DMI 3.0 8-lane bus to the chipset (PCH).
- All models support: MMX, SSE, SSE2, SSE3, SSSE3, SSE4.1, SSE4.2, AVX, AVX2, AVX-512, FMA3, Intel 64, Intel VT-x
- L1 cache: 80 KB (48 KB data + 32 KB instructions) per core.
- L2 cache: 512 KB per core.
- Fabrication process: 14 nm.
- K-suffix processors have an unlocked multiplier and can be overclocked.
- i9 and i7 models support Turbo Boost 3.0, while i5 only support Turbo Boost 2.0. The turbo clock speeds shown are of the highest turbo boost version supported by the processor.
- Stepping: B0

Processor branding	Model	sSpec Number	Cores (Threads)	Clock rate (GHz)			Integrated GPU		Smart Cache	TDP	Release date	MSRP
Processor branding	Model	sSpec Number	Cores (Threads)	Base	Turbo	TVB	Model	Clock (MHz)	Smart Cache	TDP	Release date	MSRP
Xeon W	1390P	SRKQA	8 (16)	3.5	5.2	5.3	UHD P750	350–1300	16 MB	125 W	May 2021	US $594
Core i9	11900K	SRKND	8 (16)	3.5	5.2	5.3	UHD 750	350–1300	16 MB	125 W	March 2021	US $539
Core i9	11900KF	SRKNF	8 (16)	3.5	5.2	5.3	—N/a		16 MB	125 W	March 2021	US $513
Xeon W	1390	SRKP5	8 (16)	2.8	5.1	5.2	UHD P750	350–1300	16 MB	80 W	May 2021	US $546
Core i9	11900	SRKNJ	8 (16)	2.5	5.1	5.2	UHD 750	350–1300	16 MB	65 W	March 2021	US $439
Core i9	11900F	SRKNK	8 (16)	2.5	5.1	5.2	—N/a		16 MB	65 W	March 2021	US $422
Xeon W	1390T	SRKP6	8 (16)	1.5	4.9	—N/a	UHD P750	350–1300	16 MB	35 W	May 2021	US $546
Core i9	11900T	SRKNQ	8 (16)	1.5	4.9	—N/a	UHD 750	350–1300	16 MB	35 W	March 2021	US $439
Xeon W	1370P	SRKP7	8 (16)	3.6	5.2	—N/a	UHD P750	350–1300	16 MB	125 W	May 2021	US $472
Core i7	11700K	SRKNL	8 (16)	3.6	5.0	—N/a	UHD 750	350–1300	16 MB	125 W	March 2021	US $399
Core i7	11700KF	SRKNN	8 (16)	3.6	5.0	—N/a	—N/a		16 MB	125 W	March 2021	US $374
Xeon E	2388G	SRKMZ	8 (16)	3.2	5.1	—N/a	UHD P750	350–1300	16 MB	95 W	September 2021	US $679
Xeon W	1370	SRKP8	8 (16)	2.9	5.1	—N/a	UHD P750	350–1300	16 MB	80 W	May 2021	US $398
Xeon E	2378G	SRKN1	8 (16)	2.8	5.1	—N/a	UHD P750	350–1300	16 MB	80 W	September 2021	US $623-633
Xeon E	2378	SRKN4	8 (16)	2.6	4.8	—N/a	—N/a		16 MB	65 W	September 2021	US $455
Core i7	11700	SRKNS	8 (16)	2.5	4.9	—N/a	UHD 750	350–1300	16 MB	65 W	March 2021	US $323
Core i7	11700F	SRKNR	8 (16)	2.5	4.9	—N/a	—N/a		16 MB	65 W	March 2021	US $298
Core i7	11700T	SRKNT	8 (16)	1.4	4.6	—N/a	UHD 750	350–1300	16 MB	35 W	March 2021	US $323
Xeon W	1350P	SRKP9	6 (12)	4.0	5.1	—N/a	UHD P750	350–1300	12 MB	125 W	May 2021	US $342
Core i5	11600K	SRKNU	6 (12)	3.9	4.9	—N/a	UHD 750	350–1300	12 MB	125 W	March 2021	US $262
Core i5	11600KF	SRKNV	6 (12)	3.9	4.9	—N/a	—N/a		12 MB	125 W	March 2021	US $237
Xeon E	2386G	SRKN0	6 (12)	3.5	5.1	—N/a	UHD P750	350–1300	12 MB	95 W	September 2021	US$567
Xeon W	1350	SRKPA	6 (12)	3.3	5.0	—N/a	UHD P750	350–1300	12 MB	80 W	May 2021	US $280
Xeon E	2356G	SRKN2	6 (12)	3.2	5.0	—N/a	UHD P750	350–1300	12 MB	80 W	September 2021	US $392
Xeon E	2336	SRKN5	6 (12)	2.9	4.8	—N/a	—N/a		12 MB	65 W	September 2021	US $357-367
Core i5	11600	SRKNW	6 (12)	2.8	4.8	—N/a	UHD 750	350–1300	12 MB	65 W	March 2021	US $213
Core i5	11600T	SRKNX	6 (12)	1.7	4.1	—N/a	UHD 750	350–1300	12 MB	35 W	March 2021	US $213
Core i5	11500	SRKNY	6 (12)	2.7	4.6	—N/a	UHD 750	350–1300	12 MB	65 W	March 2021	US $192
Core i5	11500T	SRKNZ	6 (12)	1.5	3.9	—N/a	UHD 750	350–1200	12 MB	35 W	March 2021	US $192
Core i5	11400	SRKP0	6 (12)	2.6	4.4	—N/a	UHD 730	350–1300	12 MB	65 W	March 2021	US $182
Core i5	11400F	SRKP1	6 (12)	2.6	4.4	—N/a	—N/a		12 MB	65 W	March 2021	US $157
Core i5	11400T	SRKP2	6 (12)	1.3	3.7	—N/a	UHD 730	350–1200	12 MB	35 W	March 2021	US $182
Xeon E	2374G	SRKN3	4 (8)	3.7	5.0	—N/a	UHD 750	350–1300	8 MB	80 W	September 2021	US $420-430
Xeon E	2334	SRKN6	4 (8)	3.4	4.8	—N/a	—N/a		8 MB	65 W	September 2021	US $315-325
Xeon E	2324G	SRKN7	4 (4)	3.1	4.6	—N/a	UHD 750	350–1300	8 MB	65 W	September 2021	US $273-283
Xeon E	2314	SRKN8	4 (4)	2.8	4.5	—N/a	—N/a		8 MB	65 W	September 2021	US $228

=== Tiger Lake-B ===
Common features of Core i (11th gen) Tiger Lake-B desktop processors:

- Socket: BGA 1787 (soldered).
- All the CPUs support dual-channel DDR4-3200 RAM.
- All CPU models provide 20 lanes of PCIe 4.0.
- All CPUs feature a DMI 3.0 bus to the chipset (PCH).
- All models support: MMX, SSE, SSE2, SSE3, SSSE3, SSE4.1, SSE4.2, AVX, AVX2, FMA3, Intel 64, Intel VT-x
- L1 cache: 80 KB (48 KB data + 32 KB instructions) per core.
- L2 cache: 1.25 MB per core.
- Fabrication process: 10 nm.
- K-suffix processors have an unlocked multiplier and can be overclocked.
- These CPUs were sold to OEMs only.

Processor branding	Model	Cores (Threads)	Clock rate (GHz)		Integrated GPU		Smart Cache	TDP	Release date
Processor branding	Model	Cores (Threads)	Base	Turbo	Model	Clock (MHz)	Smart Cache	TDP	Release date
Core i9	11900KB	8 (16)	3.3	4.9	UHD Graphics (32 EU)	350–1450	24 MB	55–65 W	May 2021
Core i7	11700B	8 (16)	3.2	4.8	UHD Graphics (32 EU)	350–1450	24 MB	55–65 W	May 2021
Core i5	11500B	6 (12)	3.3	4.6	UHD Graphics (32 EU)	350–1450	12 MB	65 W	May 2021
Core i3	11100B	4 (8)	3.6	4.4	UHD Graphics (16 EU)	350–1400	12 MB	65 W	May 2021

== Core i (12th gen) ==
=== Alder Lake-S ===
Common features of Core i (12th gen) desktop processors:

- Socket: LGA 1700.
- Supported chipsets: B660, B760, H610, H670, Q670E, R680E, W680, Z690, Z790.
- All the CPUs support dual-channel DDR4-3200 or DDR5-4800 RAM.
- All the CPUs provide 16 lanes of PCIe 5.0 and 4 lanes of PCIe 4.0, but support may vary depending on motherboard and chipsets.
- All CPUs feature a DMI 4.0 8-lane bus to the chipset (PCH).
- All models support: MMX, SSE, SSE2, SSE3, SSSE3, SSE4.1, SSE4.2, AVX, AVX2, AVX-VNNI, FMA3, Intel 64, Intel VT-x
- L1 cache:
  - P-cores: 80 KB (48 KB data + 32 KB instructions) per core.
  - E-cores: 96 KB (64 KB data + 32 KB instructions) per core.
- L2 cache:
  - P-cores: 1.25 MB per core.
  - E-cores: 2 MB per E-core cluster (each "cluster" contains four cores)
- Fabrication process: Intel 7.
- K-suffix processors have an unlocked multiplier and can be overclocked.
- i9 and i7 models support Turbo Boost 3.0 on the P-cores, while i5 only support Turbo Boost 2.0. The turbo clock speeds shown are of the highest turbo boost version supported by the processor.

Processor branding	Model	P-core (performance)				E-core (efficiency)			Integrated GPU		Smart Cache	TDP		Release date	MSRP
Processor branding	Model	Cores (Threads)	Clock rate (GHz)			Cores (Threads)	Clock rate (GHz)		Model	Clock (MHz)	Smart Cache	Base	Max. Turbo	Release date	MSRP
Processor branding	Model	Cores (Threads)	Base	Turbo	TVB	Cores (Threads)	Base	Turbo	Model	Clock (MHz)	Smart Cache	Base	Max. Turbo	Release date	MSRP
Core i9	12900KS	8 (16)	3.4	5.3	5.5	8 (8)	2.5	4.0	UHD 770	300–1550	30 MB	150 W	241 W	April 2022	US $739
Core i9	12900K	8 (16)	3.2	5.2	—N/a	8 (8)	2.4	3.9	UHD 770	300–1550	30 MB	125 W	241 W	November 2021	US $589
Core i9	12900KF	8 (16)	3.2	5.2	—N/a	8 (8)	2.4	3.9	—N/a		30 MB	125 W	241 W	November 2021	US $564
Core i9	12900	8 (16)	2.4	5.1	—N/a	8 (8)	1.8	3.8	UHD 770	300–1550	30 MB	65 W	202 W	January 2022	US $489
Core i9	12900F	8 (16)	2.4	5.1	—N/a	8 (8)	1.8	3.8	—N/a		30 MB	65 W	202 W	January 2022	US $464
Core i9	12900T	8 (16)	1.4	4.9	—N/a	8 (8)	1.0	3.6	UHD 770	300–1550	30 MB	35 W	106 W	January 2022	US $489
Core i7	12700K	8 (16)	3.6	5.0	—N/a	4 (4)	2.7	3.8	UHD 770	300–1500	25 MB	125 W	190 W	November 2021	US $409
Core i7	12700KF	8 (16)	3.6	5.0	—N/a	4 (4)	2.7	3.8	—N/a		25 MB	125 W	190 W	November 2021	US $384
Core i7	12700	8 (16)	2.1	4.9	—N/a	4 (4)	1.6	3.6	UHD 770	300–1500	25 MB	65 W	180 W	January 2022	US $339
Core i7	12700F	8 (16)	2.1	4.9	—N/a	4 (4)	1.6	3.6	—N/a		25 MB	65 W	180 W	January 2022	US $314
Core i7	12700T	8 (16)	1.4	4.7	—N/a	4 (4)	1.0	3.4	UHD 770	300–1500	25 MB	35 W	106 W	January 2022	US $339
Core i5	12600K	6 (12)	3.7	4.9	—N/a	4 (4)	2.8	3.6	UHD 770	300–1450	20 MB	125 W	150 W	November 2021	US $289
Core i5	12600KF	6 (12)	3.7	4.9	—N/a	4 (4)	2.8	3.6	—N/a		20 MB	125 W	150 W	November 2021	US $264
Core i5	12600	6 (12)	3.3	4.8	—N/a	—N/a			UHD 770	300–1450	18 MB	65 W	117 W	January 2022	US $223
Core i5	12600T	6 (12)	2.1	4.6	—N/a	—N/a			UHD 770	300–1450	18 MB	35 W	74 W	January 2022	US $223
Core i5	12500	6 (12)	3.0	4.6	—N/a	—N/a			UHD 770	300–1450	18 MB	65 W	117 W	January 2022	US $202
Core i5	12500T	6 (12)	2.0	4.4	—N/a	—N/a			UHD 770	300–1450	18 MB	35 W	74 W	January 2022	US $202
Core i5	12490F	6 (12)	3.0	4.6	—N/a	—N/a			—N/a		20 MB	65 W	117 W	February 2022	CN ¥1599
Core i5	12400	6 (12)	2.5	4.4	—N/a	—N/a			UHD 730	300–1450	18 MB	65 W	117 W	January 2022	US $202
Core i5	12400F	6 (12)	2.5	4.4	—N/a	—N/a			—N/a		18 MB	65 W	117 W	January 2022	US $192
Core i5	12400T	6 (12)	1.8	4.2	—N/a	—N/a			UHD 730	350–1450	18 MB	35 W	74 W	January 2022	US $202
Core i3	12300	4 (8)	3.5	4.4	—N/a	—N/a			UHD 730	350–1450	12 MB	60 W	89 W	January 2022	US $143
Core i3	12300T	4 (8)	2.3	4.2	—N/a	—N/a			UHD 730	350–1450	12 MB	35 W	69 W	January 2022	US $143
Core i3	12100	4 (8)	3.3	4.3	—N/a	—N/a			UHD 730	300–1400	12 MB	60 W	89 W	January 2022	US $122
Core i3	12100F	4 (8)	3.3	4.3	—N/a	—N/a			—N/a		12 MB	58 W	89 W	January 2022	US $97
Core i3	12100T	4 (8)	2.2	4.1	—N/a	—N/a			UHD 730	300–1400	12 MB	35 W	69 W	January 2022	US $122

== Core i (13th gen) ==
=== Raptor Lake-S ===
Common features of Core i (13th gen) desktop processors:

- Socket: LGA 1700.
- Supported chipsets: B660, B760, H610, H670, H710, H770, Q670E, R680E, W680, Z690, Z790.
- All the CPUs support dual-channel DDR4-3200 or DDR5-5600 RAM.
- All the CPUs provide 16 lanes of PCIe 5.0 and 4 lanes of PCIe 4.0, but support may vary depending on motherboard and chipsets.
- All CPUs feature a DMI 4.0 8-lane bus to the chipset (PCH).
- All models support: MMX, SSE, SSE2, SSE3, SSSE3, SSE4.1, SSE4.2, AVX, AVX2, AVX-VNNI, FMA3, Intel 64, Intel VT-x
- L1 cache:
  - P-cores: 80 KB (48 KB data + 32 KB instructions) per core.
  - E-cores: 96 KB (64 KB data + 32 KB instructions) per core.
- L2 cache:
  - P-cores: 2 MB per core on i5-13600K/KF and above models, 1.25 MB per core on 13600 and below models.
  - E-cores: 4 MB per E-core cluster on i5-13600K/KF and above models, 2 MB per cluster on 13600 and below models (each "cluster" contains four cores).
- Fabrication process: Intel 7.
- K-suffix processors have an unlocked multiplier and can be overclocked.
- i9 and i7 models support Turbo Boost 3.0 on the P-cores, while i5 only support Turbo Boost 2.0. The turbo clock speeds shown are of the highest turbo boost version supported by the processor.

Processor branding	Model	P-core (performance)				E-core (efficiency)			Integrated GPU		Smart Cache	TDP		Release date	MSRP
Processor branding	Model	Cores (Threads)	Clock rate (GHz)			Cores (Threads)	Clock rate (GHz)		Model	Clock (MHz)	Smart Cache	Base	Max. Turbo	Release date	MSRP
Processor branding	Model	Cores (Threads)	Base	Turbo	TVB	Cores (Threads)	Base	Turbo	Model	Clock (MHz)	Smart Cache	Base	Max. Turbo	Release date	MSRP
Core i9	13900KS	8 (16)	3.2	5.8	6.0	16 (16)	2.4	4.3	UHD 770	300–1650	36 MB	150 W	253 W	January 2023	US $689
Core i9	13900K	8 (16)	3.0	5.7	5.8	16 (16)	2.2	4.3	UHD 770	300–1650	36 MB	125 W	253 W	October 2022	US $589
Core i9	13900KF	8 (16)	3.0	5.7	5.8	16 (16)	2.2	4.3	—N/a		36 MB	125 W	253 W	October 2022	US $564
Core i9	13900	8 (16)	2.0	5.5	5.6	16 (16)	1.5	4.2	UHD 770	300–1650	36 MB	65 W	219 W	January 2023	US $549
Core i9	13900F	8 (16)	2.0	5.5	5.6	16 (16)	1.5	4.2	—N/a		36 MB	65 W	219 W	January 2023	US $524
Core i9	13900T	8 (16)	1.1	5.3	—N/a	16 (16)	0.8	3.9	UHD 770	300–1650	36 MB	35 W	106 W	January 2023	US $549
Core i7	13790F	8 (16)	2.1	5.2	—N/a	8 (8)	1.5	4.1	—N/a		33 MB	65 W	219 W	February 2023	CN ¥2999
Core i7	13700K	8 (16)	3.4	5.4	—N/a	8 (8)	2.5	4.2	UHD 770	300–1600	30 MB	125 W	253 W	October 2022	US $409
Core i7	13700KF	8 (16)	3.4	5.4	—N/a	8 (8)	2.5	4.2	—N/a		30 MB	125 W	253 W	October 2022	US $384
Core i7	13700	8 (16)	2.1	5.2	—N/a	8 (8)	1.5	4.1	UHD 770	300–1600	30 MB	65 W	219 W	January 2023	US $384
Core i7	13700F	8 (16)	2.1	5.2	—N/a	8 (8)	1.5	4.1	—N/a		30 MB	65 W	219 W	January 2023	US $359
Core i7	13700T	8 (16)	1.4	4.9	—N/a	8 (8)	1.0	3.6	UHD 770	300–1600	30 MB	35 W	106 W	January 2023	US $384
Core i5	13600K	6 (12)	3.5	5.1	—N/a	8 (8)	2.6	3.9	UHD 770	300–1500	24 MB	125 W	181 W	October 2022	US $319
Core i5	13600KF	6 (12)	3.5	5.1	—N/a	8 (8)	2.6	3.9	—N/a		24 MB	125 W	181 W	October 2022	US $294
Core i5	13600	6 (12)	2.7	5.0	—N/a	8 (8)	2.0	3.7	UHD 770	300–1550	24 MB	65 W	154 W	January 2023	US $255
Core i5	13600T	6 (12)	1.8	4.8	—N/a	8 (8)	1.3	3.4	UHD 770	300–1550	24 MB	35 W	92 W	January 2023	US $255
Core i5	13500	6 (12)	2.5	4.8	—N/a	8 (8)	1.8	3.5	UHD 770	300–1550	24 MB	65 W	154 W	January 2023	US $232
Core i5	13500T	6 (12)	1.6	4.6	—N/a	8 (8)	1.2	3.2	UHD 770	300–1550	24 MB	35 W	92 W	January 2023	US $232
Core i5	13490F	6 (12)	2.5	4.8	—N/a	4 (4)	1.8	3.5	—N/a		24 MB	65 W	148 W	February 2023	CN ¥1599
Core i5	13400	6 (12)	2.5	4.6	—N/a	4 (4)	1.8	3.3	UHD 730	300–1550	20 MB	65 W	154 W	January 2023	US $221
Core i5	13400F	6 (12)	2.5	4.6	—N/a	4 (4)	1.8	3.3	—N/a		20 MB	65 W	148 W	January 2023	US $196
Core i5	13400T	6 (12)	1.3	4.4	—N/a	4 (4)	1.0	3.0	UHD 730	300–1550	20 MB	35 W	82 W	January 2023	US $221
Core i3	13100	4 (8)	3.4	4.5	—N/a	—N/a			UHD 730	300–1500	12 MB	60 W	89 W	January 2023	US $134
Core i3	13100F	4 (8)	3.4	4.5	—N/a	—N/a			—N/a		12 MB	60 W	89 W	January 2023	US $109
Core i3	13100T	4 (8)	2.5	4.2	—N/a	—N/a			UHD 730	300–1500	12 MB	35 W	69 W	January 2023	US $134

== Core i (14th gen), Xeon E-2400 and Xeon 6300 ==
=== Raptor Lake-S Refresh ===
Common features of Core i (14th gen) desktop processors:

- Socket: LGA 1700.
- Supported chipsets: B660, B760, H610, H670, H710, H770, Q670E, R680E, W680, Z690, Z790, C262 and C266.
- All the CPUs support dual-channel DDR4-3200 or DDR5-5600 RAM.
- All the CPUs provide 16 lanes of PCIe 5.0 and 4 lanes of PCIe 4.0, but support may vary depending on motherboard and chipsets.
- All CPUs feature a DMI 4.0 8-lane bus to the chipset (PCH).
- All models support: MMX, SSE, SSE2, SSE3, SSSE3, SSE4.1, SSE4.2, AVX, AVX2, AVX-VNNI, FMA3, Intel 64, Intel VT-x
- L1 cache:
  - P-cores: 80 KB (48 KB data + 32 KB instructions) per core.
  - E-cores: 96 KB (64 KB data + 32 KB instructions) per core.
- L2 cache:
  - P-cores: 2 MB per core on i5-14600/T/K/KF and above models, 1.25 MB per core on 14500 and below models.
  - E-cores: 4 MB per E-core cluster on i5-14600/T/K/KF and above models, 2 MB per cluster on 14500 and below models (each "cluster" contains four cores).
- Fabrication process: Intel 7.
- K-suffix processors have an unlocked multiplier and can be overclocked.
- i9 and i7 models support Turbo Boost 3.0 on the P-cores, while i5 only support Turbo Boost 2.0. The turbo clock speeds shown are of the highest turbo boost version supported by the processor.

Processor branding	Model	P-core (performance)				E-core (efficiency)			Integrated GPU		Smart Cache	TDP		Release date	MSRP
Processor branding	Model	Cores (Threads)	Clock rate (GHz)			Cores (Threads)	Clock rate (GHz)		Model	Clock (MHz)	Smart Cache	Base	Max. Turbo	Release date	MSRP
Processor branding	Model	Cores (Threads)	Base	Turbo	TVB	Cores (Threads)	Base	Turbo	Model	Clock (MHz)	Smart Cache	Base	Max. Turbo	Release date	MSRP
Core i9	14900KS	8 (16)	3.2	5.9	6.2	16 (16)	2.4	4.5	UHD 770	300–1650	36 MB	150 W	253 W	March 2024	US $689
Core i9	14900K	8 (16)	3.2	5.8	6.0	16 (16)	2.4	4.4	UHD 770	300–1650	36 MB	125 W	253 W	October 2023	US $589
Core i9	14900KF	8 (16)	3.2	5.8	6.0	16 (16)	2.4	4.4	—N/a		36 MB	125 W	253 W	October 2023	US $564
Core i9	14900	8 (16)	2.0	5.6	5.8	16 (16)	1.5	4.3	UHD 770	300–1650	36 MB	65 W	219 W	January 2024	US $549
Core i9	14900F	8 (16)	2.0	5.6	5.8	16 (16)	1.5	4.3	—N/a		36 MB	65 W	219 W	January 2024	US $524
Core i9	14900T	8 (16)	1.1	5.5	—N/a	16 (16)	0.9	3.7	UHD 770	300–1650	36 MB	35 W	106 W	January 2024	US $549
Core i7	14790F	8 (16)	2.1	5.4	—N/a	8 (8)	1.5	4.2	—N/a		36 MB	65 W	219 W	January 2024	China only
Core i7	14700K	8 (16)	3.4	5.6	—N/a	12 (12)	2.5	4.3	UHD 770	300–1600	33 MB	125 W	253 W	October 2023	US $409
Core i7	14700KF	8 (16)	3.4	5.6	—N/a	12 (12)	2.5	4.3	—N/a		33 MB	125 W	253 W	October 2023	US $384
Core i7	14700	8 (16)	2.1	5.4	—N/a	12 (12)	1.5	4.2	UHD 770	300–1600	33 MB	65 W	219 W	January 2024	US $384
Core i7	14700F	8 (16)	2.1	5.4	—N/a	12 (12)	1.5	4.2	—N/a		33 MB	65 W	219 W	January 2024	US $359
Core i7	14700T	8 (16)	1.3	5.2	—N/a	12 (12)	0.9	3.7	UHD 770	300–1600	33 MB	35 W	106 W	January 2024	US $384
Core i5	14600K	6 (12)	3.5	5.3	—N/a	8 (8)	2.6	4.0	UHD 770	300–1550	24 MB	125 W	181 W	October 2023	US $319
Core i5	14600KF	6 (12)	3.5	5.3	—N/a	8 (8)	2.6	4.0	—N/a		24 MB	125 W	181 W	October 2023	US $294
Core i5	14600	6 (12)	2.7	5.2	—N/a	8 (8)	2.0	3.9	UHD 770	300–1550	24 MB	65 W	154 W	January 2024	US $255
Core i5	14600T	6 (12)	1.8	5.1	—N/a	8 (8)	1.3	3.6	UHD 770	300–1550	24 MB	35 W	92 W	January 2024	US $255
Core i5	14500	6 (12)	2.6	5.0	—N/a	8 (8)	1.9	3.7	UHD 770	300–1550	24 MB	65 W	154 W	January 2024	US $232
Core i5	14500T	6 (12)	1.7	4.8	—N/a	8 (8)	1.2	3.4	UHD 770	300–1550	24 MB	35 W	92 W	January 2024	US $232
Core i5	14490F	6 (12)	2.8	4.9	—N/a	4 (4)	2.1	3.7	—N/a		24 MB	65 W	148 W	January 2024	China only
Core i5	14400	6 (12)	2.5	4.7	—N/a	4 (4)	1.8	3.5	UHD 730	300–1550	20 MB	65 W	148 W	January 2024	US $221
Core i5	14400F	6 (12)	2.5	4.7	—N/a	4 (4)	1.8	3.5	—N/a		20 MB	65 W	148 W	January 2024	US $196
Core i5	14400T	6 (12)	1.5	4.5	—N/a	4 (4)	1.1	3.2	UHD 730	300–1550	20 MB	35 W	82 W	January 2024	US $221
Core i3	14100	4 (8)	3.5	4.7	—N/a	—N/a			UHD 730	300–1500	12 MB	60 W	110 W	January 2024	US $134
Core i3	14100F	4 (8)	3.5	4.7	—N/a	—N/a			—N/a		12 MB	60 W	110 W	January 2024	US $109
Core i3	14100T	4 (8)	2.7	4.4	—N/a	—N/a			UHD 730	300–1500	12 MB	35 W	69 W	January 2024	US $134
Intel Processor	300	2 (4)	3.9	—N/a	—N/a	—N/a			UHD 710	300-1450	6 MB	46 W		January 2024	US $82-92
Intel Processor	300T	2 (4)	3.4	—N/a	—N/a	—N/a			UHD 710	300-1450	6 MB	35 W		January 2024	US $82

== Core Ultra (Series 2) ==
=== Arrow Lake-S ===
Common features of Core Ultra (Series 2) desktop processors:

- Socket: LGA 1851.
- Supported chipsets: B860, H810, Q870, Z890.
- All the CPUs support up to dual-channel DDR5-5600 (UDIMM) or DDR5-6400 (CUDIMM) RAM. Additionally Plus models support up to dual-channel DDR5-7200.
- All the CPUs provide 20 lanes of PCIe 5.0 and 4 lanes of PCIe 4.0, but support may vary depending on motherboard and chipsets.
- All CPUs feature a DMI 4.0 8-lane bus to the chipset (PCH).
- All models support: MMX, SSE, SSE2, SSE3, SSSE3, SSE4.1, SSE4.2, AVX, AVX2, AVX-VNNI, FMA3, Intel 64, Intel VT-x
- L1 cache:
  - P-cores: 112 KB (48 KB (12-way) data + 64 KB (16-Way) instructions) per core.
  - E-cores: 96 KB (32 KB (8-way) data + 64 KB (16-Way) instructions) per core.
- L2 cache:
  - P-cores: 3 MB (12-Way) per core.
  - E-cores: 4 MB (16-Way) per E-core cluster (each "cluster" contains four cores).
- Fabrication process: Compute Tile (Contains the CPU cores) TSMC's N3B node.
- K-suffix processors have an unlocked multiplier and can be overclocked.
- Core Ultra 9 and Core Ultra 7 models support Turbo Boost 3.0 on the P-cores, while Core Ultra 5 models only support Turbo Boost 2.0. The turbo clock speeds shown are of the fastest turbo boost version supported by the processor.

Processor branding	Model	P-core (performance)				E-core (efficiency)			Integrated GPU		Smart Cache	NPU (TOPS)	TDP		Release date	MSRP
Processor branding	Model	Cores (Threads)	Clock rate (GHz)			Cores (Threads)	Clock rate (GHz)		Model	Clock (MHz)	Smart Cache	NPU (TOPS)	Base	Max. Turbo	Release date	MSRP
Processor branding	Model	Cores (Threads)	Base	Turbo	TVB	Cores (Threads)	Base	Turbo	Model	Clock (MHz)	Smart Cache	NPU (TOPS)	Base	Max. Turbo	Release date	MSRP
Core Ultra 9	285K	8 (8)	3.7	5.6	5.7	16 (16)	3.2	4.6	Intel Graphics (4 Xe-cores)	300–2000	36 MB	13	125 W	250 W	October 2024	US $589
Core Ultra 9	285	8 (8)	2.5	5.5	5.6	16 (16)	1.9	4.6	Intel Graphics (4 Xe-cores)	300–2000	36 MB	13	65 W	182 W	January 2025	US $549
Core Ultra 9	285T	8 (8)	1.4	5.4	—N/a	16 (16)	1.2	4.6	Intel Graphics (4 Xe-cores)	300–2000	36 MB	13	35 W	112 W	January 2025	US $549
Core Ultra 7	270K Plus	8 (8)	3.7	5.5	—N/a	16 (16)	3.2	4.7	Intel Graphics (4 Xe-cores)	300–2000	36 MB	13	125 W	250 W	March 2026	US $339.00-$349.00
Core Ultra 7	265K	8 (8)	3.9	5.5	—N/a	12 (12)	3.3	4.6	Intel Graphics (4 Xe-cores)	300–2000	30 MB	13	125 W	250 W	October 2024	US $394
Core Ultra 7	265KF	8 (8)	3.9	5.5	—N/a	12 (12)	3.3	4.6	—N/a		30 MB	13	125 W	250 W	October 2024	US $379
Core Ultra 7	265	8 (8)	2.4	5.3	—N/a	12 (12)	1.8	4.6	Intel Graphics (4 Xe-cores)	300–1950	30 MB	13	65 W	182 W	January 2025	US $384
Core Ultra 7	265F	8 (8)	2.4	5.3	—N/a	12 (12)	1.8	4.6	—N/a		30 MB	13	65 W	182 W	January 2025	US $369
Core Ultra 7	265T	8 (8)	1.5	5.3	—N/a	12 (12)	1.2	4.6	Intel Graphics (4 Xe-cores)	300–1950	30 MB	13	35 W	112 W	January 2025	US $384
Core Ultra 7	260K	8 (8)	3.9	5.4	—N/a	12 (12)	3.3	4.5	Intel Graphics (4 Xe-cores)	300–2000	30 MB	13	125 W	250 W	November 2026	OEM
Core Ultra 5	250K Plus	6 (6)	4.2	5.3	—N/a	12 (12)	3.3	4.6	Intel Graphics (4 Xe-cores)	300–1900	30 MB	13	125 W	159 W	March 2026	US $219.00-$229.00
Core Ultra 5	250KF Plus	6 (6)	4.2	5.3	—N/a	12 (12)	3.3	4.6	—N/a		30 MB	13	125 W	159 W	March 2026	US $204.00-$214.00
Core Ultra 5	245K	6 (6)	4.2	5.2	—N/a	8 (8)	3.6	4.6	Intel Graphics (4 Xe-cores)	300–1900	24 MB	13	125 W	159 W	October 2024	US $309
Core Ultra 5	245KF	6 (6)	4.2	5.2	—N/a	8 (8)	3.6	4.6	—N/a		24 MB	13	125 W	159 W	October 2024	US $294
Core Ultra 5	245	6 (6)	3.5	5.1	—N/a	8 (8)	3.0	4.5	Intel Graphics (4 Xe-cores)	300–1900	24 MB	13	65 W	121 W	January 2025	US $270
Core Ultra 5	245T	6 (6)	2.2	5.1	—N/a	8 (8)	1.7	4.5	Intel Graphics (4 Xe-cores)	300–1900	24 MB	13	35 W	114 W	January 2025	US $270
Core Ultra 5	235	6 (6)	3.4	5.0	—N/a	8 (8)	2.9	4.4	Intel Graphics (3 Xe-cores)	300–2000	24 MB	13	65 W	121 W	January 2025	US $247
Core Ultra 5	235T	6 (6)	2.2	5.0	—N/a	8 (8)	1.6	4.4	Intel Graphics (3 Xe-cores)	300–2000	24 MB	13	35 W	114 W	January 2025	US $247
Core Ultra 5	225	6 (6)	3.3	4.9	—N/a	4 (4)	2.7	4.4	Intel Graphics (2 Xe-cores)	300–1800	20 MB	13	65 W	121 W	January 2025	US $236
Core Ultra 5	225F	6 (6)	3.3	4.9	—N/a	4 (4)	2.7	4.4	—N/a		20 MB	13	65 W	121 W	January 2025	US $221
Core Ultra 5	225T	6 (6)	2.5	4.9	—N/a	4 (4)	1.9	4.4	Intel Graphics (2 Xe-cores)	300–1800	20 MB	13	35 W	114 W	January 2025	US $236

== See also ==
- List of Intel Core mobile processors
- List of Intel Pentium M microprocessors
- List of Intel Celeron processors
- List of Intel Pentium processors
- Intel Core
- Intel Core 2
- Comparison of Intel processors
- Enhanced Pentium M (microarchitecture)
- Intel Core (microarchitecture)
- Penryn (microarchitecture)
- Alder Lake (microprocessor)
