= Crippleware =

Product with intentionally limited features in favor of a more expensive version

Crippleware is computer software or hardware that has been intentionally designed to have some of its features disabled or not working to its full capability until payment of some kind is rendered despite the internal presence of these features behind the scenes.

In software, crippleware means that "vital features of the program such as printing or the ability to save files are disabled until the user purchases a registration key". While crippleware allows consumers to see the software before they buy, they are unable to test its complete functionality because of the disabled functions.

Hardware crippleware is "a hardware device that has not been designed to its full capability". The functionality of the hardware device is limited to encourage consumers to pay for a more expensive upgraded version. Usually the hardware device considered to be crippleware can be upgraded to better or its full potential by way of a trivial change, such as removing a jumper wire. The manufacturer would most likely release the crippleware as a low-end or economy version of their product.

== Computer software ==
Deliberately limited programs are usually freeware versions of computer programs that lack the most advanced (or even crucial) features of the original program. Limited versions are made available in order to increase the popularity of the full program (by making it more desirable) without giving it away for free. Examples include a word processor that cannot save or print, and unwanted features, for example screencasting and video editing software programs applying a watermark (often a logo) onto the video screen. However, crippleware programs can also differentiate between tiers of paying software customers.

The term "crippleware" is sometimes used to describe software products whose functions have been limited (or "crippled") with the sole purpose of encouraging or requiring the user to pay for those functions (either by paying a one-time fee or an ongoing subscription fee).

The less derogatory term, from a shareware software producer's perspective, is feature-limited. Feature-limited is merely one mechanism for marketing shareware as a damaged good; others are time-limited, usage-limited, capacity-limited, nagware and output-limited. From the producer's standpoint, feature-limited allows customers to try software with no commitment instead of relying on questionable or possibly staged reviews. Try-before-you-buy applications are very prevalent for mobile devices, with the additional damaged good of ad-displays as well as all of the other forms of damaged-good applications.

From an Open Source software providers perspective, there is the model of open core which includes a feature-limited version of the product and an open-core version. The feature-limited version can be used widely; this approach is used by products like MySQL and Eucalyptus.

== Computer hardware ==
This product differentiation strategy has also been used in hardware products:

- The Intel 486SX which was a 486DX with the FPU removed or in early versions present but disabled.
- AMD disabled defective cores on their quad-core Phenom and Phenom II X4 processor dies to make cheaper triple-core Phenom and Phenom II X3 and dual-core X2 models without the expense of designing new chips. Quad-core dies with one or two faulty cores can be used as triple- or dual-core processors rather than being discarded, increasing yield. Some users have managed to "unlock" these crippled cores, when not faulty.
- Casio's fx-82ES scientific calculator uses the same ROM as the fx-991ES (a model with enhanced functionality), and can be made to act as the latter by strategically cutting through the epoxy on the board, and tracing the exposed solder joints using a pencil. This is also the case with the fx-83ES and the fx-85ES.
- Apple announcing it would charge $4.99 in order to enable Wi-Fi on some devices in 2007 (fee later reduced to $1.99) and blamed it on GAAP compliance, even though their interpretation of the accounting rules as mandating a fee was contradicted by a former chief accountant of the SEC and by a member of the Financial Accounting Standards Board.
- Intel Upgrade Service (2010-2011), which allowed select types of processors to be upgraded via a software activation code, has also been criticized in such terms.
- Apple secretly slowed down older iPhones in a controversy dubbed "batterygate". Apple's official reasoning was that devices with degraded batteries had their performance adjusted to avoid unexpected shutdowns. They settled a consumer fraud lawsuit in 2020 for 113 million dollars.

== Automobiles ==
Tesla limits the range on lower-end versions of the Model S in software, as well as disabling Autopilot functions if those functions weren't purchased.

Some high-end BMW cars in the United Kingdom, Germany, New Zealand, and South Africa have the option to pay a subscription fee for features such as heated seats, advanced cruise control, and automatic beam switching. The components and functionality already exist within the vehicle, but BMW has a software block that prevents them from being used without paying.

== Digital rights management ==
Digital rights management is another example of this product differentiation strategy. Digital files are inherently capable of being copied perfectly in unlimited quantities; digital rights management aims to deter copyright infringement by using hardware or cryptographic techniques to limit copying or playback.

== See also ==
- Defective by Design
- Dongle
- Walled garden (technology)
- Planned obsolescence
- Enshittification
- Shareware
- Regional lockout
