= List of Intel Pentium processors =

Logo from 1993

The latest standard badge design used by Intel to promote the Pentium brand

The Intel Pentium brand was a line of mainstream x86-architecture microprocessors from Intel. Processors branded Pentium Processor with MMX Technology (and referred to as Pentium MMX for brevity) are also listed here. It was replaced by the Intel Processor brand in 2023.

== Desktop processors ==
=== P5 based Pentiums ===
==== "P5" (800 nm) ====
- Based on P5
- Steppings: B1, C1, D1 (Note: D1 stepping processors do not have FDIV bug)

Model	Clock rate	L1 cache	FSB	Mult.	Voltage	TDP	Socket	Release date	Part number(s)	sSpec number
Pentium 50	50 MHz	8 + 8 KB	50 MT/s	1×	5 V		Socket 4		A80500-50	Q0399 (B1) These are engineering samples only. CPUID = 0513h
Pentium 60	60 MHz	8 + 8 KB	60 MT/s	1×	5 V	14.6 W	Socket 4	March 22, 1993	A80501-60; PCPU5V60	Q0352, Q0394, Q0400, Q0412, SX753, SX842 (B1), Q0466, SX835, SZ949 (C1), Q0625, SX948, SX974 (D1), SX926
Pentium 66	67 MHz	8 + 8 KB	66 MT/s	1×	5.15 V	16 W	Socket 4	March 22, 1993	A80501-66; PCPU5V66	Q0353, Q0395, Q0413, SX754, SX828 (B1), Q0467, SX836, SX837, SZ950 (C1), Q0626, Q0627, SX949, SX950 (D1)

==== "P54C" (600 nm) ====
- Based on P5 microarchitecture
- Steppings: B1, B3, B5, C2, E0 (Note: D1 stepping processors do not have FDIV bug)

Model	Clock rate	L1 cache	FSB	Mult.	Voltage	TDP	Socket	Release date	Part number(s)	sSpec number
Pentium 75	75 MHz	8 + 8 KB	50 MT/s	1.5×	3.135–3.6 V	8 W	Socket 5; Socket 7	October 10, 1994	A80502-75; BP80502-75; PCPU3V75	Q0601, SX878 (B1), Q0666, Q0704, SX961, SX975, SX977 (B5), Q0700, Q0725, Q0749, SX969, SX998, SK079 (C2), Q0837, Q0846, SY005, SY009, SU097, SU098 (E0)
Pentium 90	90 MHz	8 + 8 KB	60 MT/s	1.5×	3.135–3.6 V	9 W	Socket 5; Socket 7	March 7, 1994	A80502-90; BP80502-90; PCPU3V90	Q0542, Q0613, Q0543, SX879, SX885, SX909, SX874 (B1), Q0628, Q0611, Q0612, SX923, SX922, SX921, SX942, SX943, SX944, SZ951 (B3), Q0653, Q0654, Q0655, SX957, SX958, SX959, SX978 (B5), Q0668, SX999, SZ995, SU031 (C2), Q0783, SY006, SL2WW (E0)
Pentium 100	100 MHz	8 + 8 KB	50 MT/s	2×			Socket 5; Socket 7			
Pentium 100	100 MHz	8 + 8 KB	66 MT/s	1.5×	3.135–3.6 V	10.1 W	Socket 5; Socket 7	March 7, 1994	A80502100; A80502-100; BP80502100; BP80502-100; BOXBP80502-100; PCPU3V100	Q0563, Q0587, Q0614, SX886, SX910 (B1), Q0677, SX960 (B3), Q0656, Q0657, Q0658, SX962 (B5), Q0697, Q0698, SX963, SX970, SZ996, SU032 (C2), Q0784, SY007, SU099, SU110 (E0)
Embedded Pentium 100	100 MHz	8 + 8 KB	66 MT/s	1.5×	3.135–3.6 V	10.1 W			A80502100	SL2TU (cC0)

==== "P54CQS" (350 nm) ====
- Based on P5 microarchitecture

Model	Clock rate	L1 cache	FSB	Mult.	Voltage	TDP	Socket	Release date	Part number(s)	sSpec number
Pentium 120	120 MHz	8 + 8 KB	60 MT/s	2×	3.135–3.6 V	12.81 W	Socket 5; Socket 7	March 27, 1995	A80502120; A80502-120; BP80502120; BP80502-120	Q0711, Q0732, SU033, SK086, SX994 (C2), Q0785, SY033, SU100 (E0)

==== "P54CS" (350 nm) ====
- Based on P5 microarchitecture

Model	Clock rate	L1 cache	FSB	Mult.	Voltage	TDP	Socket	Release date	Part number(s)	sSpec number
Pentium 133	133 MHz	8 + 8 KB	66 MT/s	2×	3.135–3.6 V	11.2 W	Socket 7	June 1, 1995	A80502133; A80502-133; BP80502133; BOXBP80502-133	S106J, SK098 (C2), SK106 (cB1), SK106J (cB1), SK107 (cB1), SY022 (cC0), SY023 (cC0), SY082, SY126, SL22Q (cC0), SL25L (cC0), SU038 (cB1), SU073 (cC0)
Pentium 150	150 MHz	8 + 8 KB	60 MT/s	2.5×	3.135–3.6 V	11.6 W	Socket 7	January 4, 1996	A80502150; BP80502150; BOXBP80502-150	SY015 (cC0), SU071 (cC0), SU122 (cC0)
Pentium 166	167 MHz	8 + 8 KB	66 MT/s	2.5×	3.135–3.6 V	14.5 W	Socket 7	January 4, 1996	A80502166; BP80502166; BOXBP80502-166; FV80502166	SL24R (cC0), SY016 (cC0), SY017 (cC0), SY055 (cC0), SU072 (cC0), SY037 (cC0)
Pentium 200	200 MHz	8 + 8 KB	66 MT/s	3×	3.135–3.6 V	15.5 W	Socket 7	June 10, 1996	A80502200; BP80502200; BOXBP80502-200; FV80502200	SL25H (cC0), SU114 (cC0), SL24Q (cC0), SY044 (cC0), SY045 (cC0)
Embedded Pentium 133	133 MHz	8 + 8 KB	66 MT/s	2×	3.135–3.6 V	11.2 W			A80502133	SY022 (cC0)
Embedded Pentium 133 with VRE	133 MHz	8 + 8 KB	66 MT/s	2×	Core=3.1 I/O=3.3 V	7.9 (Max.12.25) W	Socket 7		A80502133	SY028 (mcC0)
Embedded Pentium 166	167 MHz	8 + 8 KB	66 MT/s	2.5×	3.135–3.6 V	14.5 W			A80502166	SY016 (cC0)

==== "P55C" (350 nm) ====
- Based on P5 microarchitecture

Model	Clock rate	L1 cache	FSB	Mult.	Voltage	TDP	Socket	Release date	Part number(s)	sSpec number
Pentium MMX 166	167 MHz	16 + 16 KB	66 MT/s	2.5×	2.7–2.9 V	13.1 W	Socket 7	January 8, 1997	A80503166; BP80503166; FV80503166	SL239 (xA3), SL26V (xA3), SL27K (xB1), SL27X (xB1), SL23R (xA3), SL23T (xA3), SL23V (xB1), SL23X (xB1), SL25M (xA3), SL2FP (xB1), SL2HU (xA3), SL2HX (xB1), SL26H (xA3), SL27H (xB1), SL27M, SY059 (xA3)
Pentium MMX 200	200 MHz	16 + 16 KB	66 MT/s	3×	2.7–2.9 V	15.7 W	Socket 7	January 8, 1997	A80503200; BP80503200; FV80503200	SL2RY (xB1), SL23S (xA3), SL23W (xB1), SL25N (xA3), SL26Q (xA3), SL274 (xA3), SL28J, SL2FQ (xB1), SL2S9 (xB1), SL26J (xA3), SL27J (xB1), SL2Z8, SY060 (xA3)
Pentium MMX 233	233 MHz	16 + 16 KB	66 MT/s	3.5×	2.7–2.9 V	17 W	Socket 7	June 2, 1997	BP80503233; FV80503233	SL293 (xB1), SL2BM (xB1), SL27S (xB1)
Embedded Pentium MMX 200	200 MHz	16 + 16 KB	66 MT/s	3×	3.135–3.6 V	15.7 W	Socket 7	September 29, 1997	FV80503200	SL27J (xB1)
Embedded Pentium MMX 233	233 MHz	16 + 16 KB	66 MT/s	3.5×	3.135–3.6 V	17 W	Socket 7	?	FV80503233	SL27S (xB1)

=== P6 based Pentiums ===
Desktop processors based on the P6 microarchitecture were marketed as Pentium Pro, Pentium II and Pentium III, as well as variations of these names.

=== NetBurst based Pentiums ===
Desktop processors based on the NetBurst microarchitecture were marketed as Pentium 4 and Pentium D.

=== Core based Pentiums ===
Prior desktop processors based on the Core microarchitecture were marketed as Pentium Dual-Core, while the latest models were named Pentium. Note however, that several resellers will still refer to the newer generation processors as Pentium Dual-Core.

==== "Allendale", "Conroe" (65 nm) ====
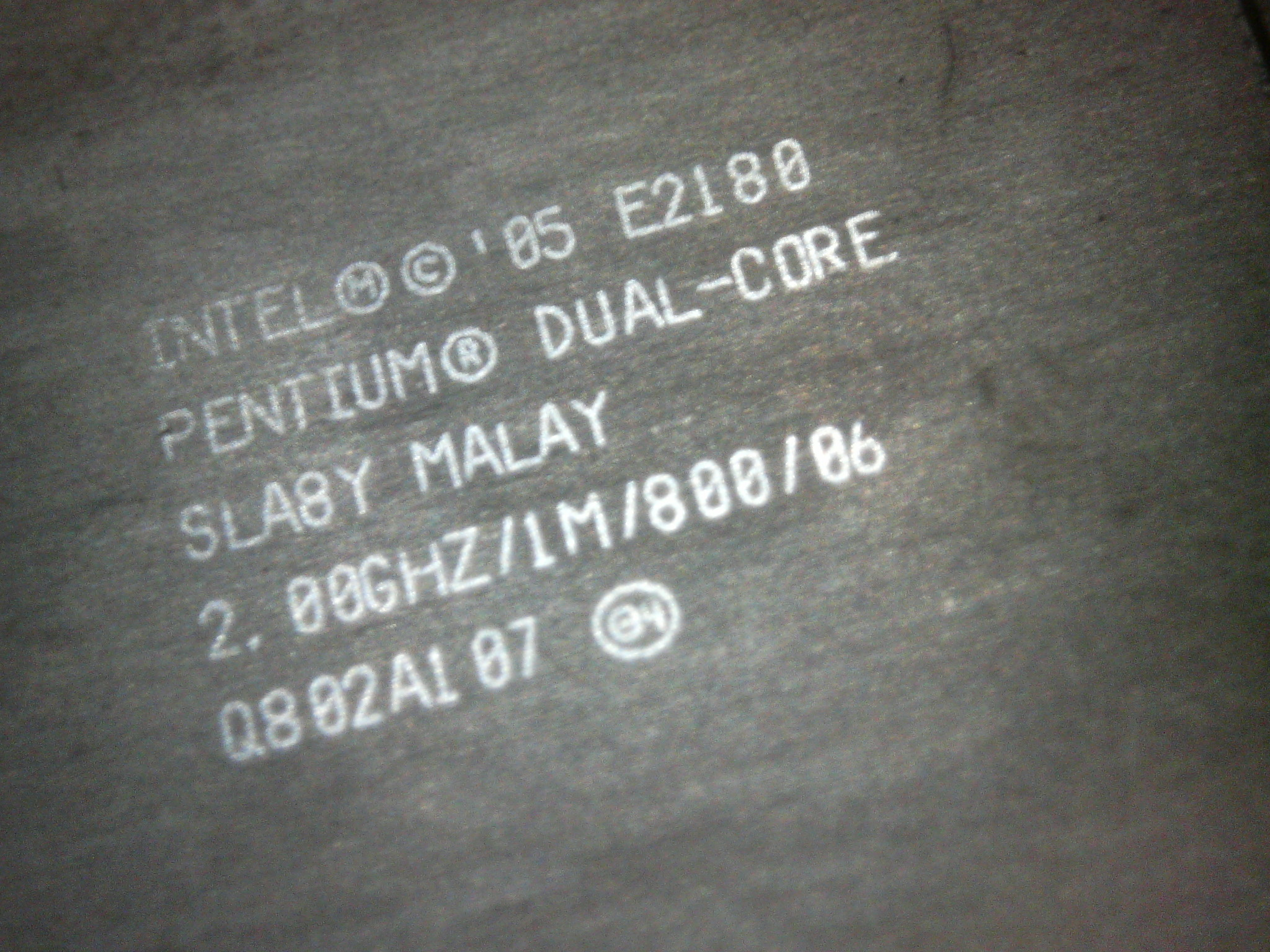
Intel Pentium E2180 @ 2.00GHz closeup

The Intel Pentium Dual-Core processors, E2140, E2160, E2180, E2200, and E2220 use the Allendale core, which includes 2 MB of native L2 cache, with half disabled leaving only 1 MB. This compares to the higher end Conroe core which features 4 MB L2 Cache natively. Intel has shifted its product lines having the Core 2 line as Mainstream/Performance, Pentium Dual-Core as Mainstream, and the new Celeron (based on the Conroe-L core) as Budget/Value.

- Based on the 64-bit Core microarchitecture.
- All models support: MMX, SSE, SSE2, SSE3, SSSE3, Enhanced Intel SpeedStep Technology (EIST), Intel 64, XD bit (an NX bit implementation)
- Die size: 77 mm² (Allendale-1M), 111 mm² (Allendale), 143 mm² (Conroe)
- Steppings: L2, M0 (Allendale), G0 (Conroe)

Model	sSpec number	Cores	Clock rate	L2 cache	FSB	Mult.	Voltage	TDP	Socket	Release date	Part number(s)	Release price (USD)
Pentium Dual-Core E2140	SLA3J (L2); SLA93 (M0); SLALS (G0)	2	1.6 GHz	1 MB	800 MT/s	8×	1.162–1.312 V	65 W	LGA 775	June 3, 2007	HH80557PG0251M	
Pentium Dual-Core E2160	SLA3H (L2); SLA8Z (M0); SLA9Z (G0); SLASX (G0)	2	1.8 GHz	1 MB	800 MT/s	9×	1.162–1.312 V	65 W	LGA 775	June 3, 2007	HH80557PG0331M	
Pentium Dual-Core E2180	SLA8Y (M0)	2	2 GHz	1 MB	800 MT/s	10×	0.85–1.50 V	65 W	LGA 775	August 26, 2007	HH80557PG0411M	
Pentium Dual-Core E2200	SLA8X (M0); SLAM4 (M0)	2	2.2 GHz	1 MB	800 MT/s	11×	0.85–1.50 V	65 W	LGA 775	December 2, 2007	HH80557PG0491M	
Pentium Dual-Core E2220	SLA8W (M0)	2	2.4 GHz	1 MB	800 MT/s	12×	0.85–1.50 V	65 W	LGA 775	March 2, 2008	HH80557PG0561M	

==== "Wolfdale-3M" (45 nm) ====
The E5000 series and E6000 series use the same 45 nm Wolfdale-3M core as the E7000 series Core 2s, which has 3 MB L2 cache natively. 1 MB of L2 cache is disabled, for a total of 2 MB L2 cache, or twice the amount in the original Allendale Pentiums. The Wolfdale core is capable of SSE4, but it is disabled in these Pentiums. Pentium E2210 is an OEM processor based on Wolfdale-3M with only 1 MB L2 cache enabled out of the total 3 MB.

- All models support: MMX, SSE, SSE2, SSE3, SSSE3, Enhanced Intel SpeedStep Technology (EIST), Intel 64, XD bit (an NX bit implementation)
- Die size: 82 mm²
- Steppings: R0
- Based on the Penryn microarchitecture
- Part of 3MB L2 Cache Disabled
- E2210 is a Wolfdale-3M with 2MB cache disabled unlike all other E22xx, which are Allendale.
- E5000-series processors were initially known as Pentium Dual-Core, while all later processors were just Pentium.
- E6500K has unlocked multiplier, and is only available in China as limited edition.
- Models with a part number ending in "ML" support Intel VT-x.

Model	sSpec number	Cores	Clock rate	L2 cache	FSB	Mult.	Voltage	TDP	Socket	Release date	Part number(s)	Release price (USD)
Dual Core
Pentium Dual-Core E2210	SLB7N (M0); SLB9R (R0)	2	2.2 GHz	1 MB	800 MT/s	11×	0.85–1.3625 V	65 W	LGA 775	Q2, 2009	EU80571RG0491M; AT80571RG0491M	
Pentium Dual-Core E5200	SLAY7 (M0); SLB9T (R0)	2	2.5 GHz	2 MB	800 MT/s	12.5×	0.85–1.3625 V	65 W	LGA 775	August 31, 2008	EU80571PG0602M; AT80571PG0602M; BX80571E5200; BXC80571E5200	
Pentium Dual-Core E5300	SLB9U (R0); SLGQ6 (R0); SLGTL (R0, with VT)	2	2.6 GHz	2 MB	800 MT/s	13×	0.85–1.3625 V	65 W	LGA 775	November 30, 2008	AT80571PG0642M; AT80571PG0642ML; BX80571E5300; BXC80571E5300	
Pentium E5400	SLB9V (R0); SLGTK (R0, with VT)	2	2.7 GHz	2 MB	800 MT/s	13.5×	0.85–1.3625 V	65 W	LGA 775	January 18, 2009	AT80571PG0682M; AT80571PG0682ML; BX80571E5400; BXC80571E5400	
Pentium E5500	SLGGY (R0); SLGTJ (R0, with VT)	2	2.8 GHz	2 MB	800 MT/s	14×	0.85–1.3625 V	65 W	LGA 775	April 18, 2010	AT80571PG0722M; AT80571PG0722ML; BX80571E5500; BXC80571E5500	
Pentium E5700	SLGTH (R0, with VT)	2	3 GHz	2 MB	800 MT/s	15×	0.85–1.3625 V	65 W	LGA 775	August 8, 2010	AT80571PG0802ML; BX80571E5700; BXC80571E5700	
Pentium E5800	SLGTG (R0, with VT)	2	3.2 GHz	2 MB	800 MT/s	16×	0.85–1.3625 V	65 W	LGA 775	November 28, 2010	AT80571PG0882ML; BX80571E5800; BXC80571E5800	
Pentium E6300	SLGU9 (R0)	2	2.8 GHz	2 MB	1066 MT/s	10.5×	0.85–1.3625 V	65 W	LGA 775	May 9, 2009	AT80571PH0722ML; BX80571E6300	
Pentium E6500	SLGUH (R0); SLGVZ (R0)	2	2.93 GHz	2 MB	1066 MT/s	11×	0.85–1.3625 V	65 W	LGA 775	August 9, 2009	AT80571PH0772ML; BX80571E6500	
Pentium E6500K	SLGYP (R0)	2	2.93 GHz	2 MB	1066 MT/s	11×	0.85–1.3625 V	65 W	LGA 775	August 9, 2009	AT80571XH0722ML	
Pentium E6600	SLGUG (R0)	2	3.07 GHz	2 MB	1066 MT/s	11.5×	0.85–1.3625 V	65 W	LGA 775	January 17, 2010	AT80571PH0832ML; BX80571E6600	
Pentium E6700	SLGUF (R0)	2	3.2 GHz	2 MB	1066 MT/s	12×	0.85–1.3625 V	65 W	LGA 775	May 30, 2010	AT80571PH0882ML; BX80571E6700	
Pentium E6800	SLGUE (R0)	2	3.33 GHz	2 MB	1066 MT/s	12.5×	0.85–1.3625 V	65 W	LGA 775	August 29, 2010	BX80571E6800; AT80571PH0932ML	

=== Westmere based Pentiums ===
==== "Clarkdale" (MCP, 32 nm) ====
- Note that these are also dual core, but under the Pentium brand.
- Based on Westmere microarchitecture
- All models support: MMX, SSE, SSE2, SSE3, SSSE3, Enhanced Intel SpeedStep Technology (EIST), Intel 64, XD bit (an NX bit implementation), Intel VT-x, Smart Cache.
- Contains 45 nm "Ironlake" GPU.
- G6951 can be unlocked to enable Hyper-threading and an extra 1MB of L3 cache, which are present in the CPU but deliberately disabled, with the purchase of a $50 upgrade card by way of the Intel Upgrade Service.

Model	sSpec number	Clock rate	Turbo	GPU frequency	Cores	L2 cache	L3 cache	I/O bus	Mult.	Memory	Voltage	TDP	Socket	Release date	Part number(s)	Release price (USD)
Dual Core
Pentium G6950	SLBMS (C2); SLBTG (K0)	2.8 GHz	—N/a	533 MHz	2	2 × 256 KB	3 MB	DMI	21×	2 × DDR3-1066	0.65–1.4 V	73 W	LGA 1156	January 7, 2010	CM80616004593AE; BX80616G6950; BXC80616G6950	
Pentium G6951	SLBMR (C2); SLBTF (K0)	2.8 GHz	—N/a	533 MHz	2	2 × 256 KB	3 MB	DMI	21×	2 × DDR3-1066	0.65–1.4 V	73 W	LGA 1156	Q3 2010	CM80616004593AF; BX80616G6951	
Pentium G6960	SLBT6 (K0)	2.93 GHz	—N/a	533 MHz	2	2 × 256 KB	3 MB	DMI	22×	2 × DDR3-1066	0.65–1.4 V	73 W	LGA 1156	January 9, 2011	CM80616005373AA	

=== Sandy Bridge based Pentiums ===
==== "Sandy Bridge" (32 nm) ====
- Similarly to the G6000 series, the G6xx and G8xx series are also dual core, but under the Pentium brand.
- All models support: MMX, SSE, SSE2, SSE3, SSSE3, SSE4.1, SSE4.2, Enhanced Intel SpeedStep Technology (EIST), Intel 64, XD bit (an NX bit implementation), Intel VT-x, Smart Cache.
- Pentium G8xx supports DDR3-1333 in addition to DDR3-1066.
- HD Graphics (Sandy Bridge) contain 6 EUs as well as HD Graphics 2000, but does not support the following technologies: Intel Quick Sync Video, InTru3D, Intel Clear Video HD, Wireless display, Intel insider.
- Transistors: 504 million
- Die size: 131 mm²
- The Pentium G622, once upgraded via Intel Upgrade Service, operates at 3.2 GHz, has 3 MB L3 cache and is recognized as Pentium G693.
- The Pentium G632, once upgraded via Intel Upgrade Service, operates at 3.3 GHz, has 3 MB L3 cache and is recognized as Pentium G694.

Model	sSpec number	Cores	Clock rate	Turbo	L2 cache	L3 cache	GPU model	GPU frequency	TDP	Socket	I/O bus	Release date	Part number(s)	Release price (USD)
standard power
Pentium G620	SR05R (Q0)	2	2.6 GHz	—N/a	2 × 256 KB	3 MB	Intel Graphics Technology (6 EUs)	850–1100 MHz	65 W	LGA 1155	DMI 2.0	May 22, 2011	CM8062301046304; BX80623G620; BXC80623G620	
Pentium G622	SR05M (Q0)	2	2.6 GHz	—N/a	2 × 256 KB	3 MB	HD Graphics (6 EUs)	850–1100 MHz	65 W	LGA 1155	DMI 2.0	May 22, 2011	CM8062301049115; BX80623G622	
Pentium G630	SR05S (Q0)	2	2.7 GHz	—N/a	2 × 256 KB	3 MB	HD Graphics (6 EUs)	850–1100 MHz	65 W	LGA 1155	DMI 2.0	September 4, 2011	CM8062301046404; BX80623G630; BXC80623G630	
Pentium G632	SR05N (Q0)	2	2.7 GHz	—N/a	2 × 256 KB	3 MB	HD Graphics (6 EUs)	850–1100 MHz	65 W	LGA 1155	DMI 2.0	September 4, 2011	CM8062301049304	
Pentium G640	SR059 (Q0)	2	2.8 GHz	—N/a	2 × 256 KB	3 MB	HD Graphics (6 EUs)	850–1100 MHz	65 W	LGA 1155	DMI 2.0	June 3, 2012	CM8062307260314; BX80623G640; BXC80623G640	
Pentium G645	SR0RS (Q0)	2	2.9 GHz	—N/a	2 × 256 KB	3 MB	HD Graphics (6 EUs)	850–1100 MHz	65 W	LGA 1155	DMI 2.0	September 2, 2012	CM8062301262601; BX80623G645; BXC80623G645	
Pentium G840	SR05P (Q0)	2	2.8 GHz	—N/a	2 × 256 KB	3 MB	HD Graphics (6 EUs)	850–1100 MHz	65 W	LGA 1155	DMI 2.0	May 22, 2011	CM8062301046104; BX80623G840; BXC80623G840	
Pentium G850	SR05Q (Q0)	2	2.9 GHz	—N/a	2 × 256 KB	3 MB	HD Graphics (6 EUs)	850–1100 MHz	65 W	LGA 1155	DMI 2.0	May 22, 2011	CM8062301046204; BX80623G850; BXC80623G850	
Pentium G860	SR058 (Q0)	2	3 GHz	—N/a	2 × 256 KB	3 MB	HD Graphics (6 EUs)	850–1100 MHz	65 W	LGA 1155	DMI 2.0	September 4, 2011	CM8062307260237; BX80623G860	
Pentium G870	SR057 (Q0)	2	3.1 GHz	—N/a	2 × 256 KB	3 MB	HD Graphics (6 EUs)	850–1100 MHz	65 W	LGA 1155	DMI 2.0	June 3, 2012	CM8062307260115; BX80623G870	
ultra low power
Pentium G620T	SR05T (Q0)	2	2.2 GHz	—N/a	2 × 256 KB	3 MB	HD Graphics (6 EUs)	650–1100 MHz	35 W	LGA 1155	DMI 2.0	May 22, 2011	CM8062301046504; BX80623G620T; BXC80623G620T	
Pentium G630T	SR05U (Q0)	2	2.3 GHz	—N/a	2 × 256 KB	3 MB	HD Graphics (6 EUs)	650–1100 MHz	35 W	LGA 1155	DMI 2.0	September 4, 2011	CM8062301046604; BX80623G630T	
Pentium G640T	SR066 (Q0)	2	2.4 GHz	—N/a	2 × 256 KB	3 MB	HD Graphics (6 EUs)	650–1100 MHz	35 W	LGA 1155	DMI 2.0	June 3, 2012	CM8062301002204; BX80623G640T	
Pentium G645T	SR0S0 (Q0)	2	2.5 GHz	—N/a	2 × 256 KB	3 MB	HD Graphics (6 EUs)	650–1100 MHz	35 W	LGA 1155	DMI 2.0	September 2, 2012	CM8062301263701	
Pentium G860T	SR0MF (Q0)	2	2.6 GHz	—N/a	2 × 256 KB	3 MB	HD Graphics (6 EUs)	650–1100 MHz	35 W	LGA 1155	DMI 2.0	June 3, 2012	CM8062301198300	

=== Ivy Bridge based Pentiums ===
Intel Pentium G2020 Ivy Bridge die shot

==== "Ivy Bridge" (22 nm) ====
- All models support: MMX, SSE, SSE2, SSE3, SSSE3, SSE4.1, SSE4.2, Enhanced Intel SpeedStep Technology (EIST), Intel 64, XD bit (an NX bit implementation), Intel VT-x, Smart Cache.
- G20xx support up to DDR3-1333 memory while G21xx support up to DDR3-1600.
- HD Graphics (Ivy Bridge) contain 6 EUs as well as HD Graphics 2500, but does not support the following technologies: Intel Quick Sync Video, InTru3D, Intel Clear Video HD, Wireless display, Intel insider.

Model	sSpec number	Cores	Clock rate	Turbo	L2 cache	L3 cache	GPU model	GPU frequency	TDP	Socket	I/O bus	Release date	Part number(s)	Release price (USD)
standard power
Pentium G2010	SR10J (P0)	2	2.8 GHz	—N/a	2 × 256 KB	3 MB	Intel Graphics Technology (6 EUs)	650-1050 MHz	55 W	LGA 1155	DMI 2.0	January 20, 2013	CM8063701444800; BX80637G2010; BXC80637G2010	
Pentium G2020	SR10H (P0)	2	2.9 GHz	—N/a	2 × 256 KB	3 MB	HD Graphics (6 EUs)	650-1050 MHz	55 W	LGA 1155	DMI 2.0	January 20, 2013	CM8063701444700; BX80637G2020; BXC80637G2020	
Pentium G2030	SR163 (P0)	2	3 GHz	—N/a	2 × 256 KB	3 MB	HD Graphics (6 EUs)	650-1050 MHz	55 W	LGA 1155	DMI 2.0	June 9, 2013	CM8063701450000; BX80637G2030; BXC80637G2030	
Pentium G2120	SR0UF (P0)	2	3.1 GHz	—N/a	2 × 256 KB	3 MB	HD Graphics (6 EUs)	650-1050 MHz	55 W	LGA 1155	DMI 2.0	September 2, 2012	CM8063701095801; BX80637G2120; BXC80637G2120	
Pentium G2130	SR0YU (P0)	2	3.2 GHz	—N/a	2 × 256 KB	3 MB	HD Graphics (6 EUs)	650-1050 MHz	55 W	LGA 1155	DMI 2.0	January 20, 2013	CM8063701391200; BX80637G2130; BXC80637G2130	
Pentium G2140	SR0YT (P0)	2	3.3 GHz	—N/a	2 × 256 KB	3 MB	HD Graphics (6 EUs)	650-1050 MHz	55 W	LGA 1155	DMI 2.0	June 9, 2013	CM8063701391100; BX80637G2140; BXC80637G2140	
low power
Pentium G2020T	SR10G (P0)	2	2.5 GHz	—N/a	2 × 256 KB	3 MB	HD Graphics (6 EUs)	650-1050 MHz	35 W	LGA 1155	DMI 2.0	January 20, 2013	CM8063701444601	
Pentium G2030T	SR164 (P0)	2	2.6 GHz	—N/a	2 × 256 KB	3 MB	HD Graphics (6 EUs)	650-1050 MHz	35 W	LGA 1155	DMI 2.0	June 9, 2013	CM8063701450500	
Pentium G2100T	SR0UJ (P0)	2	2.6 GHz	—N/a	2 × 256 KB	3 MB	HD Graphics (6 EUs)	650-1050 MHz	35 W	LGA 1155	DMI 2.0	September 2, 2012	CM8063701219000	
Pentium G2120T	SR0YV (P0)	2	2.7 GHz	—N/a	2 × 256 KB	3 MB	HD Graphics (6 EUs)	650-1050 MHz	35 W	LGA 1155	DMI 2.0	June 9, 2013	CM8063701391600	

=== Haswell based Pentiums ===
Intel Celeron G3220 die shot

==== "Haswell-DT" (22 nm) ====
- All models support: MMX, SSE, SSE2, SSE3, SSSE3, SSE4.1, SSE4.2, Enhanced Intel SpeedStep Technology (EIST), Intel 64, XD bit (an NX bit implementation), Intel VT-x, Smart Cache.
- G32xx support up to DDR3-1333 memory while G34xx support up to DDR3-1600.
- G3258 (Pentium anniversary edition) has unlocked CPU multiplier.
- Haswell Pentiums support Quick Sync Video.
- Transistors: 1.4 billion
- Die size: 177mm²

Model	sSpec number	Cores	Clock rate	Turbo	L2 cache	L3 cache	GPU model	GPU frequency	TDP	Socket	I/O bus	Release date	Part number(s)	Release price (USD)
standard power
Pentium G3220	SR1CG (C0); SR1RK (C0)	2	3 GHz	—N/a	2 × 256 KB	3 MB	Intel Graphics Technology (10 EUs)	350–1100 MHz	53 W	LGA 1150	DMI 2.0	September 2013	CM8064601482519; CM8064601562017; BX80646G3220; BXC80646G3220	
Pentium G3240	SR1K6 (C0); SR1RL (C0)	2	3.1 GHz	—N/a	2 × 256 KB	3 MB	HD Graphics (10 EUs)	350–1100 MHz	53 W	LGA 1150	DMI 2.0	May 2014	CM8064601482507; CM8064601562018; BX80646G3240; BXC80646G3240	
Pentium G3250	SR1K7 (C0)	2	3.2 GHz	—N/a	2 × 256 KB	3 MB	HD Graphics (10 EUs)	350–1100 MHz	53 W	LGA 1150	DMI 2.0	July 2014	CM8064601482514; BX80646G3250; BXC80646G3250	
Pentium G3258	SR1V0 (C0)	2	3.2 GHz	—N/a	2 × 256 KB	3 MB	HD Graphics (10 EUs)	350–1100 MHz	53 W	LGA 1150	DMI 2.0	June 2014	CM8064601482573; BX80646G3258; BXC80646G3258	
Pentium G3260	SR1K8 (C0)	2	3.3 GHz	—N/a	2 × 256 KB	3 MB	HD Graphics (10 EUs)	350–1100 MHz	53 W	LGA 1150	DMI 2.0	March 2015	CM8064601482506; BX80646G3260; BXC80646G3260	
Pentium G3420	SR1NB (C0)	2	3.2 GHz	—N/a	2 × 256 KB	3 MB	HD Graphics (10 EUs)	350–1150 MHz	53 W	LGA 1150	DMI 2.0	September 2013	CM8064601482522; BX80646G3420; BXC80646G3420	
Pentium G3430	SR1CE (C0)	2	3.3 GHz	—N/a	2 × 256 KB	3 MB	HD Graphics (10 EUs)	350–1100 MHz	53 W	LGA 1150	DMI 2.0	September 2013	CM8064601482518; BX80646G3430; BXC80646G3430	
Pentium G3440	SR1P9 (C0)	2	3.3 GHz	—N/a	2 × 256 KB	3 MB	HD Graphics (10 EUs)	350–1100 MHz	53 W	LGA 1150	DMI 2.0	May 2014	CM8064601482563; BX80646G3440	
Pentium G3450	SR1K2 (C0)	2	3.4 GHz	—N/a	2 × 256 KB	3 MB	HD Graphics (10 EUs)	350–1100 MHz	53 W	LGA 1150	DMI 2.0	May 2014	CM8064601482505; BX80646G3450	
Pentium G3460	SR1K3 (C0)	2	3.5 GHz	—N/a	2 × 256 KB	3 MB	HD Graphics (10 EUs)	350–1100 MHz	53 W	LGA 1150	DMI 2.0	July 2014	CM8064601482508; BX80646G3460	
Pentium G3470	SR1K4 (C0)	2	3.6 GHz	—N/a	2 × 256 KB	3 MB	HD Graphics (10 EUs)	350–1100 MHz	53 W	LGA 1150	DMI 2.0	March 2015	CM8064601482520; BX80646G3470	
low power
Pentium G3220T	SR1CL (C0)	2	2.6 GHz	—N/a	2 × 256 KB	3 MB	HD Graphics (10 EUs)	200–1100 MHz	35 W	LGA 1150	DMI 2.0	September 2013	CM8064601483713	
Pentium G3240T	SR1KU (C0)	2	2.7 GHz	—N/a	2 × 256 KB	3 MB	HD Graphics (10 EUs)	200–1100 MHz	35 W	LGA 1150	DMI 2.0	May 2014	CM8064601483722	
Pentium G3250T	SR1KV (C0)	2	2.8 GHz	—N/a	2 × 256 KB	3 MB	HD Graphics (10 EUs)	200–1100 MHz	35 W	LGA 1150	DMI 2.0	July 2014	CM8064601483718	
Pentium G3260T	SR1KW (C0)	2	2.9 GHz	—N/a	2 × 256 KB	3 MB	HD Graphics (10 EUs)	200–1100 MHz	35 W	LGA 1150	DMI 2.0	March 2015	CM8064601483744	
Pentium G3420T	SR1CK (C0)	2	2.7 GHz	—N/a	2 × 256 KB	3 MB	HD Graphics (10 EUs)	200–1100 MHz	35 W	LGA 1150	DMI 2.0	September 2013	CM8064601483712	
Pentium G3440T	SR1KS (C0)	2	2.8 GHz	—N/a	2 × 256 KB	3 MB	HD Graphics (10 EUs)	200–1100 MHz	35 W	LGA 1150	DMI 2.0	May 2014	CM8064601483717	
Pentium G3450T	SR1KT (C0)	2	2.9 GHz	—N/a	2 × 256 KB	3 MB	HD Graphics (10 EUs)	200–1100 MHz	35 W	LGA 1150	DMI 2.0	July 2014	CM8064601483714	
Pentium G3460T	SR1TD (C0)	2	3 GHz	—N/a	2 × 256 KB	3 MB	HD Graphics (10 EUs)	200–1100 MHz	35 W	LGA 1150	DMI 2.0	March 2015	CM8064601483760	
low power, embedded
Pentium G3320TE	SR181 (C0)	2	2.3 GHz	—N/a	2 × 256 KB	3 MB	HD Graphics (10 EUs)	350–1000 MHz	35 W	LGA 1150	DMI 2.0	September 2013	CM8064601484501	

=== Silvermont based Pentiums ===
==== "Bay Trail-D" (22 nm) ====
- All models support: MMX, SSE, SSE2, SSE3, SSSE3, SSE4.1, SSE4.2, Enhanced Intel SpeedStep Technology (EIST), Intel 64, Intel VT-x.
- GPU and memory controller are integrated onto the processor die
- GPU is based on Ivy Bridge Intel HD Graphics, with 4 execution units, and supports DirectX 11, OpenGL 4.0, OpenGL ES 3.0 and OpenCL 1.1 (on Windows). J2900 supports Intel Quick Sync Video.
- Package size: 25 mm × 27 mm

Model	sSpec number	Cores	Clock rate	Burst	L2 cache	GPU model	GPU frequency	Memory	TDP	SDP	Socket	Release date	Part number(s)	Release price (USD)
Pentium J2850	SR1LM (B2); SR1H4 (B2)	4	2.41 GHz	—N/a	2 MB	Intel Graphics Technology (4 EUs)	688-792 MHz	2 × DDR3L-1333	10 W	—N/a	FC-BGA 1170	September 2013	FH8065301455104	
Pentium J2900	SR1SB (B3); SR1US (C0)	4	2.41 GHz	2.67 GHz	2 MB	HD Graphics (4 EUs)	688-896 MHz	2 × DDR3L-1333	10 W	—N/a	FC-BGA 1170	November 2013	FH8065301614903; FH8065301614904	

=== Airmont based Pentiums ===
==== "Braswell" (14 nm) ====
- All models support: MMX, SSE, SSE2, SSE3, SSSE3, SSE4.1, SSE4.2, Enhanced Intel SpeedStep Technology (EIST), Intel 64, XD bit (an NX bit implementation), Intel VT-x, AES-NI.
- GPU and memory controller are integrated onto the processor die
- GPU is based on Broadwell Intel HD Graphics, with 18 execution units, and supports DirectX 11.2, OpenGL 4.4, OpenGL ES 3.0 and OpenCL 2.0 (on Windows).
- Package size: 25 mm × 27 mm

Model	sSpec number	Cores	Clock rate	Burst	L2 cache	GPU model	GPU frequency	Memory	TDP	SDP	Socket	Release date	Part number(s)	Release price (USD)
Pentium J3710	SR2KQ (D1)	4	1.6 GHz	2.64 GHz	2 MB	HD Graphics 405	400-740 MHz	2 × DDR3L-1600	6.5 W	—N/a	FC-BGA 1170	January 2016	FH8066501715931	

=== Skylake based Pentiums ===
==== "Skylake-S" (14 nm) ====
- All models support: MMX, SSE, SSE2, SSE3, SSSE3, SSE4.1, SSE4.2, Enhanced Intel SpeedStep Technology (EIST), Intel 64, XD bit (an NX bit implementation), Intel VT-x, Intel VT-d, AES-NI, Smart Cache.
- All models support up to DDR3-1600 or DDR4-2133 memory.
- Embedded models support ECC memory.
- Transistors: TBD
- Package size: 37.5 mm x 37.5mm

Model	sSpec number	Cores (threads)	Clock rate	Turbo	L2 cache	L3 cache	GPU model	GPU frequency	TDP	Socket	I/O bus	Release date	Part number(s)	Release price (USD)
standard power
Pentium G4400	SR2DC (R0)	2 (2)	3.3 GHz	—N/a	2 × 256 KB	3 MB	HD Graphics 510	350–1000 MHz	54 W	LGA 1151	DMI 3.0	September 2015	BX80662G4400; BXC80662G4400; CM8066201927306	
Pentium G4500	SR2HJ (S0)	2 (2)	3.5 GHz	—N/a	2 × 256 KB	3 MB	HD Graphics 530	350–1050 MHz	51 W	LGA 1151	DMI 3.0	September 2015	BX80662G4500; BXC80662G4500; CM8066201927319	
Pentium G4520	SR2HM (S0)	2 (2)	3.6 GHz	—N/a	2 × 256 KB	3 MB	HD Graphics 530	350–1050 MHz	51 W	LGA 1151	DMI 3.0	September 2015	BX80662G4520; CM8066201927407	
low power
Pentium G4400T	SR2HQ (S0)	2 (2)	2.9 GHz	—N/a	2 × 256 KB	3 MB	HD Graphics 510	350–950 MHz	35 W	LGA 1151	DMI 3.0	September 2015	CM8066201927506	
Pentium G4500T	SR2HS (S0)	2 (2)	3 GHz	—N/a	2 × 256 KB	3 MB	HD Graphics 530	350–950 MHz	35 W	LGA 1151	DMI 3.0	September 2015	CM8066201927512	
low power, embedded
Pentium G4400TE	SR2LT (R0)	2 (2)	2.4 GHz	—N/a	2 × 256 KB	3 MB	HD Graphics 510	350–950 MHz	35 W	LGA 1151	DMI 3.0	December 2015	CM8066201938702	

=== Goldmont based Pentiums ===
==== "Apollo Lake" (14 nm) ====
- All models support: MMX, SSE, SSE2, SSE3, SSSE3, SSE4.1, SSE4.2, Enhanced Intel SpeedStep Technology (EIST), Intel 64, XD bit (an NX bit implementation), Intel VT-x, AES-NI. TXT/TXE
- Package size: 24 mm × 31 mm
- DDR3L/LPDDR3/LPDDR4 dual-channel memory controller supporting up to 8 GB
- Display controller with 1 MIPI DSI port and 2 DDI ports (eDP 1.3, DP 1.1a, or HDMI 1.4b)
- Integrated Intel HD Graphics (Gen9) GPU
- PCI Express 2.0 controller supporting 6 lanes (3 dedicated and 3 multiplexed with USB 3.0); 4 lanes available externally
- Two USB 3.0 ports (1 dual role, 1 dedicated, 3 multiplexed with PCI Express 2.0 and 1 multiplexed with one SATA-300 port)
- Two USB 2.0 ports
- Two SATA-600 ports (one multiplexed with USB 3.0)
- Integrated HD audio controller
- Integrated image signal processor supporting four MIPI CSI ports and 13 MP sensors
- Integrated memory card reader supporting SDIO 3.01 and eMMC 5.0
- Serial I/O supporting SPI, HSUART (serial port) and I2C

Model	sSpec number	Cores	Clock rate	Burst	L2 cache	GPU model	GPU frequency	Memory	TDP	SDP	Socket	Release date	Part number(s)	Release price (USD)
Pentium J4205	SR2ZA (B1)	4	1.5 GHz	2.6 GHz	2 MB	HD Graphics 505	250-800 MHz	2 × DDR3L-1866; 2 × LPDDR4-2400	10 W	—N/a	FC-BGA 1296	September 2016	FH8066802986200	

=== Goldmont Plus based Pentiums ===
==== "Gemini Lake" (14 nm) ====
- All models support: MMX, SSE, SSE2, SSE3, SSSE3, SSE4.1, SSE4.2, Enhanced Intel SpeedStep Technology (EIST), Intel 64, XD bit (an NX bit implementation), Intel VT-x, Intel VT-d, AES-NI, Intel SGX.
- GPU and memory controller are integrated onto the processor die
- GPU is based on Kaby Lake Intel HD Graphics, with 18 execution units, and supports DirectX 12, OpenGL 4.5, OpenGL ES 3.0 and OpenCL 2.0 (on Windows).
- Package size: 25 mm × 24 mm

Model	sSpec number	Cores	Clock rate	Burst	L2 cache	GPU model	GPU frequency	Memory	TDP	SDP	Socket	Release date	Part number(s)	Release price (USD)
Pentium Silver J5005	SR3S3 (B0)	4	1.5 GHz	2.8 GHz	4 MB	UHD Graphics 605	250-800 MHz	2 × LPDDR4-2400	10 W	—N/a	FC-BGA 1090	December 2017	FH8068003067415	

==== "Gemini Lake Refresh" (14 nm) ====
- All models support: MMX, SSE, SSE2, SSE3, SSSE3, SSE4.1, SSE4.2, Enhanced Intel SpeedStep Technology (EIST), Intel 64, XD bit (an NX bit implementation), Intel VT-x, Intel VT-d, AES-NI, Intel SGX.
- GPU and memory controller are integrated onto the processor die
- GPU is based on Kaby Lake Intel HD Graphics, with 18 execution units, and supports DirectX 12, OpenGL 4.5, OpenGL ES 3.0 and OpenCL 2.0 (on Windows).
- Package size: 25 mm × 24 mm

50

Model	sSpec number	Cores	Clock rate	Burst	L2 cache	GPU model	GPU frequency	Memory	TDP	SDP	Socket	Release date	Part number(s)	Release price (USD)
Pentium Silver J5040	SRFDB (R0)	4	2 GHz	3.2 GHz	4 MB	UHD Graphics 605	250-800 MHz	2 × LPDDR4-2400	10 W	—N/a	FC-BGA 1090	November 2019	FH8068003067443	

=== Kaby Lake based Pentiums ===
==== "Kaby Lake-S" (14 nm) ====
- All models support: MMX, SSE, SSE2, SSE3, SSSE3, SSE4.1, SSE4.2, SGX, MPX, Enhanced Intel SpeedStep Technology (EIST), Intel 64, XD bit (an NX bit implementation), Intel VT-x, Intel VT-d, Hyper-threading, AES-NI, Smart Cache, ECC memory.
- All models support up to DDR3-1600 or DDR4-2400 memory.
- Low power models also support configurable TDP (cTDP) down.
- Transistors: TBD
- Package size: 37.5 mm x 37.5mm

Model	sSpec number	Cores (threads)	Clock rate	Turbo	L2 cache	L3 cache	GPU model	GPU frequency	TDP	Socket	I/O bus	Release date	Part number(s)	Release price (USD)
standard power
Pentium G4560	SR32Y (B0)	2 (4)	3.5 GHz	—N/a	2 × 256 KB	3 MB	HD Graphics 610	350–1050 MHz	54 W	LGA 1151	DMI 3.0	January 2017	BX80677G4560; BXC80677G4560	
Pentium G4600	SR35F (S0)	2 (4)	3.6 GHz	—N/a	2 × 256 KB	3 MB	HD Graphics 630	350–1100 MHz	51 W	LGA 1151	DMI 3.0	January 2017	BX80677G4600; BXC80677G4600	
Pentium G4620	SR35E (S0)	2 (4)	3.7 GHz	—N/a	2 × 256 KB	3 MB	HD Graphics 630	350–1100 MHz	51 W	LGA 1151	DMI 3.0	January 2017	BX80677G4620	
low power
Pentium G4560T	SR35T (S0)	2 (4)	2.9 GHz	—N/a	2 × 256 KB	3 MB	HD Graphics 610	350–1050 MHz	35 W	LGA 1151	DMI 3.0	January 2017	CM8067703016117	
Pentium G4600T	SR35R (S0)	2 (4)	3 GHz	—N/a	2 × 256 KB	3 MB	HD Graphics 630	350–1050 MHz	35 W	LGA 1151	DMI 3.0	January 2017	CM8067703016014	

=== Coffee Lake based Pentiums ===
==== "Coffee Lake-S" (14 nm) ====
- All models support: MMX, SSE, SSE2, SSE3, SSSE3, SSE4.1, SSE4.2, SGX, Enhanced Intel SpeedStep Technology (EIST), Intel 64, XD bit (an NX bit implementation), Intel VT-x, Intel VT-d, Hyper-threading, AES-NI, Smart Cache, ECC memory.
- All models support up to DDR4-2400 memory.
- Low power models also support configurable TDP (cTDP) down.
- Transistors: TBD
- Package size: 37.5 mm x 37.5mm

Model	sSpec number	Cores (threads)	Clock rate	Turbo	L2 cache	L3 cache	GPU model	GPU frequency	TDP	Socket	I/O bus	Release date	Part number(s)	Release price (USD)
Standard power
Pentium Gold G5400	SR3X9 (U0)	2 (4)	3.7 GHz	—N/a	2 × 256 KB	4 MB	UHD Graphics 610	350–1050 MHz	54 W	LGA 1151	DMI 3.0	April 2018	CM8068403360112; BX80684G5400	
Pentium Gold G5420	SR3YH (B0); SR3XA (U0)	2 (4)	3.8 GHz	—N/a	2 × 256 KB	4 MB	UHD Graphics 610	350–1050 MHz	54 W	LGA 1151	DMI 3.0	April 2019	CM8068403360113; BX80684G5420	
Pentium Gold G5500	SR3YD (B0)	2 (4)	3.8 GHz	—N/a	2 × 256 KB	4 MB	UHD Graphics 630	350–1100 MHz	54 W	LGA 1151	DMI 3.0	April 2018	CM8068403377611; BX80684G5500	
Pentium Gold G5600	SR3YB (B0)	2 (4)	3.9 GHz	—N/a	2 × 256 KB	4 MB	UHD Graphics 630	350–1100 MHz	54 W	LGA 1151	DMI 3.0	April 2018	CM8068403377513; BX80684G5600	
Pentium Gold G5620	SR3YC (B0)	2 (4)	4 GHz	—N/a	2 × 256 KB	4 MB	UHD Graphics 630	350–1100 MHz	54 W	LGA 1151	DMI 3.0	April 2019	BX80684G5620; BXC80684G5620	
Low power
Pentium Gold G5400T	SR3XB (U0)	2 (4)	3.1 GHz	—N/a	2 × 256 KB	4 MB	UHD Graphics 610	350–1050 MHz	35 W	LGA 1151	DMI 3.0	April 2018	CM8068403360212	
Pentium Gold G5420T	SR3XC (U0)	2 (4)	3.2 GHz	—N/a	2 × 256 KB	4 MB	UHD Graphics 610	350–1050 MHz	35 W	LGA 1151	DMI 3.0	April 2019	CM8068403360213	
Pentium Gold G5500T	SR3YE (B0)	2 (4)	3.2 GHz	—N/a	2 × 256 KB	4 MB	UHD Graphics 630	350–1050 MHz	35 W	LGA 1151	DMI 3.0	April 2018	CM8068403377713	
Pentium Gold G5600T	SR3YF (B0)	2 (4)	3.3 GHz	—N/a	2 × 256 KB	4 MB	UHD Graphics 630	350–1050 MHz	35 W	LGA 1151	DMI 3.0	April 2019	CM8068403377714	

==== "Coffee Lake-H" (14 nm) ====
Model	sSpec number	Cores (threads)	Clock rate	Turbo	L2 cache	L3 cache	GPU model	GPU frequency	TDP	Socket	I/O bus	Release date	Part number(s)	Release price (USD)
Embedded
Pentium Gold G5600E	SRFEF (U0)	2 (2)	2.6 GHz	3.1 GHz	2 × 256 KB	4 MB	UHD Graphics 630	350–1050 MHz	35 W	BGA 1440	DMI 3.0	June 2019	CL8068404165000	

=== Comet Lake based Pentiums ===
==== "Comet Lake-S" (14 nm) ====
- All models support: MMX, SSE, SSE2, SSE3, SSSE3, SSE4.1, SSE4.2, SGX, Enhanced Intel SpeedStep Technology (EIST), Intel 64, XD bit (an NX bit implementation), Intel VT-x, Intel VT-d, Hyper-threading, AES-NI, Smart Cache.
- All models support up to DDR4-2666 memory.
- Low power models also support configurable TDP (cTDP) down.
- Transistors: TBD
- Package size: 37.5 mm x 37.5mm

Model	sSpec number	Cores (threads)	Clock rate	Turbo	L2 cache	L3 cache	GPU model	GPU frequency	TDP	Socket	I/O bus	Release date	Part number(s)	Release price (USD)
Standard power
Pentium Gold G6400	SRH3Y (G1)	2 (4)	4 GHz	—N/a	2 × 256 KB	4 MB	UHD Graphics 610	350–1050 MHz	58 W	LGA 1200	DMI 3.0	April 2020	CM8070104291810; BX80701G6400; BXC80701G6400	
Pentium Gold G6405	SRH3Z (G1)	2 (4)	4.1 GHz	—N/a	2 × 256 KB	4 MB	UHD Graphics 610	350–1050 MHz	58 W	LGA 1200	DMI 3.0	March 2021	CM8070104291811; BX80701G6405	
Pentium Gold G6500	SRH3U (G1)	2 (4)	4.1 GHz	—N/a	2 × 256 KB	4 MB	UHD Graphics 630	350–1100 MHz	58 W	LGA 1200	DMI 3.0	April 2020	CM8070104291610; BX80701G6500; BXC80701G6500	
Pentium Gold G6505	SRH3V (G1)	2 (4)	4.2 GHz	—N/a	2 × 256 KB	4 MB	UHD Graphics 630	350–1100 MHz	58 W	LGA 1200	DMI 3.0	March 2021	CM8070104291611	
Pentium Gold G6600	SRH3S (G1)	2 (4)	4.2 GHz	—N/a	2 × 256 KB	4 MB	UHD Graphics 630	350–1100 MHz	58 W	LGA 1200	DMI 3.0	April 2020	CM8070104291510; BX80701G6600; BXC80701G6600	
Pentium Gold G6605	SRH3T (G1)	2 (4)	4.3 GHz	—N/a	2 × 256 KB	4 MB	UHD Graphics 630	350–1100 MHz	58 W	LGA 1200	DMI 3.0	March 2021	CM8070104291511; BX80701G6605	
Standard power, embedded
Pentium Gold G6400E	SRH6G (G1)	2 (4)	3.8 GHz	—N/a	2 × 256 KB	4 MB	UHD Graphics 610	350–1050 MHz	58 W	LGA 1200	DMI 3.0	April 2020	CM8070104423809	
Low power
Pentium Gold G6400T	SRH40 (G1)	2 (4)	3.4 GHz	—N/a	2 × 256 KB	4 MB	UHD Graphics 610	350–1050 MHz	35 W	LGA 1200	DMI 3.0	April 2020	CM8070104291907	
Pentium Gold G6405T	SRH41 (G1)	2 (4)	3.5 GHz	—N/a	2 × 256 KB	4 MB	UHD Graphics 610	350–1050 MHz	35 W	LGA 1200	DMI 3.0	March 2021	CM8070104291909	
Pentium Gold G6500T	SRH3W (G1)	2 (4)	3.5 GHz	—N/a	2 × 256 KB	4 MB	UHD Graphics 630	350–1050 MHz	35 W	LGA 1200	DMI 3.0	April 2020	CM8070104291707	
Pentium Gold G6505T	SRH3X (G1)	2 (4)	3.6 GHz	—N/a	2 × 256 KB	4 MB	UHD Graphics 630	350–1050 MHz	35 W	LGA 1200	DMI 3.0	March 2021	CM8070104291709	
Low power, embedded
Pentium Gold G6400TE	SRH6H (G1)	2 (4)	3.2 GHz	—N/a	2 × 256 KB	4 MB	UHD Graphics 610	350–1050 MHz	35 W	LGA 1200	DMI 3.0	April 2020	CM8070104423912	

=== Golden Cove based Pentiums ===
==== "Alder Lake" (Intel 7) ====
- All models support: SSE4.1, SSE4.2, AVX, AVX2, FMA3, Enhanced Intel SpeedStep Technology (EIST), Intel 64, XD bit (an NX bit implementation), Intel VT-x, Intel VT-d, Hyper-threading, AES-NI, Smart Cache, DL Boost, GNA 3.0, and Optane memory.
- All models support up to DDR5-4800 or DDR4-3200 memory, and 16 lanes of PCI Express 5.0 + 4 lanes of PCIe 4.0.

Model number	Cores (threads)	Freq.	Turbo	L2 cache	L3 cache	GPU model	GPU frequency	Power		Socket	I/O bus	Release date	sSpec number	Part number(s)
Model number	Cores (threads)	Freq.	Turbo	L2 cache	L3 cache	GPU model	GPU frequency	Base	Max Turbo	Socket	I/O bus	Release date	sSpec number	Part number(s)
Standard power
Pentium Gold G7400	2 (4)	3.7 GHz	—N/a	2 × 1.25 MB	6 MB	UHD 710	300–1350 MHz	46 W	—N/a	LGA 1700	DMI 4.0 ×8	January 2022	SRL66 (H0)	CM8071504651605; BX80715G7400
Standard power, embedded
Pentium Gold G7400E	2 (4)	3.6 GHz	—N/a	2 × 1.25 MB	6 MB	UHD 710	300–1350 MHz	46 W	—N/a	LGA 1700	DMI 4.0 ×8	January 2022	SRL6R (H0)	CM8071504653907
Low power
Pentium Gold G7400T	2 (4)	3.1 GHz	—N/a	2 × 1.25 MB	6 MB	UHD 710	300–1350 MHz	35 W	—N/a	LGA 1700	DMI 4.0 ×8	January 2022	SRL65 (H0)	CM8071504651504
Low power, embedded
Pentium Gold G7400TE	2 (4)	3.0 GHz	—N/a	2 × 1.25 MB	6 MB	UHD 710	300–1350 MHz	35 W	—N/a	LGA 1700	DMI 4.0 ×8	January 2022	SRL6S (H0)	CM8071504654005

== Mobile processors ==
=== P5 based Pentiums ===
==== "P54C" (600 nm) ====
- Based on P5 microarchitecture

Model	Clock rate	L1 cache	FSB	Mult.	Voltage	TDP	Socket	Release date	Part number(s)	sSpec number
Mobile Pentium 75	75 MHz	8 + 8 KB	50 MT/s	1.5×	3.3 V	6/4.4 W	Socket 7; TCP320		A8050275; TT8050275; TT80502-75	SK091 (mA1), SK122 (mA4), SK079 (C2), SK089 (mA1), SK119 (mA4), SX951 (B3), SX975 (B5), SY009 (E0), SY056 (mcC0)
Mobile Pentium 90	90 MHz	8 + 8 KB	60 MT/s	1.5×	3.3 V	7.3 W	Socket 7; TCP320		A8050290; TT8050290	SK092 (mA1), SK123 (mA4), SK090 (mA1), SK120 (mA4)
Mobile Pentium 100	100 MHz	8 + 8 KB	66 MT/s	1.5×	3.3 V	8/5.9 W	Socket 7; TCP320		A80502100; TT80502100	SK124 (mA4), SY046 (mcC0), SK121 (mA4), SY020 (mcC0), SY029 (mcB1)

==== "P54LM" (350 nm) ====
- Based on P5 microarchitecture

Model	Clock rate	L1 cache	FSB	Mult.	Voltage	TDP	Socket	Release date	Part number(s)	sSpec number
Mobile Pentium 120	120 MHz	8 + 8 KB	60 MT/s	2×	Core=2.9 I/O=3.3 V	7.1 (Max.10.87) W	Socket 7; TCP320		A80502120; TT80502120	SX999 (mcB1), SY027 (mcC0), SY030 (mcC0), SK113 (mcB1), SK118 (mcB1), SY021 (mcC0)
Mobile Pentium 133	133 MHz	8 + 8 KB	66 MT/s	2×	Core=2.9 (3.1 SY028) I/O=3.3 V	7.9 (Max.11.7 SY019 12.25 SY028 ) W	Socket 7; TCP320		A80502133; TT80502133	SY028 (mcC0)This processor was also offered as an embedded microprocessor with Voltage Reduction Technology, SY019 (mcC0)
Mobile Pentium 150	150 MHz	8 + 8 KB	60 MT/s	2.5×	Core=3.1 I/O=3.3 V	10 (Max.14.0) W	Socket 7; TCP320		A80502150; TT80502150	SY058 (mcC0), SY043 (mcC0), SY061 (mcC0)

==== "P55LM" (350 nm) ====
- Based on P5 microarchitecture

Model	Clock rate	L1 cache	FSB	Mult.	Voltage	TDP	Socket	Release date	Part number(s)	sSpec number
Mobile Pentium MMX 120	120 MHz	16 + 16 KB	60 MT/s	2×	2.2 V	4.2 W	TCP320	October 20, 1997	TT80503120	SL2JS (mxB1)
Mobile Pentium MMX 133	133 MHz	16 + 16 KB	66 MT/s	2×	3.135–3.465 V	7.8 W	Socket 7; TCP320	May 19, 1997	FV80503133; TT80503133	SL27C (mxB1), SL26W, SL27D (mxB1), SL27E
Mobile Pentium MMX 150	150 MHz	16 + 16 KB	60 MT/s	2.5×	3.135–3.6 V	8.6 W	Socket 7; TCP320	January 8, 1997	FV80503150; TT80503150	SL246 (mxA3), SL27B (mxB1), SL22G (mxA3), SL26S, SL26U (mxB1)
Mobile Pentium MMX 166	167 MHz	16 + 16 KB	66 MT/s	2.5×	3.135–3.6 V	9 W	Socket 7; TCP320	January 8, 1997	FV80503166; TT80503166	SL23Z (mxA3), SL27A (mxB1), SL22F (mxA3), SL26R, SL26T (mxB1)

==== "Tillamook" (250 nm) ====
- Based on P5 microarchitecture

Model	Clock rate	L1 cache	FSB	Mult.	Voltage	TDP	Socket	Release date	Part number(s)	sSpec number
Mobile Pentium MMX 166	167 MHz	16 + 16 KB	66 MT/s	2.5×	Core=1.8 I/O=2.5 V	2.9 (Max.4.1~5.4) W	TCP320	January 12, 1998	TT80503166	SL2N6 (myA0)
Mobile Pentium MMX 200	200 MHz	16 + 16 KB	66 MT/s	3×	Core=1.8 I/O=2.5 V	3.4 (Max.5.0~6.1) W	Socket 7; TCP320	September 8, 1997	FV80503200; TT80503200	SL2WK (mxB1), SL28P (myA0)
Mobile Pentium MMX 233	233 MHz	16 + 16 KB	66 MT/s	3.5×	Core=1.8 I/O=2.5 V	3.9 (Max.5.5~7.0) W	Socket 7; TCP320	September 8, 1997	FV80503233; TT80503233	SL2Z3, SL28Q (myA0)
Mobile Pentium MMX 266	267 MHz	16 + 16 KB	66 MT/s	4×	Core=2.0 I/O=2.5 V	5.3 (Max.7,6~9.6) W	TCP320	January 12, 1998	TT80503266	SL23M (myB2), SL23P (myB2), SL2N5 (myA0), SL2ZH (myA0)
Mobile Pentium MMX 300	300 MHz	16 + 16 KB	66 MT/s	4.5×	Core=2.0 I/O=2.5 V	8.0 W	TCP320	January 7, 1999	TT80503300	SL34N (myB2)
Embedded Pentium MMX 166	167 MHz	16 + 16 KB	66 MT/s	2.5×	Core=1.9 I/O=2.5 V	4.1 (Max.6.1) W	Socket 7; HL-PBGA352	October 13, 1998	FV80503166; GC80503CSM	SL2ZX (myA0), SL388 (myA0), SL3B8
Embedded Pentium MMX 266	267 MHz	16 + 16 KB	66 MT/s	4×	Core=1.9 I/O=2.5 V	7.6 (Max.9.16) W	Socket 7; HL-PBGA352	October 13, 1998	FV80503266; GC80503CSM	SL2Z4 (myA0), SL389 (myA0)

=== P6 based Pentiums ===
Mobile processors based on the P6 microarchitecture were marketed as Pentium II, Pentium III, Pentium M and Pentium Dual-Core, as well as variations of these names.

=== NetBurst based Pentiums ===
Mobile processors based on the NetBurst microarchitecture were marketed as Pentium 4.

=== Core based Pentiums ===
Prior mobile processors based on the Core microarchitecture were marketed as Pentium Dual-Core, while the latest models were named Pentium. Note however, that several resellers will still refer to them as Pentium Dual-Core.

==== "Yonah" (65 nm) ====
- Based on the 32-bit Enhanced Pentium M microarchitecture
- All models support: MMX, SSE, SSE2, SSE3, Enhanced Intel SpeedStep Technology (EIST), XD bit (an NX bit implementation)
- Die size: 90.3 mm²
- Steppings: D0
- T2060 debuted on January 30, 2007 in notebooks only sold as part of Windows Vista launch bundles; it appears to be OEM-only.
- T2060 & T2080 were discovered to be an Intel Core T2050 & T2250 with half the L2 cache (old versions of CPU-Z identified them as T2050 & T2250)

Model	Clock rate	L2 cache	FSB	Mult.	Voltage	TDP	Socket	Release date	Release price (USD)
Pentium Dual-Core T2060	1.6 GHz	1 MB	533 MT/s	12×	0.762–1.3 V	31 W	Socket M	January 2007	
Pentium Dual-Core T2080	1.73 GHz	1 MB	533 MT/s	13×	0.762–1.3 V	31 W	Socket M	April 2007	
Pentium Dual-Core T2130	1.87 GHz	1 MB	533 MT/s	14×	0.762–1.3 V	31 W	Socket M	Middle 2007	
Pentium Dual-Core T2350	1.87 GHz	2 MB	533 MT/s	14×	0.762–1.3 V	31 W	Socket M	Middle 2007	

==== "Merom-M", "Merom-2M" (65 nm) ====
- Based on the 64-bit Core microarchitecture
- All models support: MMX, SSE, SSE2, SSE3, SSSE3, Enhanced Intel SpeedStep Technology (EIST), Intel 64, XD bit (an NX bit implementation)
- Die size: 111 mm²
- Steppings: M0

Model	sSpec number	Cores	Clock rate	L2 cache	FSB	Mult.	Voltage	TDP	Socket	Release date	Part number(s)	Release price (USD)
Pentium Dual-Core T2310	SLAEC (M0)	2	1.47 GHz	1 MB	533 MT/s	11×	1.075–1.175 V	35 W	Socket P	Q4 2007	LF80537GE0201M	
Pentium Dual-Core T2330	SLA4K (M0)	2	1.6 GHz	1 MB	533 MT/s	12×	1.075–1.175 V	35 W	Socket P	Q4 2007	LF80537GE0251MN	
Pentium Dual-Core T2370	SLA4J (M0)	2	1.73 GHz	1 MB	533 MT/s	13×	1.075–1.175 V	35 W	Socket P	Q4 2007	LF80537GE0301M	
Pentium Dual-Core T2390	SLA4H (M0)	2	1.87 GHz	1 MB	533 MT/s	14×	1.075–1.175 V	35 W	Socket P	Q2 2008	LF80537GE0361M	
Pentium Dual-Core T2410	SLA4G (M0)	2	2 GHz	1 MB	533 MT/s	15×	1.075–1.175 V	35 W	Socket P	Q3 2008	LF80537GE0411M	
Pentium Dual-Core T3200	SLAVG (M0)	2	2 GHz	1 MB	667 MT/s	12×	1.075–1.175 V	35 W	Socket P	Q4 2008	LF80537GF0411M	
Pentium Dual-Core T3400	SLB3P (M0)	2	2.17 GHz	1 MB	667 MT/s	13×	1.075–1.175 V	35 W	Socket P	Q4 2008	LF80537GF0481M	

==== "Penryn-3M", "Penryn-L" (45 nm) ====
- Based on the 64-bit Penryn microarchitecture
- All models support: MMX, SSE, SSE2, SSE3, SSSE3, Enhanced Intel SpeedStep Technology (EIST), Intel 64, XD bit (an NX bit implementation)
- Die size: 82 mm²
- Steppings: R0

Model	sSpec number	Cores	Clock rate	L2 cache	FSB	Mult.	Voltage	TDP	Socket	Release date	Part number(s)	Release price (USD)
Dual Core, standard power
Pentium T4200	SLGJN (R0)	2	2 GHz	1 MB	800 MT/s	10×	1.05–1.15 V	35 W	Socket P	January 2009	AW80577GG0411MA	
Pentium T4300	SLGJM (R0)	2	2.1 GHz	1 MB	800 MT/s	10.5×	1.05–1.15 V	35 W	Socket P	April 2009	AW80577GG0451MA	
Pentium T4400	SLGJL (R0)	2	2.2 GHz	1 MB	800 MT/s	11×	1.05–1.15 V	35 W	Socket P	December 2009	AW80577GG0491MA	
Pentium T4500	SLGZC (R0)	2	2.3 GHz	1 MB	800 MT/s	11.5×	1.05–1.15 V	35 W	Socket P	January 2010	AW80577GG0521MA	
Single Core, ultra-low power
Pentium SU2700	SLGS8 (R0)	2	1.3 GHz	2 MB	800 MT/s	6.5×	1.05–1.15 V	10 W	μFC-BGA 956	May 23, 2009	AV80585UG0132M	
Dual Core, ultra-low power
Pentium SU4100	SLGS4 (R0)	2	1.3 GHz	2 MB	800 MT/s	6.5×	1.05–1.15 V	10 W	μFC-BGA 956	September 2009	AV80577UG0132M	

Note: The Pentium SU2X00 series processors have a single core, not two, according to Intel's website.

=== Westmere based Pentiums ===
==== "Arrandale" (MCP, 32 nm) ====
- Like the Penryn series of notebook Pentium processors, the P6000 and U5000 series are dual core, but under the Pentium brand.
- Based on Westmere microarchitecture
- All models support: MMX, SSE, SSE2, SSE3, SSSE3, Enhanced Intel SpeedStep Technology (EIST), Intel 64, XD bit (an NX bit implementation), Smart Cache
- FSB has been replaced with DMI.
- Contains 45 nm "Ironlake" GPU HD Graphics.
- Die size: 81 mm²
- Transistors: 382 million
- Graphics and Integrated Memory Controller die size: 114 mm²
- Transistors: 177 million
- Stepping: C2, K0

Model	sSpec number	Clock rate	Turbo	GPU frequency	Cores	L2 cache	L3 cache	I/O bus	Mult.	Memory	Voltage	TDP	Socket	Release date	Part number(s)	Release price (USD)
standard power
Pentium P6000	SLBWB (C2)	1.87 GHz	—N/a	500–667 MHz	2	2 × 256 KB	3 MB	DMI	14×	2 × DDR3-1066	0.775–1.4 V	35 W	Socket G1	June 20, 2010	CP80617004170AF	
Pentium P6100	SLBUR (K0)	2 GHz	—N/a	500–667 MHz	2	2 × 256 KB	3 MB	DMI	15×	2 × DDR3-1066	0.775–1.4 V	35 W	Socket G1	September 26, 2010	CP80617004125AL	
Pentium P6200	SLBUA (K0)	2.13 GHz	—N/a	500–667 MHz	2	2 × 256 KB	3 MB	DMI	16×	2 × DDR3-1066	0.775–1.4 V	35 W	Socket G1	September 26, 2010	CP80617004122AW	
Pentium P6300	SLBU8 (K0)	2.27 GHz	—N/a	500–667 MHz	2	2 × 256 KB	3 MB	DMI	17×	2 × DDR3-1066	0.775–1.4 V	35 W	Socket G1	January 9, 2011	CP80617004161AK	
ultra-low power
Pentium U5400	SLBUH (K0)	1.2 GHz	—N/a	166–500 MHz	2	2 × 256 KB	3 MB	DMI	9×	2 × DDR3-800	0.725–1.4 V	18 W	BGA-1288	May 25, 2010	CN80617006042AC	
Pentium U5600	SLBSM (K0)	1.33 GHz	—N/a	166–500 MHz	2	2 × 256 KB	3 MB	DMI	10×	2 × DDR3-800	0.725–1.4 V	18 W	BGA-1288	January 9, 2011	CN80617005190AG	

=== Sandy Bridge based Pentiums ===
==== "Sandy Bridge" (32 nm) ====
- All models support: MMX, SSE, SSE2, SSE3, SSSE3, SSE4.1, SSE4.2, Enhanced Intel SpeedStep Technology (EIST), Intel 64, XD bit (an NX bit implementation), Smart Cache.
- HD Graphics (Sandy Bridge) contain 6 EUs as well as HD Graphics 2000, but does not support the following technologies: Intel Quick Sync Video, InTru 3D, Clear Video HD, Wireless Display, Intel Insider.
- Transistors: 504 million
- Die size: 131 mm²

Model	sSpec number	Cores	Clock rate	Turbo	L2 cache	L3 cache	GPU model	GPU frequency	TDP	Socket	I/O bus	Release date	Part number(s)	Release price (USD)
standard power
Pentium B940	SR07S (Q0)	2	2 GHz	—N/a	2 × 256 KB	2 MB	Intel Graphics Technology (6 EUs)	650–1100 MHz	35 W	Socket G2	DMI 2.0	June 19, 2011	FF8062700847801	
Pentium B950	SR07T (Q0)	2	2.1 GHz	—N/a	2 × 256 KB	2 MB	HD Graphics (6 EUs)	650–1100 MHz	35 W	Socket G2	DMI 2.0	June 19, 2011	FF8062700847901	
Pentium B960	SR0C9 (D2); SR07V (Q0)	2	2.2 GHz	—N/a	2 × 256 KB	2 MB	HD Graphics (6 EUs)	650–1100 MHz	35 W	Socket G2	DMI 2.0	October 2, 2011	FF8062701123900; FF8062700997701	
Pentium B970	SR0J2 (Q0)	2	2.3 GHz	—N/a	2 × 256 KB	2 MB	HD Graphics (6 EUs)	650–1100 MHz	35 W	Socket G2	DMI 2.0	January 2012	FF8062700998002	
Pentium B980	SR0J1 (Q0)	2	2.4 GHz	—N/a	2 × 256 KB	2 MB	HD Graphics (6 EUs)	650–1150 MHz	35 W	Socket G2	DMI 2.0	September 2012	FF8062700997802	
ultra-low power
Pentium 957	SR089 (Q0)	2	1.2 GHz	—N/a	2 × 256 KB	2 MB	HD Graphics (6 EUs)	350–800 MHz	17 W	BGA-1023	DMI 2.0	June 19, 2011	AV8062700852600	
Pentium 967	SR0EX (Q0); SR0FC (J1)	2	1.3 GHz	—N/a	2 × 256 KB	2 MB	HD Graphics (6 EUs)	350–1000 MHz	17 W	BGA-1023	DMI 2.0	October 2, 2011	AV8062701022501; AV8062701147801	
Pentium 977	SR0EY (J1); SR0FB (J1); SR0V1 (Q0)	2	1.4 GHz	—N/a	2 × 256 KB	2 MB	HD Graphics (6 EUs)	350–1000 MHz	17 W	BGA-1023	DMI 2.0	January 2012	AV8062701022601; AV8062701147701; AV8062701022601	
Pentium 987	SR08E (Q0); SR0F1 (Q0); SR0FA (J1); SR0V4 (Q0)	2	1.5 GHz	—N/a	2 × 256 KB	2 MB	HD Graphics (6 EUs)	350–1000 MHz	17 W	BGA-1023	DMI 2.0	Q3 2012	AV8062701084700; AV8062701084701; AV8062701147601; AV8062701084701	
Pentium 997	SR08F (Q0); SR0F2 (Q0); SR0F9 (J1); SR0V5 (Q0)	2	1.6 GHz	—N/a	2 × 256 KB	2 MB	HD Graphics (6 EUs)	350–1000 MHz	17 W	BGA-1023	DMI 2.0	September 2012	AV8062701084800; AV8062701084801; AV8062701147501; AV8062701084801	

=== Ivy Bridge based Pentiums ===
==== "Ivy Bridge" (22 nm) ====
- All models support: MMX, SSE, SSE2, SSE3, SSSE3, SSE4.1, SSE4.2, Enhanced Intel SpeedStep Technology (EIST), Intel 64, XD bit (an NX bit implementation), Intel VT-x, Smart Cache.
- HD Graphics (Ivy Bridge) contain 6 EUs as well as HD Graphics 2500, but does not support the following technologies: Intel Quick Sync Video, InTru 3D, Clear Video HD, Wireless Display, Intel Insider.
- Transistors: 1.4 billion
- Die size: 160 mm²

Model	sSpec number	Cores	Clock rate	Turbo	L2 cache	L3 cache	GPU model	GPU frequency	TDP	Socket	I/O bus	Release date	Part number(s)	Release price (USD)
standard power
Pentium A1018	SR1C5 (P0); SR1V6 (P0)	2	2.1 GHz	—N/a	2 × 256 KB	1 MB	Intel Graphics Technology (6 EUs)	650-1000 MHz	35 W	Socket G2	DMI 2.0	June 2013	AW8063801567000	
Pentium 2020M	SR0U1 (L1); SR184 (E1)	2	2.4 GHz	—N/a	2 × 256 KB	2 MB	HD Graphics (6 EUs)	650-1100 MHz	35 W	Socket G2	DMI 2.0	September 2012	AW8063801211202; AW8063801539300	
Pentium 2030M	SR0ZZ (P0)	2	2.5 GHz	—N/a	2 × 256 KB	2 MB	HD Graphics (6 EUs)	650-1100 MHz	35 W	Socket G2	DMI 2.0	January 2013	AW8063801120500	
low power
Pentium 2117U	SR0VQ (P0)	2	1.8 GHz	—N/a	2 × 256 KB	2 MB	HD Graphics (6 EUs)	350-1000 MHz	17 W	BGA-1023	DMI 2.0	September 2012	AV8063801058800	
Pentium 2127U	SR105 (P0)	2	1.9 GHz	—N/a	2 × 256 KB	2 MB	HD Graphics (6 EUs)	350-1000 MHz	17 W	BGA-1023	DMI 2.0	June 2013	AV8063801119100	
ultra-low power
Pentium 2129Y	SR12M (P0)	2	1.1 GHz	—N/a	2 × 256 KB	2 MB	HD Graphics (6 EUs)	350-850 MHz	10 W	BGA-1023	DMI 2.0	January 2013	AV8063801377901	

=== Haswell based Pentiums ===
==== "Haswell-MB" (22 nm) ====
- All models support: MMX, SSE, SSE2, SSE3, SSSE3, SSE4.1, SSE4.2, Enhanced Intel SpeedStep Technology (EIST), Intel 64, XD bit (an NX bit implementation), Intel VT-x, Smart Cache.
- Transistors: 1.3 billion
- Die size: 181 mm²

Model	sSpec number	Cores	Clock rate	Turbo	L2 cache	L3 cache	GPU model	GPU frequency	TDP	Socket	I/O bus	Release date	Part number(s)	Release price (USD)
Pentium 3550M	SR1HD (C0)	2	2.3 GHz	—N/a	2 × 256 KB	2 MB	Intel Graphics Technology (10 EUs)	400–1100 MHz	37 W	Socket G3	DMI 2.0	September 2013	CW8064701486907	
Pentium 3560M	SR1LC (C0)	2	2.4 GHz	—N/a	2 × 256 KB	2 MB	HD Graphics (10 EUs)	400–1100 MHz	37 W	Socket G3	DMI 2.0	April 2014	CW8064701486906	

==== "Haswell-ULT" (SiP, 22 nm) ====
- All models support: MMX, SSE, SSE2, SSE3, SSSE3, SSE4.1, SSE4.2, Enhanced Intel SpeedStep Technology (EIST), Intel 64, XD bit (an NX bit implementation), Intel VT-x, Smart Cache.
- 3558U also supports Intel Wireless Display.
- Transistors: 1.3 billion
- Die size: 181 mm²

Model	sSpec number	Cores	Clock rate	Turbo	L2 cache	L3 cache	GPU model	GPU frequency	TDP	Socket	I/O bus	Release date	Part number(s)	Release price (USD)
Pentium 3556U	SR1E3 (D0)	2	1.7 GHz	—N/a	2 × 256 KB	2 MB	Intel Graphics Technology (10 EUs)	200–1000 MHz	15 W	BGA-1168	DMI 2.0	September 2013	CL8064701558100	
Pentium 3558U	SR1E8 (D0)	2	1.7 GHz	—N/a	2 × 256 KB	2 MB	HD Graphics (10 EUs)	200–1000 MHz	15 W	BGA-1168	DMI 2.0	December 2013	CL8064701569500	

==== "Haswell-ULX" (SiP, 22 nm) ====
- All models support: MMX, SSE, SSE2, SSE3, SSSE3, SSE4.1, SSE4.2, Enhanced Intel SpeedStep Technology (EIST), Intel 64, XD bit (an NX bit implementation), Intel VT-x, Smart Cache.
- 3561Y also supports Intel Wireless Display.
- Transistors: 1.3 billion
- Die size: 181 mm²

Model	sSpec number	Cores	Clock rate	Turbo	L2 cache	L3 cache	GPU model	GPU frequency	TDP	Socket	I/O bus	Release date	Part number(s)	Release price (USD)
Pentium 3560Y	SR1DE (D0)	2	1.2 GHz	—N/a	2 × 256 KB	2 MB	Intel Graphics Technology (10 EUs)	200–850 MHz	11.5 W	BGA-1168	DMI 2.0	September 2013	CL8064701486008	
Pentium 3561Y	SR1DG (D0)	2	1.2 GHz	—N/a	2 × 256 KB	2 MB	HD Graphics (10 EUs)	200–850 MHz	11.5 W	BGA-1168	DMI 2.0	December 2013	CL8064701568201	

==== "Broadwell-U" (14 nm) ====
- All models support: MMX, SSE, SSE2, SSE3, SSSE3, SSE4.1, SSE4.2, Enhanced Intel SpeedStep Technology (EIST), Intel 64, XD bit (an NX bit implementation), Intel VT-x, Intel VT-d, Smart Cache, Intel Wireless Display, and configurable TDP (cTDP) down
- 3825U also supports Hyper-threading.
- Transistors: 1.3 billion
- Die size: 82 mm²

Model	sSpec number	Cores	Clock rate	Turbo	L2 cache	L3 cache	GPU model	GPU frequency	TDP	Socket	I/O bus	Release date	Part number(s)	Release price (USD)
Pentium 3805U	SR210 (E0)	2	1.9 GHz	—N/a	2 × 256 KB	2 MB	HD Graphics (12 EUs)	100–800 MHz	15 W	BGA-1168	DMI 2.0	January 2015	FH8065801620702	
Pentium 3825U	SR24B (F0)	2	1.9 GHz	—N/a	2 × 256 KB	2 MB	HD Graphics (12 EUs)	300–850 MHz	15 W	BGA-1168	DMI 2.0	March 2015	FH8065801620705	

=== Silvermont based Pentiums ===
==== "Bay Trail-M" (22 nm) ====
- All models support: MMX, SSE, SSE2, SSE3, SSSE3, SSE4.1, SSE4.2, Enhanced Intel SpeedStep Technology (EIST), Intel 64, XD bit (an NX bit implementation), Intel VT-x.
- GPU and memory controller are integrated onto the processor die
- GPU is based on Ivy Bridge Intel HD Graphics, with 4 execution units, and supports DirectX 11, OpenGL 4.0, OpenGL ES 3.0 and OpenCL 1.1 (on Windows). N3530 and N3540 support Intel Quick Sync Video.
- Package size: 25 mm × 27 mm
- Transistors: 960 million
- Die size: 130 mm²

Model	sSpec number	Cores	Clock rate	Burst	L2 cache	GPU model	GPU frequency	Memory	TDP	SDP	Socket	Release date	Part number(s)	Release price (USD)
Pentium N3510	SR1LV (B2); SR1HP (B2)	4	2 GHz	—N/a	2 MB	Intel Graphics Technology (4 EUs)	313-750 MHz	2 × DDR3L-1333	7.5 W	4.5 W	FC-BGA 1170	September 2013	FH8065301546301	
Pentium N3520	SR1SE (B3)	4	2.16 GHz	2.42 GHz	2 MB	HD Graphics (4 EUs)	313-854 MHz	2 × DDR3L-1333	7.5 W	4.5 W	FC-BGA 1170	November 2013	FH8065301616103	
Pentium N3530	SR1W2 (C0)	4	2.16 GHz	2.58 GHz	2 MB	HD Graphics (4 EUs)	313-896 MHz	2 × DDR3L-1333	7.5 W	4.5 W	FC-BGA 1170	February 2014	FH8065301728501	
Pentium N3540	SR1YW (C0)	4	2.16 GHz	2.66 GHz	2 MB	HD Graphics (4 EUs)	313-896 MHz	2 × DDR3L-1333	7.5 W	4.5 W	FC-BGA 1170	July 2014	FH8065301919700	

=== Airmont based Pentiums ===
==== "Braswell" (14 nm) ====
- All models support: MMX, SSE, SSE2, SSE3, SSSE3, SSE4.1, SSE4.2, Enhanced Intel SpeedStep Technology (EIST), Intel 64, XD bit (an NX bit implementation), Intel VT-x, AES-NI.
- GPU and memory controller are integrated onto the processor die
- GPU is based on Broadwell Intel HD Graphics, with 16 execution units, and supports DirectX 11.2, OpenGL 4.3, OpenGL ES 3.0 and OpenCL 1.2 (on Windows).
- Package size: 25 mm × 27 mm

Model	sSpec number	Cores	Clock rate	Burst	L2 cache	GPU model	GPU frequency	Memory	TDP	SDP	Socket	Release date	Part number(s)	Release price (USD)
Pentium N3700	SR29E (C0); SR2A7 (C0)	4	1.6 GHz	2.4 GHz	2 MB	Intel Graphics Technology (16 EUs)	400-700 MHz	2 × DDR3L-1600	6 W	4 W	FC-BGA 1170	March 2015	FH8066501715906; FH8066501715923	
Pentium N3710	SR2KL (D1)	4	1.6 GHz	2.56 GHz	2 MB	HD Graphics 405	400-700 MHz	2 × DDR3L-1600	6 W	4 W	FC-BGA 1170	January 2016	FH8066501715927	

=== Skylake based Pentiums ===
==== "Skylake-U" (14 nm) ====
- All models support: MMX, SSE, SSE2, SSE3, SSSE3, SSE4.1, SSE4.2, Hyper-threading, Enhanced Intel SpeedStep Technology (EIST), Intel 64, XD bit (an NX bit implementation), Intel VT-x, Intel VT-d, AES-NI, Smart Cache, Intel Wireless Display, and configurable TDP (cTDP) down
- GPU supports DirectX 12, OpenGL 4.4 and Intel Quick Sync Video.

Model	sSpec number	Cores (threads)	Clock rate	Turbo	L2 cache	L3 cache	GPU model	GPU frequency	TDP	Socket	I/O bus	Release date	Part number(s)	Release price (USD)
Pentium 4405U	SR2EX (D1)	2 (4)	2.1 GHz	—N/a	2 × 256 KB	2 MB	HD Graphics 510	300–950 MHz	15 W	BGA 1356	DMI 3.0	September 2015	FJ8066201930905	

==== "Skylake-Y" (14 nm) ====
- All models support: MMX, SSE, SSE2, SSE3, SSSE3, SSE4.1, SSE4.2, Hyper-threading, Enhanced Intel SpeedStep Technology (EIST), Intel 64, XD bit (an NX bit implementation), Intel VT-x, Intel VT-d, AES-NI, Smart Cache, Intel Wireless Display, and configurable TDP (cTDP) down
- GPU supports DirectX 12, OpenGL 4.4 and Intel Quick Sync Video.

Model	sSpec number	Cores (threads)	Clock rate	Turbo	L2 cache	L3 cache	GPU model	GPU frequency	TDP	Socket	I/O bus	Release date	Part number(s)	Release price (USD)
Pentium 4405Y	SR2ER (D1)	2 (4)	1.5 GHz	—N/a	2 × 256 KB	2 MB	HD Graphics 515	300–800 MHz	6 W	BGA 1515	DMI 3.0	September 2015	HE8066201931229	

=== Goldmont based Pentiums ===
==== "Apollo Lake" (14 nm) ====
- All models support: MMX, SSE, SSE2, SSE3, SSSE3, SSE4.1, SSE4.2, Enhanced Intel SpeedStep Technology (EIST), Intel 64, XD bit (an NX bit implementation), Intel VT-x, Intel VT-d, AES-NI.
- GPU and memory controller are integrated onto the processor die
- GPU is based on Skylake Intel HD Graphics, with 18 execution units, and supports DirectX 12, OpenGL 4.5, OpenGL ES 3.0, OpenCL 1.2 (on Windows) and Intel Quick Sync Video.
- Package size: 24 mm × 31 mm

Model	sSpec number	Cores	Clock rate	Burst	L2 cache	GPU model	GPU frequency	Memory	TDP	SDP	Socket	Release date	Part number(s)	Release price (USD)
Pentium N4200	SR2Y9 (B0); SR2Z5 (B1); SR36K; SRGVZ (F1)	4	1.1 GHz	2.5 GHz	2 MB	HD Graphics 505	200-750 MHz	2 × DDR3L-1866; 2 × LPDDR4-2400	6 W	4 W	FC-BGA 1296	September 2016	FH8066802979703	

=== Goldmont Plus based Pentiums ===
==== "Gemini Lake" (14 nm) ====
- All models support: MMX, SSE, SSE2, SSE3, SSSE3, SSE4.1, SSE4.2, Enhanced Intel SpeedStep Technology (EIST), Intel 64, XD bit (an NX bit implementation), Intel VT-x, Intel VT-d, AES-NI, Intel SGX.
- GPU and memory controller are integrated onto the processor die
- GPU is based on Kaby Lake Intel HD Graphics, with 18 execution units, and supports DirectX 12, OpenGL 4.5, OpenGL ES 3.0 and OpenCL 1.2 (on Windows).
- Package size: 25 mm × 24 mm

Model	sSpec number	Cores	Clock rate	Burst	L2 cache	GPU model	GPU frequency	Memory	TDP	SDP	Socket	Release date	Part number(s)	Release price (USD)
Pentium Silver N5000	SR3RZ (B0)	4	1.1 GHz	2.7 GHz	4 MB	UHD Graphics 605	200-750 MHz	2 × LPDDR4-2400	6 W	4.8 W	FC-BGA 1090	December 2017	FH8068003067406	

==== "Gemini Lake Refresh" (14 nm) ====
- All models support: MMX, SSE, SSE2, SSE3, SSSE3, SSE4.1, SSE4.2, Enhanced Intel SpeedStep Technology (EIST), Intel 64, XD bit (an NX bit implementation), Intel VT-x, Intel VT-d, AES-NI, Intel SGX.
- GPU and memory controller are integrated onto the processor die
- GPU is based on Kaby Lake Intel HD Graphics, with 18 execution units, and supports DirectX 12, OpenGL 4.5, OpenGL ES 3.0 and OpenCL 1.2 (on Windows).
- Package size: 25 mm × 24 mm

Model	sSpec number	Cores	Clock rate	Burst	L2 cache	GPU model	GPU frequency	Memory	TDP	SDP	Socket	Release date	Part number(s)	Release price (USD)
Pentium Silver N5030	SRFDC (R0)	4	1.1 GHz	3.1 GHz	4 MB	UHD Graphics 605	200-750 MHz	2 × LPDDR4-2400	6 W	4.8 W	FC-BGA 1090	December 2019	FH8068003067442	

=== Kaby Lake based Pentiums ===
==== "Kaby Lake-U" (14 nm) ====
- All models support: MMX, SSE, SSE2, SSE3, SSSE3, SSE4.1, SSE4.2, SGX, MPX, Hyper-threading, Enhanced Intel SpeedStep Technology (EIST), Intel 64, XD bit (an NX bit implementation), Intel VT-x, Intel VT-d, AES-NI, Smart Cache, and configurable TDP (cTDP) down.

Model	sSpec number	Cores (threads)	Clock rate	Turbo	L2 cache	L3 cache	GPU model	GPU frequency	TDP	Socket	I/O bus	Release date	Part number(s)	Release price (USD)
Pentium Gold 4415U	SR348 (H0)	2 (4)	2.3 GHz	—N/a	2 × 256 KB	2 MB	HD Graphics 610	300–950 MHz	15 W	BGA 1356	DMI 3.0	January 2017	FJ8067702739932	

Note: Pentium 4415U was renamed to Pentium Gold 4415U (end 2017).

==== "Kaby Lake-Y" (14 nm) ====
- All models support: MMX, SSE, SSE2, SSE3, SSSE3, SSE4.1, SSE4.2, SGX, MPX, Hyper-threading, Enhanced Intel SpeedStep Technology (EIST), Intel 64, XD bit (an NX bit implementation), Intel VT-x, Intel VT-d, AES-NI, Smart Cache, and configurable TDP (cTDP) down.

Model	sSpec number	Cores (threads)	Clock rate	Turbo	L2 cache	L3 cache	GPU model	GPU frequency	TDP	Socket	I/O bus	Release date	Part number(s)	Release price (USD)
Pentium Gold 4410Y	SR34B (H0)	2 (4)	1.5 GHz	—N/a	2 × 256 KB	2 MB	HD Graphics 615	300–850 MHz	6 W	BGA 1515	DMI 3.0	January 2017	HE8067702740013	
Pentium Gold 4415Y	SR3GA (H0)	2 (4)	1.6 GHz	—N/a	2 × 256 KB	2 MB	HD Graphics 615	300–850 MHz	6 W	BGA 1515	DMI 3.0	June 2017	HE8067702740018	

==== "Kaby Lake Refresh" (14 nm) ====
- All models support: MMX, SSE, SSE2, SSE3, SSSE3, SSE4.1, SSE4.2, SGX, MPX, Hyper-threading, Enhanced Intel SpeedStep Technology (EIST), Intel 64, XD bit (an NX bit implementation), Intel VT-x, Intel VT-d, AES-NI, Smart Cache, and configurable TDP (cTDP) down.

Model	sSpec number	Cores (threads)	Clock rate	Turbo	L2 cache	L3 cache	GPU model	GPU frequency	TDP	Socket	I/O bus	Release date	Part number(s)	Release price (USD)
Pentium Gold 4417U	SRESH (Y0)	2 (4)	2.3 GHz	—N/a	2 × 256 KB	2 MB	HD Graphics 610	300–950 MHz	15 W	BGA 1356	DMI 3.0	January 2019	FJ8067703282813	

==== "Amber Lake-Y" (14 nm) ====
- All models support: MMX, SSE, SSE2, SSE3, SSSE3, SSE4.1, SSE4.2, SGX, MPX, Hyper-threading, Enhanced Intel SpeedStep Technology (EIST), Intel 64, XD bit (an NX bit implementation), Intel VT-x, Intel VT-d, AES-NI, Smart Cache, and configurable TDP (cTDP) down.
- Pentium Gold 6500Y also support: AVX, AVX2, FMA3, Turbo Boost, and configurable TDP (cTDP) up.

Model	sSpec number	Cores (threads)	Clock rate	Turbo	L2 cache	L3 cache	GPU model	GPU frequency	TDP	Socket	I/O bus	Release date	Part number(s)	Release price (USD)
Pentium Gold 4425Y	SRD24 (H0)	2 (4)	1.7 GHz	—N/a	2 × 256 KB	2 MB	HD Graphics 615	300–850 MHz	6 W	BGA 1515	DMI 3.0	February 2019	HE8067702740049	
Pentium Gold 6500Y		2 (4)	1.1 GHz	3.4 GHz	2 × 256 KB	4 MB	UHD Graphics 615	300–900 MHz	5 W	BGA 1515	DMI 3.0	January 2021		

=== Coffee Lake based Pentiums ===
==== "Whiskey Lake-U" (14 nm) ====
Model	sSpec number	Cores (threads)	Clock rate	Turbo	L2 cache	L3 cache	GPU model	GPU frequency	TDP	Socket	I/O bus	Release date	Part number(s)	Release price (USD)
Pentium Gold 5405U	SRESL (W0); SRFG1 (V0)	2 (4)	2.3 GHz	—N/a	2 × 256 KB	2 MB	UHD Graphics 610	300–950 MHz	15 W	BGA 1528	DMI 3.0	January 2019	CL8068404080703; CL8068404080706	

=== Comet Lake based Pentiums ===
==== "Comet Lake-U" (14 nm) ====
Model	sSpec number	Cores (threads)	Clock rate	Turbo	L2 cache	L3 cache	GPU model	GPU frequency	TDP	Socket	I/O bus	Release date	Part number(s)	Release price (USD)
Pentium Gold 6405U	SRGL2 (V0)	2 (4)	2.4 GHz	—N/a	2 × 256 KB	2 MB	UHD Graphics 610	300–950 MHz	15 W	BGA 1528	DMI 3.0	October 2019	FJ8070104307703	

=== Ice Lake based Pentiums ===
==== "Ice Lake-U" (10 nm) ====
Model	sSpec number	Cores (threads)	Clock rate	Turbo	L2 cache	L3 cache	GPU model	GPU frequency	TDP	Socket	I/O bus	Release date	Part number(s)	Release price (USD)
Pentium 6805	SRK0U (D1)	2 (4)	1.1 GHz	3.0 GHz	2 × 512 KB	4 MB	UHD Graphics (32 EU)	300–850 MHz	15 W	BGA 1526		Q4 2020	FJ8068904310016	

=== Tiger Lake based Pentiums ===
==== "Tiger Lake-UP3" (10 nm SuperFin) ====
- All models support: SSE4.1, SSE4.2, AVX2, FMA3, Speed Shift Technology (SST), Intel 64, Intel VT-x, Intel VT-d, Turbo Boost, Hyper-threading, AES-NI, Smart Cache, DL Boost, Optane memory, GNA 2.0, IPU6, TB4.

Model	sSpec number	Cores (threads)	Clock rate	Turbo	L2 cache	L3 cache	GPU model	GPU frequency	TDP	Memory	Release date	Part number(s)	Release price (USD)
Pentium Gold 7505	SRK0A (B1)	2 (4)	2 GHz	3.5 GHz	2 × 1.25 MB	4 MB	UHD Graphics (48 EU)	?–1250 MHz	15 W	2× LPDDR4X-3733; 2× DDR4-3200	October 2020	FH8069004531802	

=== Tremont based Pentiums ===
==== "Jasper Lake" (10 nm) ====
- All models support: MMX, SSE, SSE2, SSE3, SSSE3, SSE4.1, SSE4.2, Enhanced Intel SpeedStep Technology (EIST), Intel 64, XD bit (an NX bit implementation), Intel VT-x, Intel VT-d, AES-NI, Intel SHA Extensions, MBEC, SMAP/SMEP
- Package size: 35 mm x 24 mm
- DDR4/LPDDR4 dual-channel memory controller supporting up to 16 GB
- Display controller with 1 MIPI DSI 1.2 port and 3 DDI ports (eDP 1.4b, MIPI DSI 1.2, DP 1.4a, or HDMI 2.0b)
- Integrated Intel HD Graphics (Gen11) GPU
- PCI Express 3.0 controller supporting 8 lanes (multiplexed); 4 lanes available externally
- Two USB 3.2 2x1 ports (a.k.a. USB 3.1)
- Four USB 3.2 1x1 ports (a.k.a. USB 3.0)
- Eight USB 2.0 ports
- Two SATA-600 ports
- Integrated HD audio controller
- Integrated image signal processor supporting four cameras (three concurrent)
- Integrated memory card reader supporting SDIO 3.0 and eMMC 5.1
- Serial I/O supporting SPI, HSUART (serial port) and I2C
- Integrated CNVi with Wi-Fi 6 (IEEE 802.11ax 1x1 and 2x2) and Bluetooth 5.x (using UART/I2S/USB2)

Model	sSpec number	Cores	Clock rate	Burst	L2 cache	L3 cache	GPU model	GPU frequency	Memory	TDP	Socket	Release date	Part number(s)	Release price (USD)
Pentium Silver N6000	SRKGY (A1)	4	1.1 GHz	3.3 GHz	1.5 MB	4 MB	UHD Graphics (32 EUs)	350-850 MHz	2 × DDR4/LPDDR4X-2933	6 W	FC-BGA 1338	January 2021	DC8069704609905	
Pentium Silver N6005	SRKGU (A1)	4	2.0 GHz	3.3 GHz	1.5 MB	4 MB	UHD Graphics (32 EUs)	450-900 MHz	2 × DDR4/LPDDR4X-2933	10 W	FC-BGA 1338	January 2021	DC8069704609807	

=== Alder Lake based Pentiums ===
==== "Alder Lake-U" (Intel 7) ====
- All models support: SSE4.1, SSE4.2, AVX, AVX2, FMA3, Speed Shift Technology (SST), Intel 64, Intel VT-x, Intel VT-d, Hyper-threading, Turbo Boost, AES-NI, IPU6 (except SRLFV), TB4, Smart Cache, Thread Director, DL Boost, and GNA 3.0.
- Support 20 lanes (UP3) or 14 lanes (UP4) of PCI Express 4.0/3.0.
- All models support up to LPDDR5-5200 or LPDDR4X-4266 memory
- Standard power models also support up to DDR5-4800 or DDR4-3200 memory.

Model number	P-core (performance)				E-core (efficiency)				L3 cache	GPU model	GPU frequency	Power		Socket	I/O bus	Release date	sSpec number	Part number(s)
Model number	Cores (threads)	Freq.	Turbo	L2 cache	Cores (threads)	Freq.	Turbo	L2 cache	L3 cache	GPU model	GPU frequency	Base	Max Turbo	Socket	I/O bus	Release date	sSpec number	Part number(s)
Standard power (UP3)
Pentium 8505	1 (2)	1.2 GHz	4.4 GHz	1 × 1.25 MB	4 (4)	0.9 GHz	3.3 GHz	1 × 2 MB	8 MB	UHD Graphics (48 EU)	?–1100 MHz	15 W	55 W	BGA 1744	DMI 4.0 ×8	February 2022	SRLFV (R0); SRLFW (R0)	FJ8071504827200; FJ8071504827201
Low power (UP4)
Pentium 8500	1 (2)	1.0 GHz	4.4 GHz	1 × 1.25 MB	4 (4)	0.7 GHz	3.3 GHz	1 × 2 MB	8 MB	UHD Graphics (48 EU)	?–800 MHz	9 W	29 W	BGA 1781	DMI 4.0 ×8	February 2022		

== Server processors ==
=== Sandy Bridge based Pentiums ===
==== "Sandy Bridge" (32 nm) ====
- All models support: MMX, SSE, SSE2, SSE3, SSSE3, SSE4.1, SSE4.2, Enhanced Intel SpeedStep Technology (EIST), Intel 64, XD bit (an NX bit implementation), Intel VT-x, Smart Cache, Hyper-threading.
- No models include HD Graphics.
- Transistors: 624 or 504 million
- Die size: 149 or 131 mm2

Model	sSpec number	Cores	Clock rate	Turbo	L2 cache	L3 cache	GPU model	GPU frequency	TDP	Socket	I/O bus	Release date	Part number(s)	Release price (USD)
Pentium 350	SR0FT (Q0)	2	1.2 GHz	—N/a	2 × 256 KB	3 MB	—N/a	—N/a	15 W	LGA 1155	DMI 2.0	November 25, 2011	CM8062301140700	

==== "Sandy Bridge-EN" (32 nm) ====
- Based on Sandy Bridge-E CPU.
- All models support: MMX, SSE, SSE2, SSE3, SSSE3, SSE4.1, SSE4.2, AVX, Enhanced Intel SpeedStep Technology (EIST), Intel 64, XD bit (an NX bit implementation), TXT, Intel VT-x, Intel VT-d, AES-NI, Smart Cache.

Model	sSpec number	Cores	Clock rate	Turbo	L2 cache	L3 cache	TDP	Socket	I/O bus	Memory	Release date	Part number(s)	Release price (USD)
standard power
Pentium 1403	SR0LQ (M1)	2	2.6 GHz	—N/a	2 × 256 KB	5 MB	80 W	LGA 1356	DMI 2.0	3 × DDR3-1066	May 14, 2012	CM8062007188500	
Pentium 1407	SR0LP (M1)	2	2.8 GHz	—N/a	2 × 256 KB	5 MB	80 W	LGA 1356	DMI 2.0	3 × DDR3-1066	May 14, 2012	CM8062007188404	
low power
Pentium 1405	SR0M7 (M1)	2	1.2 GHz	1.8 GHz	2 × 256 KB	5 MB	40 W	LGA 1356	DMI 2.0	3 × DDR3-1066	August 2012	CM8062001093700	

=== Ivy Bridge based Pentiums ===
==== "Ivy Bridge-EN" (22 nm) ====
- All models support: MMX, SSE, SSE2, SSE3, SSSE3, SSE4.1, SSE4.2, AVX, F16C, Enhanced Intel SpeedStep Technology (EIST), Intel 64, XD bit (an NX bit implementation), TXT, Intel VT-x, Intel EPT, Intel VT-d, Intel VT-c, Intel x8 SDDC, AES-NI, Smart Cache.
- Support for up to 6 DIMMS of DDR3 memory.

Model	sSpec number	Cores	Clock rate	Turbo	L2 cache	L3 cache	TDP	Socket	I/O bus	Memory	Release date	Part number(s)	Release price (USD)
standard power
Pentium 1403 v2	SR1B1 (S1)	2	2.6 GHz	—N/a	2 × 256 KB	6 MB	80 W	LGA 1356	DMI 2.0	3 × DDR3-1600	Jan 9, 2014	CM8063401376602	
low power
Pentium 1405 v2	SR1AW (S1)	2	1.4 GHz	—N/a	2 × 256 KB	6 MB	40 W	LGA 1356	DMI 2.0	3 × DDR3-1600	Jan 9, 2014	CM8063401294304	

=== Broadwell based Pentiums ===
==== "Broadwell-DE" (14 nm, SoC) ====
- All models support: MMX, SSE, SSE2, SSE3, SSSE3, SSE4.1, SSE4.2, AVX, F16C, Enhanced Intel SpeedStep Technology (EIST), Intel 64, XD bit (an NX bit implementation), TXT, Intel VT-x, Intel EPT, Intel VT-d, AES-NI, Smart Cache, ECC memory.
- D1508, D1517, D1519 also support Hyper-threading, Turbo Boost.
- SoC peripherals include 8 × USB (4 × 2.0, 4 × 3.0), 6 × SATA, 2 × Integrated 10 GbE LAN, UART, GPIO, and 32 lanes of PCI Express (8 × 2.0, 24 × 3.0), in ×16, ×8 and ×4 configurations.
- Support for up to four DIMMs of DDR4 or DDR3L memory per CPU socket.

Model	sSpec number	Cores	Clock rate	Turbo	L2 cache	L3 cache	TDP	Socket	I/O bus	Memory	Release date	Part number(s)	Release price (USD)
Dual Core
Pentium D1507	SR2DP (V2)	2	1.2 GHz	—N/a	2 × 256 KB	3 MB	20 W	FC-BGA 1667	DMI 2.0	2 × DDR4-2133; 2 × DDR3L-1600	November 2015	GG8067402569800	
Pentium D1508	SR2DQ (V2)	2	2.2 GHz	2.6 GHz	2 × 256 KB	3 MB	25 W	FC-BGA 1667	DMI 2.0	2 × DDR4-2133; 2 × DDR3L-1600	November 2015	GG8067402569900	
Pentium D1509	SR2JA (V2)	2	1.5 GHz	—N/a	2 × 256 KB	3 MB	19 W	FC-BGA 1667	DMI 2.0	2 × DDR4-2133; 2 × DDR3L-1600	November 2015	GG8067402570103	
Quad Core
Pentium D1517	SR2GG (V2)	4	1.6 GHz	2.2 GHz	4 × 256 KB	6 MB	25 W	FC-BGA 1667	DMI 2.0	2 × DDR4-2133; 2 × DDR3L-1600	November 2015	GG8067402612800	
Pentium D1519	SR2DM (V2)	4	1.5 GHz	2.1 GHz	4 × 256 KB	6 MB	25 W	FC-BGA 1667	DMI 2.0	2 × DDR4-2133; 2 × DDR3L-1600	April 2016	GG8067402569601	

== Embedded processors ==
=== Sandy Bridge based Pentiums ===
==== "Gladden" (32 nm) ====
- All models support: MMX, SSE, SSE2, SSE3, SSSE3, SSE4.1, SSE4.2, AVX, Enhanced Intel SpeedStep Technology (EIST), Intel 64, XD bit (an NX bit implementation), Intel VT-x, EPT, Hyper-threading, Smart Cache, ECC memory.
- Transistors:
- Die size:

Model	sSpec number	Cores	Clock rate	Turbo	L2 cache	L3 cache	GPU model	GPU frequency	TDP	Socket	I/O bus	Release date	Part number(s)	Release price (USD)
standard power
Pentium B915C	SR0NZ (Q0)	2	1.5 GHz	—N/a	2 × 256 KB	3 MB	—N/a	—N/a	15 W	FC-BGA1284	DMI 2.0	Q2 2012	AV8062701147401	

==== "Gladden" (22 nm) ====
Model	sSpec number	Cores	Clock rate	Turbo	L2 cache	L3 cache	GPU model	GPU frequency	TDP	Socket	I/O bus	Release date	Part number(s)	Release price (USD)
standard power
Pentium B925C	SR1J3	2	2 GHz	—N/a	2 × 256 KB	4 MB	—N/a	—N/a	15 W	FC-BGA1284	DMI 2.0	Sept 10, 2013	CN8063801307903	

=== Tremont based Pentiums ===
==== "Elkhart Lake" (10 nm SuperFin) ====
- All models support: MMX, SSE, SSE2, SSE3, SSSE3, SSE4.1, SSE4.2, Intel 64, XD bit (an NX bit implementation), Intel VT-x, Intel VT-d, AES-NI.
- GPU is based on Gen11 Intel HD Graphics, with up to 32 execution units, and supports up to 3 displays (4K @ 60 Hz) through HDMI, DP, eDP, or DSI.
- SoC peripherals include 4 × USB 2.0/3.0/3.1, 2 × SATA, 3 × 2.5GbE LAN, UART, and up to 8 lanes of PCI Express 3.0 in x4, x2, and x1 configurations.
- Package size: 35 mm × 24 mm

Model	sSpec number	Cores	Clock rate	Burst	L2 cache	GPU model	GPU frequency	Memory	TDP	SDP	Socket	Release date	Part number(s)	Release price (USD)
Pentium N6415	SRKLA (B1)	4	1.2 GHz	3.0 GHz	1.5 MB	UHD Graphics (16 EUs)	350–800 MHz	4 × LPDDR4X-3200; 2 × DDR4-3200	6.5 W	—N/a	FC-BGA 1493	Q1 2021	DC8070304190820	
Pentium J6426	SRKUB (B1)	4	2.0 GHz	3.0 GHz	1.5 MB	UHD Graphics (32 EUs)	400–850 MHz	4 × LPDDR4X-3200; 2 × DDR4-3200	10 W	—N/a	FC-BGA 1493	Q1 2021	DC8070304190882	

== See also ==
- Pentium
- List of Intel processors
- Comparison of Intel processors

Legacy architectures:

- List of Intel Pentium Pro processors
- List of Intel Pentium II processors
- List of Intel Pentium III processors
- List of Intel Pentium 4 processors
- List of Intel Pentium D processors
- List of Intel Pentium M processors
- List of Intel Core processors
- List of Intel Core 2 processors
- List of Intel Celeron processors

Current architectures:

- List of Intel Core i3 processors
- List of Intel Core i5 processors
- List of Intel Core i7 processors
- List of Intel Core i9 processors
