= Intel Upgrade Service =

Controversial paid service by Intel

An example of an Intel Upgrade Card

The Intel Upgrade Service was a relatively short-lived and controversial program of Intel that allowed some low-end processors to have additional features unlocked by paying a fee and obtaining an activation code that was then entered in a software program, which ran on Windows 7.

The program was introduced in September 2010 for the Clarkdale-based Pentium G6951 desktop processor (operating at 2.8 GHz), and immediately met with criticism from the specialist press. For a $50 fee, this processor could have one additional megabyte of cache enabled, as well as hyper-threading, making it almost like the Core i3-530, except for the slightly lower frequency that remained unchanged—the i3-530 operated at 2.93 GHz. The official designation for the software-upgraded processor was Pentium G6952. In order for the activation software to work, the motherboard had to have the DH55TC or DH55PJ chipset. One reviewer noted that at the market price of the time one could actually buy the i3-530 for only $15 more than the baseline Pentium G6951, making the upgrade premium card a very questionable proposition at the official price.

The program was extended in 2011 to the Sandy Bridge series of processors as follows:

- the Core i3-2312M (2.1 GHz, 3 MB cache) laptop processor could be upgraded to the Core i3-2393M with higher frequency and more cache (2.5 GHz, 4 MB cache)
- the Core i3-2102 (3.1 GHz, 3 MB cache) desktop processor could be upgraded to the Core i3-2153 with a higher frequency (3.6 GHz)
- the Pentium G622 (2.6 GHz, 3 MB cache) desktop processor could be upgraded to the Pentium G693 with a higher frequency (3.2 GHz)
- the Pentium G632 (2.7 GHz, 3 MB cache) desktop processor could be upgraded to the Pentium G694 with a higher frequency (3.3 GHz)

The Sandy Bridge upgrade program was available in U.S., Canada, Mexico, Brazil, Peru, the Netherlands, Germany, the Philippines, and Indonesia.

Intel initially defended the program, but it was eventually discontinued in 2011.

== See also ==
- Crippleware
- Overclocking
- Product binning
- Total cost of ownership
