= H57 =

H57 or H-57 may refer to:

- H-57 (Michigan county highway)
- H-57 Sea Ranger, a military designation for the Bell 206 helicopter
- HMS Hesperus (H57), a Royal Navy H-class destroyer
- H57, an Intel 5 Series chipset
