= Intel Communication Streaming Architecture =

Computer motherboard communication architecture

Intel's Communication Streaming Architecture (CSA) was a mechanism used in the Intel Hub Architecture to increase the bandwidth available between a network card and the CPU. It directly connected the network controller to the Memory Controller Hub (northbridge), instead of to the I/O Controller Hub (southbridge) through the PCI bus, which was the common practice until that point.

The technology was only used in Intel chipsets released in 2003. It was largely seen as a stop-gap measure to allow Gigabit Ethernet chips to run at full-speed until the arrival of a faster expansion bus. It was also used to connect the Wireless networking chips in Intel's Centrino mobile platform. CSA-connected Ethernet chips showed consistently higher transfer rates than comparable PCI cards.

Shortly after the CSA was introduced, PCI Express was introduced and replaced the CSA stopgap. The technology was subsequently discontinued.
