= Q57 =

Q57 may refer to:

- Q57 (New York City bus)
- Al-Hadid, a surah of the Quran
- French submarine Thermidor
- Intel Q57, an Intel 5 Series chipset
