= Nehalem (microarchitecture) =

CPU microarchitecture by Intel

- Logo for Core i7 Bloomfield processors

General information
- Launched: November 11, 2008; 17 years ago
- Marketed by: Intel
- Designed by: Intel
- Common manufacturer: Intel

Performance
- Max. CPU clock rate: 1.06 GHz to 3.33 GHz
- QPI speeds: 4.80 GT/s to 6.40 GT/s
- DMI speeds: 2 GT/s

Physical specifications
- Transistors: 731M to 2300M 45 nm
- Cores: 1-6 (1-8 Xeon)
- Sockets: LGA 1156; LGA 1366; LGA 1567; μPGA 988

Cache
- L1 cache: 64 KB per core (32 KB data + 32 KB instructions)
- L2 cache: 256 KB per core
- L3 cache: 2 MB to 24 MB shared

Architecture and classification
- Technology node: 45 nm
- Microarchitecture: Nehalem
- Instruction set: x86-16, IA-32, x86-64
- Instructions: MMX, SSE, SSE2, SSE3, SSSE3, SSE4.1, SSE4.2
- Extensions: VT-x, VT-d

Products, models, variants
- Core names: Clarksfield; Lynnfield; Bloomfield; Jasper Forest; Gainestown (Nehalem-EP); Beckton (Nehalem-EX); ~~Aubrurndale~~; ~~Havendale~~
- Product code name: NHM
- Models: Core i5-7xx; Core i7-8xx; Core i7-9xx Extreme; Xeon 3000/5000/7000; Mobile Core i7-7xxQM; Mobile Core i7-8xxQM; Mobile Core i7-9xxXM Extreme

History
- Predecessors: Core (tock); Penryn (tick)
- Successors: Westmere (tick); Sandy Bridge (tock)

Support status
- Unsupported

Nehalem /nəˈheɪləm/ is the codename for Intel's 45 nm microarchitecture released in November 2008. It was used in the first generation of the Intel Core i5 and i7 processors, and is a major evolution over the older Core microarchitecture, which is used by Core 2 processors and is the previous iteration of the P6 microarchitecture series which started in 1995 with the Pentium Pro. The term "Nehalem" comes from the Nehalem River.

Nehalem is built on the 45 nm process, is able to run at higher clock speeds without sacrificing efficiency, and is more energy-efficient than Penryn microprocessors. Hyper-threading is reintroduced, along with a reduction in L2 cache size, as well as an enlarged L3 cache that is shared among all cores. Nehalem is an architecture that differs radically from NetBurst, while retaining some of the latter's minor features.

Nehalem later received a die-shrink to 32 nm with Westmere, and was fully succeeded by "second-generation" Sandy Bridge in January 2011.

== Technology ==
Microarchitecture of a processor core in the quad-core implementation

The Nehalem microarchitecture evolved from the Core microarchitecture by introducing:

- Cache line block on L2/L3 cache was reduced from 128 bytes in NetBurst & Merom/Penryn to 64 bytes per line in this generation (same size as Yonah and Pentium M).
- Hyper-threading technology again.
- Intel Turbo Boost 1.0.
- 2–24 MiB L3 cache with Smart Cache in some models.
- Instruction Fetch Unit (IFU) containing second-level branch predictor with two level Branch Target Buffer (BTB) and Return Stack Buffer (RSB). Nehalem also supports all predictor types previously used in Intel's processors like Indirect Predictor and Loop Detector.
- sTLB (second level unified translation lookaside buffer) (i.e. both instructions and data) that contains 512 entries for small pages only, and is again 4 way associative.
- 3 integer ALU, 2 vector ALU and 2 AGU per core.
- Native (all processor cores on a single die) quad-, hex-, and octa-core processors
- Intel QuickPath Interconnect in HEDT, server, and workstation models and Direct Media Interface on other models replacing the legacy front side bus.
- 64 KB L1 cache per core (32 KB L1 data and 32 KB L1 instruction), and 256 KB L2 cache per core.
- Integration of PCI Express and DMI into the processor in mid-range models, replacing the northbridge.
- Integrated memory controller supporting two or three memory channels of DDR3 SDRAM or four FB-DIMM2 channels.
- Second-generation Intel Virtualization Technology, which introduced Extended Page Table support, virtual processor identifiers (VPIDs), and non-maskable interrupt-window exiting.
- SSE4.2 and POPCNT instructions.
- Macro-op fusion now works in 64-bit mode.
- 20 to 24 pipeline stages.

Translation lookaside buffer sizes
Cache		Page Size	
Name	Level	4 KB	2 MB
DTLB	1st	64	32
ITLB	1st	128	7 / logical core
STLB	2nd	512	none

== Performance and power improvements ==
It has been reported that Nehalem has a focus on performance, thus the increased core size. Compared to Penryn, Nehalem has:

- 10–25% better single-threaded performance / 20–100% better multithreaded performance at the same power level
- 30% lower power consumption for the same performance
- On average, Nehalem provides a 15–20% clock-for-clock increase in performance per core.

Overclocking is possible with Bloomfield processors and the X58 chipset. Lynnfield processors use a PCH removing the need for a northbridge.

Nehalem processors incorporate SSE4.2 SIMD instructions, adding seven new instructions to the SSE 4.1 set in the Core 2 series. The Nehalem architecture reduces atomic operation latency by 50% in an attempt to eliminate overhead on atomic operations such as the LOCK CMPXCHG compare-and-swap instruction.

== Variants ==
Processing Cores (interface)	Process	Die Size	million transistors	CPUID	Model	Stepping	Mobile	Desktop, UP Server	DP Server	MP Server
Eight-Core (Quad-Channel)	45 nm	684 mm^{2}	2.300	206E6	46	D0				Beckton (80604)
Quad-Core (Triple-Channel)	45 nm	263 mm^{2}	731	106A4; 106A5	26	C0/C1; D0		Bloomfield (80601)	Gainestown (80602)	
Quad-Core (Dual-Channel, PCIe)	45 nm	296 mm^{2}	774	106E4; 106E5	30	B0; B1	Clarksfield (80607)	Lynnfield (80605)	Jasper Forest (80612)	
Dual-Core (Dual-Channel, PCIe, Graphics Core)	45 nm		?				Auburndale (80608) (canceled)	Havendale (80606) (canceled)		

- Lynnfield processors feature 16 PCIe lanes, which can be used in 1x16 or 2x8 configuration.
- ^{1} 6500 series scalable up to 2 sockets, 7500 series scalable up to 4/8 sockets.

=== Server, workstation, and desktop processors ===
Codename	Market	Cores (threads)	Socket	Processor Branding & Model		CPU Clock rate	Turbo	TDP	Interfaces		L3 cache	Release date	Price
Codename	Market	Cores (threads)	Socket	Processor Branding & Model		CPU Clock rate	Turbo	TDP	Chipset	Memory	L3 cache	Release date	Price
Beckton^{1}	MP Server / DP Server	8 (16)	LGA; 1567	Xeon 7000	X7560	2.26 GHz	Yes	130 W	4× QPI 6.4 GT/s	DDR3-800 / 1066 (Up to 4x with SMB-Ready motherboard)	24 MB	2010-03-30	$3692
Beckton^{1}	MP Server / DP Server	8 (16)	LGA; 1567	Xeon 7000	X7550	2.0 GHz	Yes	130 W	4× QPI 6.4 GT/s	DDR3-800 / 1066 (Up to 4x with SMB-Ready motherboard)	18 MB	2010-03-30	$2837
Beckton^{1}	MP Server / DP Server	8 (16)	LGA; 1567	Xeon 7000	X6550	2.0 GHz	Yes	130 W	4× QPI 6.4 GT/s	DDR3-800 / 1066 (Up to 4x with SMB-Ready motherboard)	18 MB	2010-03-30	$2461
Beckton^{1}	MP Server / DP Server	8 (16)	LGA; 1567	Xeon 7000	L7555	1.86 GHz	Yes	95 W	4× QPI 5.86 GT/s	DDR3-800 / 1066 (Up to 4x with SMB-Ready motherboard)	24 MB	2010-03-30	$3157
Beckton^{1}	MP Server / DP Server	6 (12)	LGA; 1567	Xeon 7000	E7540	2.0 GHz	Yes	105 W	4× QPI 6.4 GT/s	DDR3-800 / 1066 (Up to 4x with SMB-Ready motherboard)	18 MB	2010-03-30	$1980
Beckton^{1}	MP Server / DP Server	6 (12)	LGA; 1567	Xeon 7000	E6540	2.0 GHz	Yes	105 W	4× QPI 6.4 GT/s	DDR3-800 / 1066 (Up to 4x with SMB-Ready motherboard)	12 MB	2010-03-30	$1712
Beckton^{1}	MP Server / DP Server	6 (12)	LGA; 1567	Xeon 7000	E7530	1.86 GHz	Yes	105 W	4× QPI 5.86 GT/s	DDR3-800 / 1066 (Up to 4x with SMB-Ready motherboard)	12 MB	2010-03-30	$1391
Beckton^{1}	MP Server / DP Server	6 (12)	LGA; 1567	Xeon 7000	L7545	1.86 GHz	Yes	95 W	4× QPI 5.86 GT/s	DDR3-800 / 1066 (Up to 4x with SMB-Ready motherboard)	18 MB	2010-03-30	$2087
Beckton^{1}	MP Server / DP Server	6 (6)	LGA; 1567	Xeon 7000	X7542	2.66 GHz	Yes	130 W	4× QPI 5.86 GT/s	DDR3-800 / 1066 (Up to 4x with SMB-Ready motherboard)	18 MB	2010-03-30	$1980
Beckton^{1}	MP Server / DP Server	4 (8)	LGA; 1567	Xeon 7000	E7520	1.86 GHz	No	105 W	4× QPI 4.8 GT/s	DDR3-800 / 1066 (Up to 4x with SMB-Ready motherboard)	18 MB	2010-03-30	$856
Beckton^{1}	MP Server / DP Server	4 (8)	LGA; 1567	Xeon 7000	E6510	1.73 GHz	No	105 W	4× QPI 4.8 GT/s	DDR3-800 / 1066 (Up to 4x with SMB-Ready motherboard)	12 MB	2010-03-30	$744
Gainestown	DP Server	4 (8)	LGA; 1366	Xeon 5000	W5590	3.33 GHz	Yes	130 W	2× QPI 6.4 GT/s	3× DDR3-1333^{1}	8 MB	2009-08-09	$1600
Gainestown	DP Server	4 (8)	LGA; 1366	Xeon 5000	W5580	3.2 GHz	Yes	130 W	2× QPI 6.4 GT/s	3× DDR3-1333^{1}	8 MB	2009-03-29	$1500
Gainestown	DP Server	4 (8)	LGA; 1366	Xeon 5000	X5570	2.93 GHz	Yes	95 W	2× QPI 6.4 GT/s	3× DDR3-1333^{1}	8 MB	2009-03-29	$1286
Gainestown	DP Server	4 (8)	LGA; 1366	Xeon 5000	X5560	2.8 GHz	Yes	95 W	2× QPI 6.4 GT/s	3× DDR3-1333^{1}	8 MB	2009-03-29	$1072
Gainestown	DP Server	4 (8)	LGA; 1366	Xeon 5000	X5550	2.66 GHz	Yes	95 W	2× QPI 6.4 GT/s	3× DDR3-1333^{1}	8 MB	2009-03-29	$858
Gainestown	DP Server	4 (8)	LGA; 1366	Xeon 5000	E5540	2.53 GHz	Yes	80 W	2× 5.86 GT/s	3× DDR3-1066^{1}	8 MB	2009-03-29	$744
Gainestown	DP Server	4 (8)	LGA; 1366	Xeon 5000	E5530	2.4 GHz	Yes	80 W	2× 5.86 GT/s	3× DDR3-1066^{1}	8 MB	2009-03-29	$530
Gainestown	DP Server	4 (8)	LGA; 1366	Xeon 5000	E5520	2.26 GHz	Yes	80 W	2× 5.86 GT/s	3× DDR3-1066^{1}	8 MB	2009-03-29	$373
Gainestown	DP Server	4 (8)	LGA; 1366	Xeon 5000	L5530	2.4 GHz	Yes	60 W	2× 5.86 GT/s	3× DDR3-1066^{1}	8 MB	2009-08-09	$744
Gainestown	DP Server	4 (8)	LGA; 1366	Xeon 5000	L5520	2.26 GHz	Yes	60 W	2× 5.86 GT/s	3× DDR3-1066^{1}	8 MB	2009-03-30	$530
Gainestown	DP Server	4 (8)	LGA; 1366	Xeon 5000	L5518	2.13 GHz	Yes	60 W	2× 5.86 GT/s	3× DDR3-1066^{1}	8 MB	2009-03-30	$
Gainestown	DP Server	4 (4)	LGA; 1366	Xeon 5000	E5507	2.26 GHz	No	80 W	2× 4.8 GT/s	3× DDR3-800^{1}	4 MB	2010-03-16	$266
Gainestown	DP Server	4 (4)	LGA; 1366	Xeon 5000	E5506	2.13 GHz	No	80 W	2× 4.8 GT/s	3× DDR3-800^{1}	4 MB	2009-03-29	$266
Gainestown	DP Server	4 (4)	LGA; 1366	Xeon 5000	L5506	2.13 GHz	No	60 W	2× 4.8 GT/s	3× DDR3-800^{1}	4 MB	2009-03-29	$423
Gainestown	DP Server	4 (4)	LGA; 1366	Xeon 5000	E5504	2.0 GHz	No	80 W	2× 4.8 GT/s	3× DDR3-800^{1}	4 MB	2009-03-29	$224
Gainestown	DP Server	2 (4)	LGA; 1366	Xeon 5000	L5508	2.0 GHz	Yes	38 W	2× 5.86 GT/s	3× DDR3-1066	8 MB	2009-03-29	$
Gainestown	DP Server	2 (2)	LGA; 1366	Xeon 5000	E5503	2.0 GHz	No	80 W	2× 4.8 GT/s	3× DDR3-800	4 MB	2010-03-16	$224
Gainestown	DP Server	2 (2)	LGA; 1366	Xeon 5000	E5502	1.86 GHz	No	80 W	2× 4.8 GT/s	3× DDR3-800	4 MB	2009-03-29	$188
Jasper Forest	DP Server	4 (8)	LGA; 1366	Xeon 5000	EC5549	2.53 GHz	Yes	85 W	1× 5.86 GT/s	3× DDR3-1333	8 MB	2010-02-11	$530
Jasper Forest	DP Server	4 (8)	LGA; 1366	Xeon 5000	LC5528	2.13 GHz	Yes	60 W	1× 4.8 GT/s	3× DDR3-1066	8 MB	2010-02-11	$519
Jasper Forest	DP Server	4 (8)	LGA; 1366	Xeon 5000	LC5518	1.73 GHz	Yes	48 W	1× 4.8 GT/s	3× DDR3-1066	8 MB	2010-02-11	$519
Jasper Forest	DP Server	4 (4)	LGA; 1366	Xeon 5000	EC5509	2 GHz	No	85 W	1× 4.8 GT/s	3× DDR3-1066	8 MB	2010-02-11	$265
Jasper Forest	DP Server	2 (4)	LGA; 1366	Xeon 5000	EC5539	2.27 GHz	No	65 W	1× 5.86 GT/s	3× DDR3-1333	4 MB	2010-02-11	$387
Bloomfield	UP Server	4 (8)	LGA; 1366	Xeon 3000	W3580	3.33 GHz	Yes	130 W	1× QPI 6.4 GT/s	3× DDR3-1333	8 MB	2009-08-09	$999
Bloomfield	UP Server	4 (8)	LGA; 1366	Xeon 3000	W3570	3.2 GHz	Yes	130 W	1× QPI 6.4 GT/s	3× DDR3-1333	8 MB	2009-03-29	$999
Bloomfield	UP Server	4 (8)	LGA; 1366	Xeon 3000	W3565	3.2 GHz	Yes	130 W	1× QPI 4.8 GT/s	3× DDR3-1066	8 MB	2009-11-01	$562
Bloomfield	UP Server	4 (8)	LGA; 1366	Xeon 3000	W3550	3.06 GHz	Yes	130 W	1× QPI 4.8 GT/s	3× DDR3-1066	8 MB	2009-08-09	$562
Bloomfield	UP Server	4 (8)	LGA; 1366	Xeon 3000	W3540	2.93 GHz	Yes	130 W	1× QPI 4.8 GT/s	3× DDR3-1066	8 MB	2009-03-29	$562
Bloomfield	UP Server	4 (8)	LGA; 1366	Xeon 3000	W3530	2.8 GHz	Yes	130 W	1× QPI 4.8 GT/s	3× DDR3-1066	8 MB	2010-03-16	$294
Bloomfield	UP Server	4 (8)	LGA; 1366	Xeon 3000	W3520	2.66 GHz	Yes	130 W	1× QPI 4.8 GT/s	3× DDR3-1066	8 MB	2009-03-29	$284
Bloomfield	UP Server	2 (2)	LGA; 1366	Xeon 3000	W3505	2.53 GHz	No	130 W	1× QPI 4.8 GT/s	3× DDR3-1066	4 MB	2009-03-29	$
Bloomfield	UP Server	2 (2)	LGA; 1366	Xeon 3000	W3503	2.4 GHz	No	130 W	1× QPI 4.8 GT/s	3× DDR3-1066	4 MB	2009-03-29	$
Jasper Forest	UP Server	4 (4)	LGA; 1366	Xeon 3000	EC3539	2.13 GHz	No	65 W	DMI	3× DDR3-1066	8 MB	2010-02-11	$302
Jasper Forest	UP Server	2 (4)	LGA; 1366	Xeon 3000	LC3528	1.73 GHz	Yes	35 W	DMI	3× DDR3-800	4 MB	2010-02-11	$302
Jasper Forest	UP Server	1 (1)	LGA; 1366	Xeon 3000	LC3518	1.73 GHz	No	23 W	DMI	3× DDR3-800	2 MB	2010-02-11	$192
Lynnfield	UP Server	4 (8)	LGA; 1156	Xeon 3000	X3480	3.06 GHz	Yes	95 W	DMI	2× DDR3-1333	8 MB	2010-05-30	$612
Lynnfield	UP Server	4 (8)	LGA; 1156	Xeon 3000	X3470	2.93 GHz	Yes	95 W	DMI	2× DDR3-1333	8 MB	2009-09-08	$589
Lynnfield	UP Server	4 (8)	LGA; 1156	Xeon 3000	X3460	2.8 GHz	Yes	95 W	DMI	2× DDR3-1333	8 MB	2009-09-08	$316
Lynnfield	UP Server	4 (8)	LGA; 1156	Xeon 3000	X3450	2.66 GHz	Yes	95 W	DMI	2× DDR3-1333	8 MB	2009-09-08	$241
Lynnfield	UP Server	4 (8)	LGA; 1156	Xeon 3000	X3440	2.53 GHz	Yes	95 W	DMI	2× DDR3-1333	8 MB	2009-09-08	$215
Lynnfield	UP Server	4 (8)	LGA; 1156	Xeon 3000	L3426	1.86 GHz	Yes	45 W	DMI	2× DDR3-1333	8 MB	2009-09-08	$284
Lynnfield	UP Server	4 (4)	LGA; 1156	Xeon 3000	X3430	2.4 GHz	Yes	95 W	DMI	2× DDR3-1333	8 MB	2009-09-08	$189
Bloomfield	Enthusiast; Desktop	4 (8)	LGA; 1366	Core i7 Extreme	975X	3.33 GHz	Yes	130 W	1× QPI 6.4 GT/s	3× DDR3-1066	8 MB	2009-05-31	$999
Bloomfield	Enthusiast; Desktop	4 (8)	LGA; 1366	Core i7 Extreme	965X	3.2 GHz	Yes	130 W	1× QPI 6.4 GT/s	3× DDR3-1066	8 MB	2008-11-17	$999
Bloomfield	Enthusiast; Desktop	4 (8)	LGA; 1366	Core i7	960	3.2 GHz	Yes	130 W	1× QPI 4.8 GT/s	3× DDR3-1066	8 MB	2009-10-20	$562
Bloomfield	Enthusiast; Desktop	4 (8)	LGA; 1366	Core i7	950	3.06 GHz	Yes	130 W	1× QPI 4.8 GT/s	3× DDR3-1066	8 MB	2009-05-31	$562
Bloomfield	Enthusiast; Desktop	4 (8)	LGA; 1366	Core i7	940	2.93 GHz	Yes	130 W	1× QPI 4.8 GT/s	3× DDR3-1066	8 MB	2008-11-17	$562
Bloomfield	Enthusiast; Desktop	4 (8)	LGA; 1366	Core i7	930	2.8 GHz	Yes	130 W	1× QPI 4.8 GT/s	3× DDR3-1066	8 MB	2010-02-28	$294
Bloomfield	Enthusiast; Desktop	4 (8)	LGA; 1366	Core i7	920	2.66 GHz	Yes	130 W	1× QPI 4.8 GT/s	3× DDR3-1066	8 MB	2008-11-17	$284
Lynnfield	Performance; Desktop	4 (8)	LGA; 1156	Core i7	880	3.06 GHz	Yes	95 W	DMI	2× DDR3-1333	8 MB	2010-05-30	$583
Lynnfield	Performance; Desktop	4 (8)	LGA; 1156	Core i7	875K	2.93 GHz	Yes	95 W	DMI	2× DDR3-1333	8 MB	2010-05-30	$342
Lynnfield	Performance; Desktop	4 (8)	LGA; 1156	Core i7	870	2.93 GHz	Yes	95 W	DMI	2× DDR3-1333	8 MB	2009-09-08	$562
Lynnfield	Performance; Desktop	4 (8)	LGA; 1156	Core i7	870S	2.66 GHz	Yes	82 W	DMI	2× DDR3-1333	8 MB	2010-07-19	$351
Lynnfield	Performance; Desktop	4 (8)	LGA; 1156	Core i7	860	2.8 GHz	Yes	95 W	DMI	2× DDR3-1333	8 MB	2009-09-08	$284
Lynnfield	Performance; Desktop	4 (8)	LGA; 1156	Core i7	860S	2.53 GHz	Yes	82 W	DMI	2× DDR3-1333	8 MB	2010-01-07	$337
Lynnfield	Performance; Desktop	4 (4)	LGA; 1156	Core i5	760	2.8 GHz	Yes	95 W	DMI	2× DDR3-1333	8 MB	2010-07-17	$209
Lynnfield	Performance; Desktop	4 (4)	LGA; 1156	Core i5	750	2.66 GHz	Yes	95 W	DMI	2× DDR3-1333	8 MB	2009-09-08	$196
Lynnfield	Performance; Desktop	4 (4)	LGA; 1156	Core i5	750S	2.4 GHz	Yes	82 W	DMI	2× DDR3-1333	8 MB	2010-01-07	$259
Jasper Forest	Embedded; Desktop	1 (2)	LGA; 1366	Celeron	P1053	1.33 GHz	No	30 W	DMI	3× DDR3-800	2 MB	2010-12-02	$160

- Intel states the Gainestown processors have six memory channels. Gainestown processors have dual QPI links and have a separate set of memory registers for each link in effect, a multiplexed six-channel system.

=== Mobile processors ===
Codename	Market	Cores / Threads	Socket	Processor Branding & Model		Core Clock rate	Turbo	TDP	L3 cache	Interface	Release date	Price
Clarksfield	Extreme mobile	4 (8)	Socket G1 rPGA 988	Core i7 Extreme	940XM	2.13 GHz	Yes	55 W	8 MB	* DMI * 2x DDR3-1333 * PCIe 1 x16 / 2 x8	2010-06-21	$1096
Clarksfield	Extreme mobile	4 (8)	Socket G1 rPGA 988	Core i7 Extreme	920XM	2.0 GHz	Yes	55 W	8 MB	* DMI * 2x DDR3-1333 * PCIe 1 x16 / 2 x8	2009-09-23	$1054
Clarksfield	Quad-core mobile Performance mobile	4 (8)	Socket G1 rPGA 988	Core i7	840QM	1.86 GHz	Yes	45 W	8 MB	* DMI * 2x DDR3-1333 * PCIe 1 x16 / 2 x8	2010-06-21	$568
Clarksfield	Quad-core mobile Performance mobile	4 (8)	Socket G1 rPGA 988	Core i7	820QM	1.73 GHz	Yes	45 W	8 MB	* DMI * 2x DDR3-1333 * PCIe 1 x16 / 2 x8	2009-09-23	$546
Clarksfield	Quad-core mobile Performance mobile	4 (8)	Socket G1 rPGA 988	Core i7	740QM	1.73 GHz	Yes	45 W	6 MB	* DMI * 2x DDR3-1333 * PCIe 1 x16 / 2 x8	2010-06-21	$378
Clarksfield	Quad-core mobile Performance mobile	4 (8)	Socket G1 rPGA 988	Core i7	720QM	1.6 GHz	Yes	45 W	6 MB	* DMI * 2x DDR3-1333 * PCIe 1 x16 / 2 x8	2009-09-23	$364

== See also ==
- List of Intel CPU microarchitectures
- Tick–tock model

Atom (ULV)		Node name	Pentium/Core						
Microarch.	Step	Node name	Microarch.	Step					
		600 nm	P6	Pentium Pro (133 MHz)					
		500 nm	P6	Pentium Pro (150 MHz)					
		350 nm	P6	Pentium Pro (166–200 MHz)					
		350 nm	P6	Klamath					
		250 nm	P6	Deschutes					
		250 nm	P6	Katmai	NetBurst				
		180 nm	P6	Coppermine	Willamette				
		130 nm	P6	Tualatin	Northwood				
		130 nm	Pentium M (P6)	Banias	Northwood		NetBurst(HT)		NetBurst(×2)
		90 nm	Pentium M (P6)	Dothan	Prescott	⇨	Prescott‑2M	⇨	Smithfield
		90 nm	Pentium M (P6)	Dothan	~~Tejas~~	→	⇩	→	~~Cedarmill (Tejas)~~
		65 nm	Pentium M (P6)	Yonah	~~Nehalem (NetBurst)~~		Cedar Mill	⇨	Presler
		65 nm	Core	Merom	4 cores on mainstream desktop, DDR3 introduced				
Bonnell	Bonnell	45 nm	Core	Penryn					
Bonnell	Bonnell	45 nm	Nehalem	Nehalem	HT reintroduced, integrated MC, PCH; L3-cache introduced, 256 KB L2-cache/core				
Bonnell	Saltwell	32 nm	Nehalem	Westmere	Introduced GPU on same package and AES-NI				
Bonnell	Saltwell	32 nm	Sandy Bridge	Sandy Bridge	On-die ring bus, no more non-UEFI motherboards				
Silvermont	Silvermont	22 nm	Sandy Bridge	Ivy Bridge					
Silvermont	Silvermont	22 nm	Haswell	Haswell	Fully integrated voltage regulator				
Silvermont	Airmont	14 nm	Haswell	Broadwell					
Silvermont	Airmont	14 nm	Skylake	Skylake	DDR4 introduced on mainstream desktop				
Goldmont		14 nm	Skylake	Kaby Lake					
Goldmont		14 nm	Skylake	Coffee Lake	6 cores on mainstream desktop				
Goldmont		14 nm	Skylake	Amber Lake	Mobile-only				
Goldmont Plus		14 nm	Skylake	Whiskey Lake	Mobile-only				
Goldmont Plus		14 nm	Skylake	Coffee Lake Refresh	8 cores on mainstream desktop				
Goldmont Plus		14 nm	Skylake	Comet Lake	10 cores on mainstream desktop				
Goldmont Plus		14 nm	Sunny Cove	Cypress Cove (Rocket Lake)	Backported Sunny Cove microarchitecture for 14 nm				
Tremont		10 nm	Skylake	Palm Cove (Cannon Lake)	Mobile-only				
Tremont		10 nm	Sunny Cove	Sunny Cove (Ice Lake)	512 KB L2-cache/core				
Tremont		10 nm	Sunny Cove	Willow Cove (Tiger Lake)	X^{e} graphics engine				
Gracemont		Intel 7 (10 nm ESF)	Golden Cove	Golden Cove (Alder Lake)	Hybrid, DDR5, PCIe 5.0				
Gracemont		Intel 7 (10 nm ESF)	Golden Cove	Raptor Cove (Raptor Lake)					
Crestmont		Intel 4	Redwood Cove	Meteor Lake	Mobile-only; NPU, chiplet architecture				
Crestmont		Intel 3	Redwood Cove	Arrow Lake-U					
Skymont		TSMC N3B	Lion Cove	Lunar Lake	Low power mobile only (9–30 W)				
Skymont		TSMC N3B	Lion Cove	Arrow Lake					
Darkmont		Intel 18A	Cougar Cove	Panther Lake					
Arctic Wolf		Intel 18A and/or TSMC N2P	Coyote Cove	Nova Lake					
