= Intel P35 =

Desktop computer chipset

Intel P35 Express
- Codename: Bearlake
- CPU supported: Core 2 (Quad, Duo, Extreme); Dual-Core Pentium; Celeron (Core architecture)
- Socket supported: LGA 775
- Fabrication process: 90 nm
- TDP: 16 W
- Southbridge: ICH9 or ICH9R

Miscellaneous
- Release date: June 2007
- Predecessor: P965
- Successor: P45 (Eaglelake)

The P35 Express (codenamed Bearlake) is a mainstream desktop computer chipset from Intel released in June 2007; motherboards featuring the chipset were available a month earlier. The P35 Express chipset supports Intel's LGA 775 socket and Core 2 Duo and Quad processors, and is also known to support 45 nm Wolfdale/Yorkfield dual and quad core CPUs. Theoretically, Intel also dropped support for Intel's Pentium 4 and Pentium D processors with this chipset although late Pentium 4 processors, including both the 32-bit-only (5x0) and the 32-bit/64-bit (5x1), and a few others, were fully supported.

It is notable for providing the first commodity support of DDR3 SDRAM. It also supports DDR2 SDRAM; the choice is made by the motherboard manufacturer, and some manufacturers supported both DDR3 and DDR2 on the same motherboard, but only one memory type at a time, often 4× DDR2 or 2× DDR3, as in the Gigabyte GA-EP35C-DS3L/R; but DDR3-only models, such as the Gigabyte GA-EP35T-DS3L/R and the DDR2-only models, such as the Gigabyte GA-EP35-DS3L/R were also made, concurrently. Another notable point is that it does not provide Parallel ATA support; most 2007 motherboards added PATA support via a JMicron JMB361 or JMB363 chip.

== See also ==
- List of Intel chipsets
