= Flexible Display Interface =

FDI or Flexible Display Interface is an interconnect created by Intel in order to allow the communication of the HD Graphics integrated GPU found on supported CPUs with the PCH southbridge where display connectors are attached. It provides a path between an Intel processor and an Intel southbridge on a computer motherboard which carries display data from the graphics controller (North Display) of the Intel processor package to the display connectors attached at some PCH (South Display) versions. It is based on DisplayPort standard. Currently it supports 2 independent 4-bit fixed frequency links/channels/pipes at 2.7 Gbit/s data rate. It was first used with the 2010 Core i3, i5 processors and H55, H57, Q57, 3450 southbridges released in 2010. FDI enabled processors require FDI enabled southbridge in order to utilize the graphics controller capability, thus boards based on P55, PM55, and P67 will not be able to take advantage of the graphics controller present on later processors. An FDI capable southbridge and CPU pair is not usable without the existence of the appropriate video connectors on the mainboard.

For a list of Intel chipsets which support FDI, see List of Intel chipsets, 5/6/7/8 Series chipsets.

For a list of Intel CPUs which support FDI, see Westmere (microarchitecture), Sandy Bridge (microarchitecture), Ivy Bridge (microarchitecture), Haswell (microarchitecture). Most of them are also listed on Comparison of Intel graphics processing units, see sections on generations 5, 6, 7, 8.
