= Intel Ivy Bridge–based Xeon microprocessors =

Intel microprocessors

Ivy Bridge-E
General information
- Launched: September 10, 2013
- Designed by: Intel Corporation
- CPUID code: 0306Exh
- Product code: 80633, 80636, 80634, 80635

Performance
- Max. CPU clock rate: to 3.7 GHz
- DMI speeds: 5.00 GT/s

Physical specifications
- Transistors: up to 4.3B 22 nm (S1)
- Cores: up to 15 (physical) up to 30 (logical)
- Socket: LGA 2011, LGA 1356, LGA 2011-1

Cache
- L1 cache: 32 KB per core
- L2 cache: 256 KB per core
- L3 cache: up to 37.5 MB shared

Architecture and classification
- Application: servers, workstations, high-end desktops
- Technology node: 22 nm
- Microarchitecture: Ivy Bridge

History
- Predecessor: Sandy Bridge-E
- Successor: Haswell-E

Intel Ivy Bridge–based Xeon microprocessors (also known as Ivy Bridge-E) is the follow-up to Sandy Bridge-E, using the same CPU core as the Ivy Bridge processor, but in LGA 2011, LGA 1356 and LGA 2011-1 packages for workstations and servers.

There are five different families of Xeon processors that were based on the Ivy Bridge architecture:

- Ivy Bridge-E uses LGA 2011 socket and was branded as Core i7 Extreme Edition and Core i7 high-end desktop (HEDT) processors, despite sharing many similarities with Xeon E5 models.
- Ivy Bridge-EP which also uses LGA 2011 socket for the Xeon E5 models aimed at high-end servers and workstations. It supports up to 4 socket motherboards.
- Ivy Bridge-EX introduces new LGA 2011-1 socket and features up to 15 cores. It supports up to eight socket motherboards.
- Ivy Bridge-EN uses a smaller LGA 1356 socket for low-end and dual-processor servers on certain Xeon E5 and Pentium branded models.
- Ivy Bridge Xeon with LGA 1155 socket were mostly identical to its desktop counterparts apart from the missing IGPU despite branded as Xeon processors.
- Gladden was offered in BGA 1284 package for embedded applications.

== Features ==
- Dual memory controllers for Ivy Bridge-EP and Ivy Bridge-EX
- Up to 12 CPU cores and 30 MB of L3 cache for Ivy Bridge-EP
- Up to 15 CPU cores and 37.5 MB L3 cache for Ivy Bridge-EX (released on February 18, 2014 as Xeon E7 v2)
- Thermal design power between 50 W and 155 W
- Support for up to eight DIMMs of DDR3-1866 memory per socket, with reductions in memory speed depending on the number of DIMMs per channel
- No integrated GPU
- Ivy Bridge-EP introduced new hardware support for interrupt virtualization, branded as APICv.

== Models and steppings ==
The basic Ivy Bridge-E is a single-socket processor sold as Core i7-49xx and is only available in the six-core S1 stepping, with some versions limited to four active cores.

There are in fact three die "flavors" for the Ivy Bridge-EP, meaning that they are manufactured and organized differently, according to the number of cores an Ivy Bridge-EP CPU includes:

- The largest is an up-to-12-core die organized as three four-core columns with up to 30 MB L3 cache in two banks between the cores; these cores are linked by three rings of interconnects.
- The intermediate is an up-to-10-core die organized as two five-core columns with up to 25 MB L3 cache in a single bank between the cores; the cores are linked by two rings of interconnects.
- The smallest is an up-to-six-core die organized as two three-core columns with up to 15 MB L3 cache in a single bank between the cores; the cores are linked by two rings of interconnects.

Ivy Bridge-EX has up to 15 cores and scales to 8 sockets. The 15-core die is organized into three columns of five cores, with three interconnect rings connecting two columns per ring; each five-core column has a separate L3 cache.

Die code name	CPUID	Stepping	Die size	Transistors	Cores	L3 cache	Socket
Ivy Bridge-E-6	0x0306Ex	S1	256.5 mm^{2}	1.86 billion	6	15 MB	LGA 2011
Ivy Bridge-EN-6	0x0306Ex	S1	256.5 mm^{2}	1.86 billion	6	15 MB	LGA 1356
Ivy Bridge-EP-6	0x0306Ex	S1	256.5 mm^{2}	1.86 billion	6	15 MB	LGA 2011
Ivy Bridge-EX-6	0x0306Ex	D1	256.5 mm^{2}	1.86 billion	6	15 MB	LGA 2011-1
Ivy Bridge-EN-10	0x0306Ex	M1	341 mm^{2}	2.89 billion	10	25 MB	LGA 1356
Ivy Bridge-EP-10	0x0306Ex	M1	341 mm^{2}	2.89 billion	10	25 MB	LGA 2011
Ivy Bridge-EX-10	0x0306Ex	D1	341 mm^{2}	2.89 billion	10	25 MB	LGA 2011-1
Ivy Bridge-EP-12	0x0306Ex	C1	541 mm^{2}	4.31 billion	12	30 MB	LGA 2011
Ivy Bridge-EX-15	0x0306Ex	D1	541 mm^{2}	4.31 billion	15	37.5 MB	LGA 2011-1

== Ivy Bridge-E and Ivy Bridge-EP ==
- All models support: MMX, SSE, SSE2, SSE3, SSSE3, SSE4.1, SSE4.2, AVX, F16C, Enhanced Intel SpeedStep Technology (EIST), Intel 64, XD bit (an NX bit implementation), TXT, Intel VT-x, Intel EPT, Intel VT-d, Intel VT-c, Intel x8 SDDC, Hyper-threading (except E5-1607 v2, E5-2603 v2, E5-2609 v2 and E5-4627 v2), Turbo Boost (except E5-1607 v2, E5-2603 v2, E5-2609 v2, E5-2618L v2, E5-4603 v2 and E5-4607 v2), AES-NI, Smart Cache.
- Support for up to 12 DIMMs of DDR3 memory per CPU socket.

Processors with Quad Socket Support
Model	Cores (threads)	CPU clock rate		L3 Cache	TDP	Interface	Supported memory	Release date	Price (USD)
Model	Cores (threads)	Base	Turbo	L3 Cache	TDP	Interface	Supported memory	Release date	Price (USD)
4657L v2	12 (24)	2.4 GHz	2.9 GHz	30 MB	115W	2× 8.0 GT/s QPI	4× DDR3-1866	March 3, 2014	$4394
4650 v2	10 (20)	2.4 GHz	2.9 GHz	25 MB	95W	2× 8.0 GT/s QPI	4× DDR3-1866	March 3, 2014	$3616
4640 v2	10 (20)	2.2GHz	2.7 GHz	20 MB	95W	2× 8.0 GT/s QPI	4× DDR3-1866	March 3, 2014	$2725
4624L v2	10 (20)	1.9 GHz	2.5 GHz	25 MB	70W	2× 8.0 GT/s QPI	4× DDR3-1866	March 3, 2014	$2405
4627 v2	8 (8)	3.3GHz	3.6 GHz	16 MB	130W	2× 7.2 GT/s QPI	4× DDR3-1866	March 3, 2014	$2108
4620 v2	8 (16)	2.6 GHz	3.0 GHz	20 MB	95W	2× 7.2 GT/s QPI	4× DDR3-1600	March 3, 2014	$1611
4610 v2	8 (16)	2.3GHz	2.7 GHz	16 MB	95W	2× 7.2 GT/s QPI	4× DDR3-1600	March 3, 2014	$1219
4607 v2	6 (12)	2.6 GHz	N/A	15 MB	95W	2× 6.4 GT/s QPI	4× DDR3-1333	March 3, 2014	$885
4603 v2	4 (8)	2.2GHz	N/A	10 MB	95W	2× 6.4 GT/s QPI	4× DDR3-1333	March 3, 2014	$551

Processors with Dual Socket Support
Model		Cores (threads)	CPU clock rate		L3 Cache	TDP	Interface	Supported memory	Release date	Price (USD)
Model		Cores (threads)	Base	Turbo	L3 Cache	TDP	Interface	Supported memory	Release date	Price (USD)
Xeon E5	2697 v2	12 (24)	2.7GHz	3.5 GHz	30MB	130W	2× 8.0 GT/s QPI	4× DDR3-1866	Sep 10, 2013	$2614
Xeon E5	2696 v2	12 (24)	2.5GHz	3.5 GHz	30MB	120W	2× 8.0 GT/s QPI	4× DDR3-1866	Sep 10, 2013	OEM
Xeon E5	2695 v2	12 (24)	2.4 GHz	3.2 GHz	30MB	115W	2× 8.0 GT/s QPI	4× DDR3-1866	Sep 10, 2013	$2336
Xeon E5	2692 v2	12 (24)	2.2GHz	3.0 GHz	30MB	115W	2× 8.0 GT/s QPI	4× DDR3-1866	June 2013	Tianhe-2 OEM
Xeon E5	2651 v2	12 (24)	1.8 GHz	2.2 GHz	30MB	105W	2× 6.4 GT/s QPI	4× DDR3-1600	Sep 10, 2013	OEM
Xeon E5	2690 v2	10 (20)	3.0 GHz	3.6 GHz	25MB	130W	2× 8.0 GT/s QPI	4× DDR3-1866	Sep 10, 2013	$2057
Xeon E5	2680 v2	10 (20)	2.8GHz	3.6 GHz	25MB	115W	2× 8.0 GT/s QPI	4× DDR3-1866	Sep 10, 2013	$1723
Xeon E5	2670 v2	10 (20)	2.5 GHz	3.3 GHz	25MB	115W	2× 8.0 GT/s QPI	4× DDR3-1866	Sep 10, 2013	$1552
Xeon E5	2660 v2	10 (20)	2.2GHz	3.0 GHz	25MB	95W	2× 8.0 GT/s QPI	4× DDR3-1866	Sep 10, 2013	$1389
Xeon E5	2658 v2	10 (20)	2.4 GHz	3.0 GHz	25MB	95W	2× 8.0 GT/s QPI	4× DDR3-1866	Sep 10, 2013	$1750
Xeon E5	2648L v2	10 (20)	1.9 GHz	2.5 GHz	25MB	70W	2× 8.0 GT/s QPI	4× DDR3-1866	Sep 10, 2013	$1479
Xeon E5	2650L v2	10 (20)	1.7GHz	2.1 GHz	25MB	70W	2× 7.2 GT/s QPI	4× DDR3-1600	Sep 10, 2013	$1219
Xeon E5	2687W v2	8 (16)	3.4GHz	4.0 GHz	25MB	150W	2× 8.0 GT/s QPI	4× DDR3-1866	Sep 10, 2013	$2108
Xeon E5	2673 v2	8 (16)	3.3GHz	4.0 GHz	25MB	110W	2× 8.0 GT/s QPI	4× DDR3-1866	Dec 2013	OEM
Xeon E5	2667 v2	8 (16)	3.3GHz	4.0 GHz	25MB	130W	2× 8.0 GT/s QPI	4× DDR3-1866	Sep 10, 2013	$2057
Xeon E5	2650 v2	8 (16)	2.6 GHz	3.4 GHz	20MB	95W	2× 8.0 GT/s QPI	4× DDR3-1866	Sep 10, 2013	$1166
Xeon E5	2640 v2	8 (16)	2.0 GHz	2.5 GHz	20MB	95W	2× 7.2 GT/s QPI	4× DDR3-1600	Sep 10, 2013	$885
Xeon E5	2628L v2	8 (16)	1.9 GHz	2.6 GHz	20MB	70W	2× 7.2 GT/s QPI	4× DDR3-1600	Sep 10, 2013	$1216
Xeon E5	2643 v2	6 (12)	3.5 GHz	3.8 GHz	25MB	130W	2× 8.0 GT/s QPI	4× DDR3-1866	Sep 10, 2013	$1552
Xeon E5	2630 v2	6 (12)	2.6GHz	3.1 GHz	15MB	80W	2× 7.2 GT/s QPI	4× DDR3-1600	Sep 10, 2013	$612
Xeon E5	2620 v2	6 (12)	2.1 GHz	2.6 GHz	15MB	80W	2× 7.2 GT/s QPI	4× DDR3-1600	Sep 10, 2013	$406
Xeon E5	2630L v2	6 (12)	2.4 GHz	2.8 GHz	15MB	60W	2× 7.2 GT/s QPI	4× DDR3-1600	Sep 10, 2013	$612
Xeon E5	2618L v2	6 (12)	2.0 GHz	N/A	15MB	50W	2× 6.4 GT/s QPI	4× DDR3-1333	Sep 10, 2013	$520
Xeon E5	2637 v2	4 (8)	3.5 GHz	3.8 GHz	15MB	130W	2× 8.0 GT/s QPI	4× DDR3-1866	Sep 10, 2013	$996
Xeon E5	2609 v2	4 (4)	2.5 GHz	N/A	10MB	80W	2× 6.4 GT/s QPI	4× DDR3-1333	Sep 10, 2013	$294
Xeon E5	2603 v2	4 (4)	1.8 GHz	N/A	10MB	80W	2× 6.4 GT/s QPI	4× DDR3-1333	Sep 10, 2013	$202

Single Socket Processors
Model		Cores (threads)	CPU clock rate		L3 Cache	TDP	Interface	Supported memory	Release date	Price (USD)
Model		Cores (threads)	Base	Turbo	L3 Cache	TDP	Interface	Supported memory	Release date	Price (USD)
Xeon E5	1680 v2	8 (16)	3.0 GHz	3.9 GHz	25MB	130W	DMI 2.0 PCIe 3.0	4× DDR3-1866	Sept 10, 2013	$1723
Xeon E5	1660 v2	6 (12)	3.7 GHz	4.0 GHz	15MB	130W	DMI 2.0 PCIe 3.0	4× DDR3-1866	Sept 10, 2013	$1080
Xeon E5	1650 v2	6 (12)	3.5 GHz	3.9 GHz	12MB	130W	DMI 2.0 PCIe 3.0	4× DDR3-1866	Sept 10, 2013	$583
Xeon E5	1620 v2	4 (8)	3.7 GHz	3.9 GHz	10MB	130W	DMI 2.0 PCIe 3.0	4× DDR3-1866	Sept 10, 2013	$294
Xeon E5	1607 v2	4 (8)	3.0 GHz	N/A	10MB	130W	DMI 2.0 PCIe 3.0	4× DDR3-1600	Sept 10, 2013	$244
Core i7Extreme	4960X	6 (12)	3.6 GHz	4.0 GHz	15MB	130W	DMI 2.0 PCIe 3.0	4× DDR3-1866	Sept 10, 2013	$999
Core i7	4930K	6 (12)	3.4 GHz	3.9 GHz	12MB	130W	DMI 2.0 PCIe 3.0	4× DDR3-1866	Sept 10, 2013	$583
Core i7	4820K	4 (8)	3.7 GHz	3.9 GHz	10MB	130W	DMI 2.0 PCIe 3.0	4× DDR3-1866	Sept 10, 2013	$323

== Ivy Bridge EX ==
- All models support: MMX, SSE, SSE2, SSE3, SSSE3, SSE4.1, SSE4.2, AVX, F16C, Enhanced Intel SpeedStep Technology (EIST), Intel 64, XD bit (an NX bit implementation), TXT, Intel VT-x, Intel EPT, Intel VT-d, Intel VT-c, Intel x8 SDDC, Hyper-threading (except E7-8857 v2), Turbo Boost (except E7-4809 v2), AES-NI, Smart Cache.
- Support for up to 24 DIMMs of DDR3 memory per CPU socket.

== Ivy Bridge EN ==
- All models support: MMX, SSE, SSE2, SSE3, SSSE3, SSE4.1, SSE4.2, AVX, F16C, Enhanced Intel SpeedStep Technology (EIST), Intel 64, XD bit (an NX bit implementation), TXT, Intel VT-x, Intel EPT, Intel VT-d, Intel VT-c, Intel x8 SDDC, Hyper-threading (except E5-2403 v2 and E5-2407 v2), Turbo Boost (except E5-2403 v2, E5-2407 v2 and E5-2418L v2), AES-NI, Smart Cache.
- Support for up to six DIMMs of DDR3 memory per CPU socket.

== Ivy Bridge Xeon ==
- All models support: MMX, SSE, SSE2, SSE3, SSSE3, SSE4.1, SSE4.2, AVX, F16C, Enhanced Intel SpeedStep Technology (EIST), Intel 64, XD bit (an NX bit implementation), TXT, Intel VT-x, Intel EPT, Intel VT-d, Hyper-threading (except E3-1220 v2 and E3-1225 v2), Turbo Boost, AES-NI, Smart Cache, ECC
- Transistors: E1: 1.4 billion
- Die size: E1: 160 mm²
- All models support uni-processor configurations only.
- Intel HD Graphics P4000 uses drivers that are optimized and certified for professional applications, similar to nVidia Quadro and AMD FirePro products.

== Gladden ==
- All models support: MMX, Streaming SIMD Extensions (SSE), SSE2, SSE3, SSSE3, SSE4.1, SSE4.2, Advanced Vector Extensions (AVX), Enhanced Intel SpeedStep Technology (EIST), Intel 64, XD bit (an NX bit implementation), Trusted Execution Technology (TXT), Intel VT-x, Intel EPT, Intel VT-d, Hyper-threading, AES-NI.
- All models support uni-processor configurations only.
- Die size:160 mm²
- Steppings: E1
