= LGA 13xx =

LGA 13xx may refer to:

- LGA 1366 (Socket B)
- LGA 1356 (Socket B2)
