= LGA 20xx =

LGA 20xx may refer to:

- LGA 2011 (Socket R)
- LGA 2011-1 (Socket R2)
- LGA 2011-v3 (Socket R3)
- LGA 2066 (Socket R4)
