= Intel Sandy Bridge-based Xeon microprocessors =

Intel processor family

Sandy Bridge-E
General information
- Launched: Q4 2011
- Designed by: Intel Corporation
- CPUID code: 0206Dxh
- Product code: 80619, 80620, 80621, 80622
- Max. CPU clock rate: to 3.6 GHz

Physical specifications
- Cores: up to 8 (physical) up to 16 (logical)
- Socket: LGA 2011, LGA 1356, LGA 1155, BGA 1284

Cache
- L2 cache: 256 kB per core
- L3 cache: up to 20 MB

Architecture and classification
- Application: servers, workstations, high-end desktops
- Technology node: 32 nanometer
- Microarchitecture: Sandy Bridge

History
- Predecessor: Gulftown
- Successor: Ivy Bridge-E

Intel Sandy Bridge-based Xeon microprocessors (often referred to as Sandy Bridge-E) are microprocessors based on the Intel's 32 nm Sandy Bridge architecture for servers, workstations, and high-end desktops. It succeeds the six-core Gulftown/Westmere-EP processor which used the older LGA 1366 package, and uses LGA 2011, LGA 1356 and LGA 1155 socket depending on the package.

== Overview ==
There are five different families of Xeon processors that were based on Sandy Bridge architecture:

- Sandy Bridge-E (LGA 2011) targeted high-end desktop (HEDT) enthusiast segment. It was branded as Core i7 Extreme Edition and Core i7 processors, despite sharing many similarities with Xeon models.
- Sandy Bridge-EP (LGA 2011) branded as Xeon E5 models aimed at high-end servers and workstations. It supported motherboards equipped with up to 4 sockets.
- Sandy Bridge-EN (LGA 1356) uses a smaller socket for low-end and dual-processor servers on certain Xeon E5 and Pentium branded models.
- Sandy Bridge Xeon (LGA 1155) were mostly identical to its desktop counterparts apart from the missing IGPU despite branded as Xeon E3 processors.
- Gladden (BGA 1284) Xeon E3 models were for embedded applications.

IGPU is absent on most of these processors unless noted otherwise.

== Sandy Bridge-E and Sandy Bridge-EP ==
All models support: MMX, SSE, SSE2, SSE3, SSSE3, SSE4.1, SSE4.2, AVX, Enhanced Intel SpeedStep Technology (EIST), Intel 64, XD bit (an NX bit implementation), TXT, Intel VT-x, Intel EPT, Intel VT-d, Intel VT-c, Intel x8 SDDC, Hyper-threading (except E5-1603, E5-1607, E5-2603, E5-2609 and E5-4617), Turbo Boost (except E5-1603, E5-1607, E5-2603, E5-2609, E5-4603 and E5-4607), AES-NI, Smart Cache.

Processors with Quad Socket Support
Socket	Model		Cores (threads)	L3 Cache	CPU clock rate		Interface	Supported memory	TDP	Release date	Price (USD)
Socket	Model		Cores (threads)	L3 Cache	Base	Turbo	Interface	Supported memory	TDP	Release date	Price (USD)
LGA 2011 Quad Socket	Xeon E5	4650	8 (16)	20MB	2.7 GHz	3.3 GHz	2× 8.0GT/s QPI DMI 2.0 40× PCIe 3.0	4× DDR3-1600	130W	May 14, 2012	$3616
LGA 2011 Quad Socket	Xeon E5	4650L	8 (16)	20MB	2.6 GHz	3.1 GHz	2× 8.0GT/s QPI DMI 2.0 40× PCIe 3.0	4× DDR3-1600	115W	May 14, 2012	$3616
LGA 2011 Quad Socket	Xeon E5	4640	8 (16)	20MB	2.4 GHz	2.8 GHz	2× 8.0GT/s QPI DMI 2.0 40× PCIe 3.0	4× DDR3-1600	95W	May 14, 2012	$2725
LGA 2011 Quad Socket	Xeon E5	4620	8 (16)	16MB	2.2 GHz	2.6 GHz	2× 7.2GT/s QPI	4× DDR3-1333	95W	May 14, 2012	$1611
LGA 2011 Quad Socket	Xeon E5	4617	6 (6)	15MB	2.9 GHz	3.4 GHz	2× 7.2GT/s QPI	4× DDR3-1600	130W	May 14, 2012	$1611
LGA 2011 Quad Socket	Xeon E5	4610	6 (12)	15MB	2.4 GHz	2.9 GHz	2× 7.2GT/s QPI	4× DDR3-1333	95W	May 14, 2012	$1219
LGA 2011 Quad Socket	Xeon E5	4607	6 (12)	12MB	2.2 GHz	N/A	2× 6.0GT/s QPI	4× DDR3-1066	95W	May 14, 2012	$885
LGA 2011 Quad Socket	Xeon E5	4603	4 (8)	10MB	2.0 GHz	N/A	2× 6.0GT/s QPI	4× DDR3-1066	95W	May 14, 2012	$551

Processors with Dual Socket Support
Socket	Model		Cores (threads)	L3 Cache	CPU clock rate		Interface	Supported memory	TDP	Release date	Price (USD)
Socket	Model		Cores (threads)	L3 Cache	Base	Turbo	Interface	Supported memory	TDP	Release date	Price (USD)
LGA 2011 Dual Socket	Xeon E5	2687W	8 (16)	20MB	3.1 GHz	3.8 GHz	2× 8.0GT/s QPI (DMI 2.0 40× PCIe 3.0)	4× DDR3-1600	150W	March 6, 2012	$1885
LGA 2011 Dual Socket	Xeon E5	2690	8 (16)	20MB	2.9 GHz	3.8 GHz	2× 8.0GT/s QPI (DMI 2.0 40× PCIe 3.0)	4× DDR3-1600	135W	March 6, 2012	$2057
LGA 2011 Dual Socket	Xeon E5	2680	8 (16)	20MB	2.7 GHz	3.5 GHz	2× 8.0GT/s QPI (DMI 2.0 40× PCIe 3.0)	4× DDR3-1600	130W	March 6, 2012	$1723
LGA 2011 Dual Socket	Xeon E5	2689	8 (16)	20MB	2.6 GHz	3.6 GHz	2× 8.0GT/s QPI (DMI 2.0 40× PCIe 3.0)	4× DDR3-1600	115W	March 6, 2012	OEM
LGA 2011 Dual Socket	Xeon E5	2670	8 (16)	20MB	2.6 GHz	3.3 GHz	2× 8.0GT/s QPI (DMI 2.0 40× PCIe 3.0)	4× DDR3-1600	115W	March 6, 2012	$1552
LGA 2011 Dual Socket	Xeon E5	2665	8 (16)	20MB	2.4 GHz	3.1 GHz	2× 8.0GT/s QPI (DMI 2.0 40× PCIe 3.0)	4× DDR3-1600	115W	March 6, 2012	$1440
LGA 2011 Dual Socket	Xeon E5	2660	8 (16)	20MB	2.2 GHz	3.0 GHz	2× 8.0GT/s QPI (DMI 2.0 40× PCIe 3.0)	4× DDR3-1600	95W	March 6, 2012	$1329
LGA 2011 Dual Socket	Xeon E5	2658	8 (16)	20MB	2.1 GHz	2.4 GHz	2× 8.0GT/s QPI (DMI 2.0 40× PCIe 3.0)	4× DDR3-1600	95W	March 6, 2012	$1186
LGA 2011 Dual Socket	Xeon E5	2650	8 (16)	20MB	2.0 GHz	2.8 GHz	2× 8.0GT/s QPI (DMI 2.0 40× PCIe 3.0)	4× DDR3-1600	95W	March 6, 2012	$1107
LGA 2011 Dual Socket	Xeon E5	2650L	8 (16)	20MB	1.8 GHz	2.3 GHz	2× 8.0GT/s QPI (DMI 2.0 40× PCIe 3.0)	4× DDR3-1600	70W	March 6, 2012	$1107
LGA 2011 Dual Socket	Xeon E5	2648L	8 (16)	20MB	1.8 GHz	2.1 GHz	2× 8.0GT/s QPI (DMI 2.0 40× PCIe 3.0)	4× DDR3-1600	70W	March 6, 2012	$1186
LGA 2011 Dual Socket	Xeon E5	2667	6 (12)	15MB	2.9 GHz	3.5 GHz	2× 8.0GT/s QPI (DMI 2.0 40× PCIe 3.0)	4× DDR3-1600	130W	March 6, 2012	$1552
LGA 2011 Dual Socket	Xeon E5	2640	6 (12)	15MB	2.5 GHz	3.0 GHz	2× 7.2GT/s QPI	4× DDR3-1333	95W	March 6, 2012	$884
LGA 2011 Dual Socket	Xeon E5	2630	6 (12)	15MB	2.3 GHz	2.8 GHz	2× 7.2GT/s QPI	4× DDR3-1333	95W	March 6, 2012	$612
LGA 2011 Dual Socket	Xeon E5	2620	6 (12)	15MB	2.0 GHz	2.5 GHz	2× 7.2GT/s QPI	4× DDR3-1333	95W	March 6, 2012	$406
LGA 2011 Dual Socket	Xeon E5	2630L	6 (12)	15MB	2.0 GHz	2.5 GHz	2× 7.2GT/s QPI	4× DDR3-1333	60W	March 6, 2012	$662
LGA 2011 Dual Socket	Xeon E5	2628L	6 (12)	15MB	1.8 GHz	N/A	2× 7.2GT/s QPI	4× DDR3-1333	60W	July 22, 2013	OEM
LGA 2011 Dual Socket	Xeon E5	2643	4 (8)	10MB	3.3 GHz	3.5 GHz	2× 8.0GT/s QPI	4× DDR3-1600	130W	March 6, 2012	$884
LGA 2011 Dual Socket	Xeon E5	2637	2 (4)	5MB	3.0 GHz	3.5 GHz	2× 8.0GT/s QPI	4× DDR3-1600	80W	March 6, 2012	$884
LGA 2011 Dual Socket	Xeon E5	2618L	4 (8)	10MB	1.8 GHz	N/A	2× 6.4GT/s QPI	4× DDR3-1333	50W	July 22, 2013	OEM
LGA 2011 Dual Socket	Xeon E5	2609	4 (4)	10MB	2.4 GHz	N/A	2× 6.4GT/s QPI	4× DDR3-1066	80W	March 6, 2012	$246
LGA 2011 Dual Socket	Xeon E5	2603	4 (4)	10MB	1.8 GHz	N/A	2× 6.4GT/s QPI	4× DDR3-1066	80W	March 6, 2012	$202

Single Socket Processors
Socket	Model		Cores (threads)	L3 Cache	CPU clock rate		Interface	Supported memory	TDP	Release date	Price (USD)
Socket	Model		Cores (threads)	L3 Cache	Base	Turbo	Interface	Supported memory	TDP	Release date	Price (USD)
LGA 2011	Xeon E5	1660	6 (12)	15MB	3.3 GHz	3.9 GHz	DMI 2.0 40× PCIe 2.0	4× DDR3-1600	130W	March 6, 2012	$1080
LGA 2011	Xeon E5	1650	6 (12)	12MB	3.2 GHz	3.8 GHz	DMI 2.0 40× PCIe 2.0	4× DDR3-1600	130W	March 6, 2012	$583
LGA 2011	Xeon E5	1620	4 (8)	10MB	3.6 GHz	3.8 GHz	DMI 2.0 40× PCIe 2.0	4× DDR3-1600	130W	March 6, 2012	$294
LGA 2011	Xeon E5	1607	4 (4)	10MB	3.0 GHz	N/A	DMI 2.0 40× PCIe 2.0	4× DDR3-1066	130W	March 6, 2012	$244
LGA 2011	Xeon E5	1603	4 (4)	10MB	2.8 GHz	N/A	DMI 2.0 40× PCIe 2.0	4× DDR3-1066	130W	March 6, 2012	$198
LGA 2011	Core i7 Extreme Edition	3970X	6 (12)	15MB	3.5 GHz	4.0 GHz	DMI 2.0 40× PCIe 2.0	4× DDR3-1600	150W	Nov 12, 2012	$999
LGA 2011	Core i7 Extreme Edition	3960X	6 (12)	15MB	3.3 GHz	3.9 GHz	DMI 2.0 40× PCIe 2.0	4× DDR3-1600	130W	Nov 14, 2011	$999
LGA 2011	Core i7	3930K	6 (12)	12MB	3.2 GHz	3.8 GHz	DMI 2.0 40× PCIe 2.0	4× DDR3-1600	130W	Nov 14, 2011	$583
LGA 2011	Core i7	3820	4 (8)	10MB	3.6 GHz	3.8 GHz	DMI 2.0 40× PCIe 2.0	4× DDR3-1600	130W	Feb 13, 2012	$294

== Sandy Bridge-EN ==
- All models support: MMX, SSE, SSE2, SSE3, SSSE3, SSE4.1, SSE4.2, AVX, Enhanced Intel SpeedStep Technology (EIST), Intel 64, XD bit (an NX bit implementation), TXT, Intel VT-x, Intel EPT, Intel VT-d, Intel VT-c, Intel x8 SDDC, Hyper-threading (except E5-2403 and E5-2407), Turbo Boost (except E5-1428L, E5-2403 and E5-2407), AES-NI, Smart Cache.

Socket	Model		Cores (threads)	L3Cache	CPU clock rate		Interface	Supported memory	TDP	Release date	Price (USD)
Socket	Model		Cores (threads)	L3Cache	Standard	Turbo	Interface	Supported memory	TDP	Release date	Price (USD)
LGA 1356 Dual Socket	Xeon E5	2470	8 (16)	20MB	2.3 GHz	3.1 GHz	1× 8.0GT/s QPI (DMI 2.0 24× PCI-E 3.0)	3× DDR3-1600	95W	May 14, 2012	$1440
LGA 1356 Dual Socket	Xeon E5	2450	8 (16)	20MB	2.1 GHz	2.9 GHz	1× 8.0GT/s QPI (DMI 2.0 24× PCI-E 3.0)	3× DDR3-1600	95W	May 14, 2012	$1106
LGA 1356 Dual Socket	Xeon E5	2450L	8 (16)	20MB	1.8 GHz	2.3 GHz	1× 8.0GT/s QPI (DMI 2.0 24× PCI-E 3.0)	3× DDR3-1600	70W	May 14, 2012	$1106
LGA 1356 Dual Socket	Xeon E5	2448L	8 (16)	20MB	1.8 GHz	2.1 GHz	1× 8.0GT/s QPI (DMI 2.0 24× PCI-E 3.0)	3× DDR3-1600	70W	May 14, 2012	$1151
LGA 1356 Dual Socket	Xeon E5	2449L	8 (16)	20MB	1.4 GHz	1.8 GHz	1× 8.0GT/s QPI (DMI 2.0 24× PCI-E 3.0)	3× DDR3-1600	50W	May 14, 2012	OEM
LGA 1356 Dual Socket	Xeon E5	2440	6 (12)	15MB	2.4 GHz	2.9 GHz	1× 7.2GT/s QPI	3× DDR3-1333	95W	May 14, 2012	$834
LGA 1356 Dual Socket	Xeon E5	2430	6 (12)	15MB	2.2 GHz	2.7 GHz	1× 7.2GT/s QPI	3× DDR3-1333	95W	May 14, 2012	$551
LGA 1356 Dual Socket	Xeon E5	2420	6 (12)	15MB	1.9 GHz	2.4 GHz	1× 7.2GT/s QPI	3× DDR3-1333	95W	May 14, 2012	$388
LGA 1356 Dual Socket	Xeon E5	2430L	6 (12)	15MB	2.0 GHz	2.5 GHz	1× 7.2GT/s QPI	3× DDR3-1333	60W	May 14, 2012	$662
LGA 1356 Dual Socket	Xeon E5	2428L	6 (12)	15MB	1.8 GHz	2.0 GHz	1× 7.2GT/s QPI	3× DDR3-1333	60W	May 14, 2012	$628
LGA 1356 Dual Socket	Xeon E5	2418L	4 (8)	10MB	2.0 GHz	2.1 GHz	1× 6.4GT/s QPI	3× DDR3-1333	50W	May 14, 2012	$387
LGA 1356 Dual Socket	Xeon E5	2407	4 (4)	10MB	2.2 GHz	N/A	1× 6.4GT/s QPI	3x DDR3-1066	80W	May 14, 2012	$250
LGA 1356 Dual Socket	Xeon E5	2403	4 (4)	10MB	1.8 GHz	N/A	1× 6.4GT/s QPI	3x DDR3-1066	80W	May 14, 2012	$192
LGA 1356	Xeon E5	1428L	6 (12)	15MB	1.8 GHz	N/A	1× 5.0GT/s QPI	3x DDR3-1333	60W	May 14, 2012	$395
LGA 1356	Xeon E5	1410	4 (8)	10MB	2.8 GHz	3.2 GHz	1× 5.0GT/s QPI	3x DDR3-1333	80W	May 14, 2012	N/A
LGA 1356	Pentium	1407	2 (2)	5MB	2.8 GHz	N/A	DMI 2.0 24× PCI-E 3.0	3x DDR3-1066	80W	May 14, 2012	N/A
LGA 1356	Pentium	1403	2 (2)	5MB	2.6 GHz	N/A	DMI 2.0 24× PCI-E 3.0	3x DDR3-1066	80W	May 14, 2012	N/A
LGA 1356	Pentium	1405	2 (2)	5MB	1.2 GHz	1.8 GHz	DMI 2.0 24× PCI-E 3.0	3x DDR3-1066	40W	2012-08	$143

== Sandy Bridge Xeon ==
- All models support: MMX, SSE, SSE2, SSE3, SSSE3, SSE4.1, SSE4.2, AVX, Enhanced Intel SpeedStep Technology (EIST), Intel 64, XD bit (an NX bit implementation), TXT, Intel VT-x, Intel EPT, Intel VT-d, Hyper-threading (except E3-1220 and E3-1225), Turbo Boost, AES-NI, Smart Cache.
- All models support uni-processor configurations only.
- Intel HD Graphics P3000 uses drivers that are optimized and certified for professional applications, similar to Nvidia Quadro and AMD FirePro products.
- Die size: D2: 216 mm^{2}, Q0: 131 mm^{2}
- Steppings: D2, Q0

Socket	Model		Cores (threads)	CPU clock rate		L3 Cache	Integrated Graphics	Interface	Supported memory	TDP	Release date	Price (USD)
Socket	Model		Cores (threads)	Base	Turbo	L3 Cache	Integrated Graphics	Interface	Supported memory	TDP	Release date	Price (USD)
LGA 1155	Xeon E3	1290	4 (8)	3.6 GHz	4.0 GHz	8MB	N/A	DMI 2.0	2× DDR3-1333	95W	May 29, 2011	$885
LGA 1155	Xeon E3	1280	4 (8)	3.5 GHz	3.9 GHz	8MB	N/A	DMI 2.0	2× DDR3-1333	95W	April 3, 2011	$612
LGA 1155	Xeon E3	1270	4 (8)	3.4 GHz	3.8 GHz	8MB	N/A	DMI 2.0	2× DDR3-1333	80W	April 3, 2011	$328
LGA 1155	Xeon E3	1240	4 (8)	3.3 GHz	3.7 GHz	8MB	N/A	DMI 2.0	2× DDR3-1333	80W	April 3, 2011	$250
LGA 1155	Xeon E3	1230	4 (8)	3.2 GHz	3.6 GHz	8MB	N/A	DMI 2.0	2× DDR3-1333	80W	April 3, 2011	$215
LGA 1155	Xeon E3	1220	4 (4)	3.1 GHz	3.4 GHz	8MB	N/A	DMI 2.0	2× DDR3-1333	80W	April 3, 2011	$189
LGA 1155	Xeon E3	1220L	2 (4)	2.2 GHz	3.4 GHz	3MB	N/A	DMI 2.0	2× DDR3-1333	20W	April 3, 2011	$189
LGA 1155	Xeon E3	1275	4 (8)	3.4 GHz	3.8 GHz	8MB	HD Graphics P3000	DMI 2.0	2× DDR3-1333	95W	April 3, 2011	$339
LGA 1155	Xeon E3	1245	4 (8)	3.3 GHz	3.7 GHz	8MB	HD Graphics P3000	DMI 2.0	2× DDR3-1333	95W	April 3, 2011	$262
LGA 1155	Xeon E3	1235	4 (8)	3.2 GHz	3.6 GHz	8MB	HD Graphics P3000	DMI 2.0	2× DDR3-1333	95W	April 3, 2011	$240
LGA 1155	Xeon E3	1225	4 (4)	3.1 GHz	3.4 GHz	6MB	HD Graphics P3000	DMI 2.0	2× DDR3-1333	95W	April 3, 2011	$194
LGA 1155	Xeon E3	1265L	4 (8)	2.4 GHz	3.3 GHz	8MB	HD Graphics P3000	DMI 2.0	2× DDR3-1333	45W	April 3, 2011	OEM
LGA 1155	Xeon E3	1260L	4 (8)	2.4 GHz	3.3 GHz	8MB	HD Graphics 2000	DMI 2.0	2× DDR3-1333	45W	April 3, 2011	$294

== Gladden ==
- BGA 1284 package
- All models support: MMX, SSE, SSE2, SSE3, SSSE3, SSE4.1, SSE4.2, AVX, Enhanced Intel SpeedStep Technology (EIST), Intel 64, XD bit (an NX bit implementation), TXT, Intel VT-x, Intel EPT, Intel VT-d, Hyper-threading, AES-NI.
- All models support uni-processor configurations only.
- Die size:216 mm^{2}
- Steppings: D2

Socket	Model		Cores (threads)	CPU clock rate		L3cache	TDP	I/O bus	Memory	Release date	Price (USD)
Socket	Model		Cores (threads)	Base	Turbo	L3cache	TDP	I/O bus	Memory	Release date	Price (USD)
BGA 1284	Xeon E3	1125C	4 (8)	2.0 GHz	N/A	8MB	40W	DMI 2.0 20× PCIe 2.0	2× DDR3-1600	May 2012	$444
BGA 1284	Xeon E3	1105C	4 (8)	1.0 GHz	N/A	6MB	25W	DMI 2.0 20× PCIe 2.0	2× DDR3-1600	May 2012	$333

== See also ==
- List of Intel chipsets
- List of Intel CPU microarchitectures
