= LGA 2011 =

CPU socket created by Intel

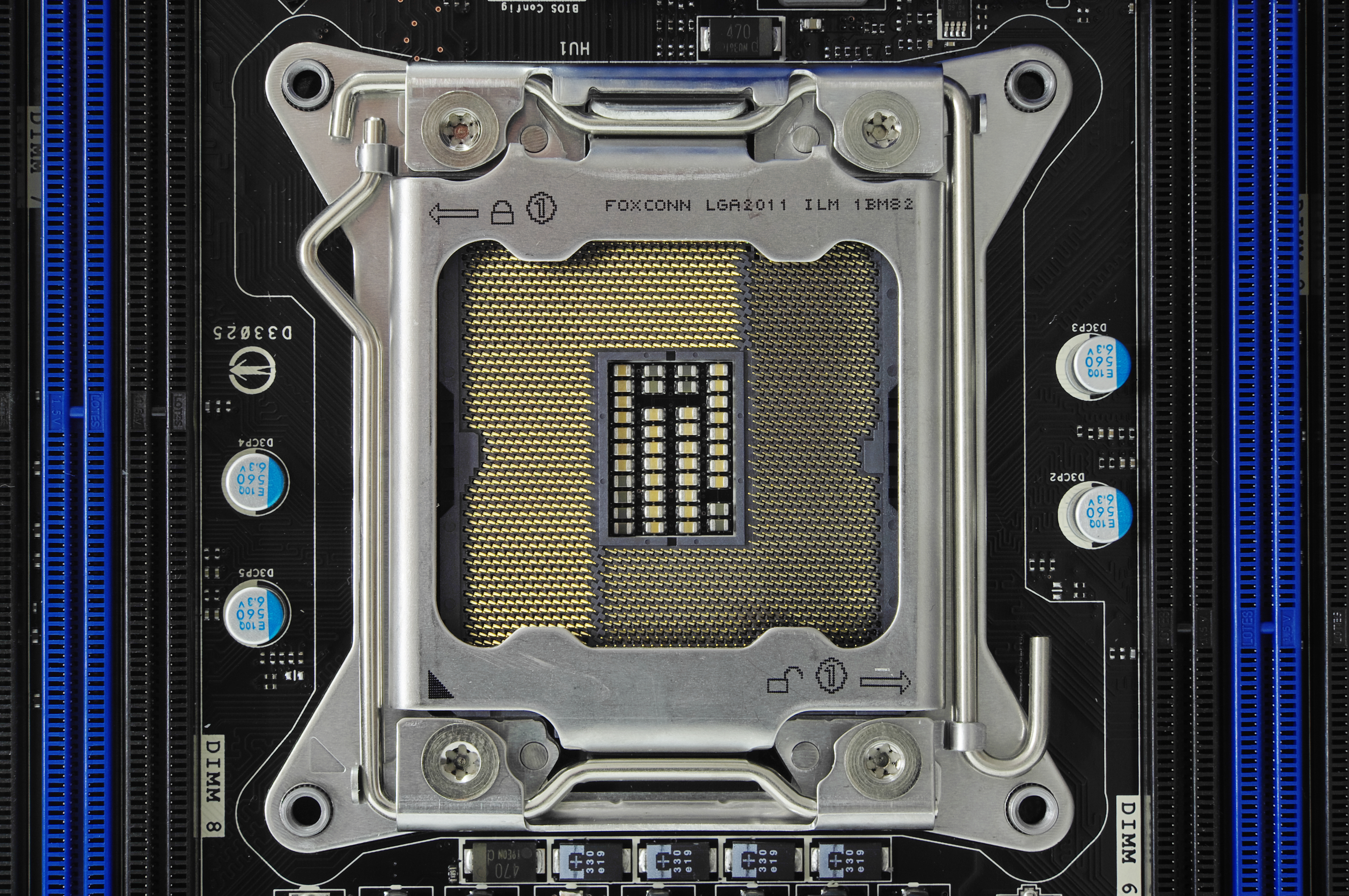
- Type: LGA-ZIF
- Chip form factors: Flip-chip
- Contacts: 2011
- FSB protocol: Intel QPI; DMI 2.0
- FSB frequency: 1× to 2× QPI, DMI 2.0
- Processor dimensions: 52.5 × 45 mm 2,363 mm²
- Processors: Sandy Bridge-E/EP (1.80 - 3.60 GHz) Ivy Bridge-E/EP (1.70 - 3.70 GHz) Haswell-E/EP (LGA2011-v3); Broadwell-E (LGA2011-v3)
- Predecessor: LGA 1366 (desktops, low- and mid-end servers); LGA 1567 (high-end servers)
- Successor: LGA 2066 (desktops and workstations); LGA 3647 (servers); Xeon E3 family, later renamed Xeon E, uses consumer-grade sockets.
- Memory support: DDR3; DDR4
- This article is part of the CPU socket series

LGA 2011, also called Socket R, is a CPU socket by Intel released on November 14, 2011. It launched along with LGA 1356 to replace its predecessor, LGA 1366 (Socket B) and LGA 1567. While LGA 1356 was designed for dual-processor or low-end servers, LGA 2011 was designed for high-end desktops and high-performance servers. The socket has 2011 protruding pins that touch contact points on the underside of the processor.

The LGA 2011 socket uses QPI to connect the CPU to additional CPUs. DMI 2.0 is used to connect the processor to the PCH. The memory controller and 40 PCI Express (PCIe) lanes are integrated into the CPU. On a secondary processor an extra ×4 PCIe interface replaces the DMI interface. As with its predecessor LGA 1366, there is no provisioning for integrated graphics. This socket supports four DDR3 or DDR4 SDRAM memory channels with up to three unbuffered or registered DIMMs per channel, as well as up to 40 PCI Express 2.0 or 3.0 lanes. LGA 2011 also has to ensure platform scalability beyond eight cores and 20 MB of cache.

The LGA 2011 socket is used by Sandy Bridge-E/EP and Ivy Bridge-E/EP processors with the corresponding X79 (E – enthusiast class) and C600-series (EP – Xeon class) chipsets.

LGA 2011-1 (Socket R2), an updated generation of the socket and the successor of LGA 1567, is used for Ivy Bridge-EX (Xeon E7 v2), Haswell-EX (Xeon E7 v3) and Broadwell-EX (Xeon E7 v4) CPUs, which were released in February 2014, May 2015 and July 2016, respectively.

LGA 2011-v3 (Socket R3, also referred to as LGA 2011-3) is another updated generation of the socket, used for Haswell-E and Haswell-EP CPUs and Broadwell-E, which were released in August and September 2014, respectively. Updated socket generations are physically similar to LGA 2011. Different electrical signals, keying of the Independent Loading Mechanism (ILM) and integrating DDR4 memory controller rather than DDR3, prevent backward compatibility with older CPUs.

In the server market, it was succeeded by LGA 3647, while in high-end desktop and workstation markets its successor is LGA 2066. Alongside LGA 1155, it is the last Intel socket to support versions below Windows 7 and Windows Server 2008 R2 for the original and 2011-1 releases only, as LGA 2011-3 required both operating systems. The Xeon E3 family of processors, later renamed Xeon E, uses consumer-grade sockets.

== Physical design and socket generations ==
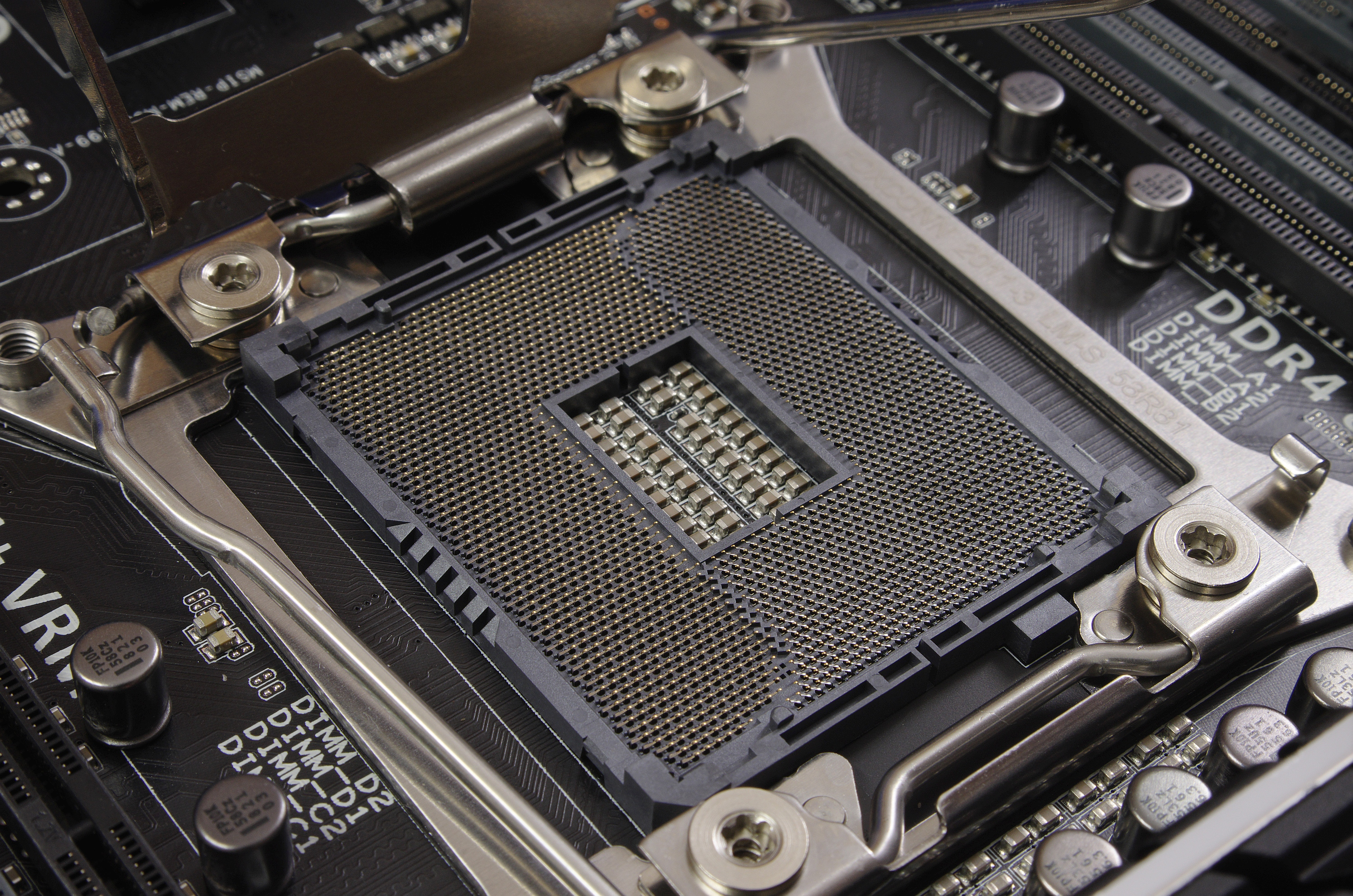
An LGA 2011-v3 socket

Intel CPU sockets use the so-called Independent Loading Mechanism (ILM) retention device to apply the specific amount of uniform pressure required to correctly hold the CPU against the socket interface. As part of their design, ILMs have differently placed protrusions which are intended to mate with cutouts in CPU packagings. These protrusions, also known as ILM keying, have the purpose of preventing installation of incompatible CPUs into otherwise physically compatible sockets, and preventing ILMs to be mounted with a 180-degree rotation relative to the CPU socket.

Different variants (or generations) of the LGA 2011 socket and associated CPUs come with different ILM keying, which makes it possible to install CPUs only into generation-matching sockets. CPUs that are intended to be mounted into LGA 2011-0 (R), LGA 2011-1 (R2) or LGA 2011-v3 (R3) sockets are all mechanically compatible regarding their dimensions and ball pattern pitches, but the designations of contacts are different between generations of the LGA 2011 socket and CPUs, which makes them electrically and logically incompatible. Original LGA 2011 socket is used for Sandy Bridge-E/EP and Ivy Bridge-E/EP processors, while LGA 2011-1 is used for Ivy Bridge-EX (Xeon E7 v2), Haswell-EX (Xeon E7 V3) and Broadwell-EX (Xeon E7 v4) CPUs, which were released in February 2014, May 2015 and July 2016, respectively. LGA 2011-v3 socket is used for Haswell-E and Haswell-EP CPUs, which were released in August and September 2014, respectively.

Two types of ILM exist, with different shapes and heatsink mounting hole patterns, both with M4 x 0.7 threads: square ILM (80×80 mm mounting pattern), and narrow ILM (56×94 mm mounting pattern). Square ILM is the standard type, while the narrow one is alternatively available for space-constrained applications. A matching heatsink is required for each ILM type.

== Chipsets ==
Information for the Intel X79 (for desktop) and C600 series (for workstations and servers, codenamed Romley) chipsets is in the table below. The Romley (EP) platform was delayed approximately one quarter, allegedly due to a SAS controller bug.

The X79 appears to contain the same silicon as the C600 series, with ECS having enabled the SAS controller for one of their boards, even though SAS is not officially supported by Intel for X79.

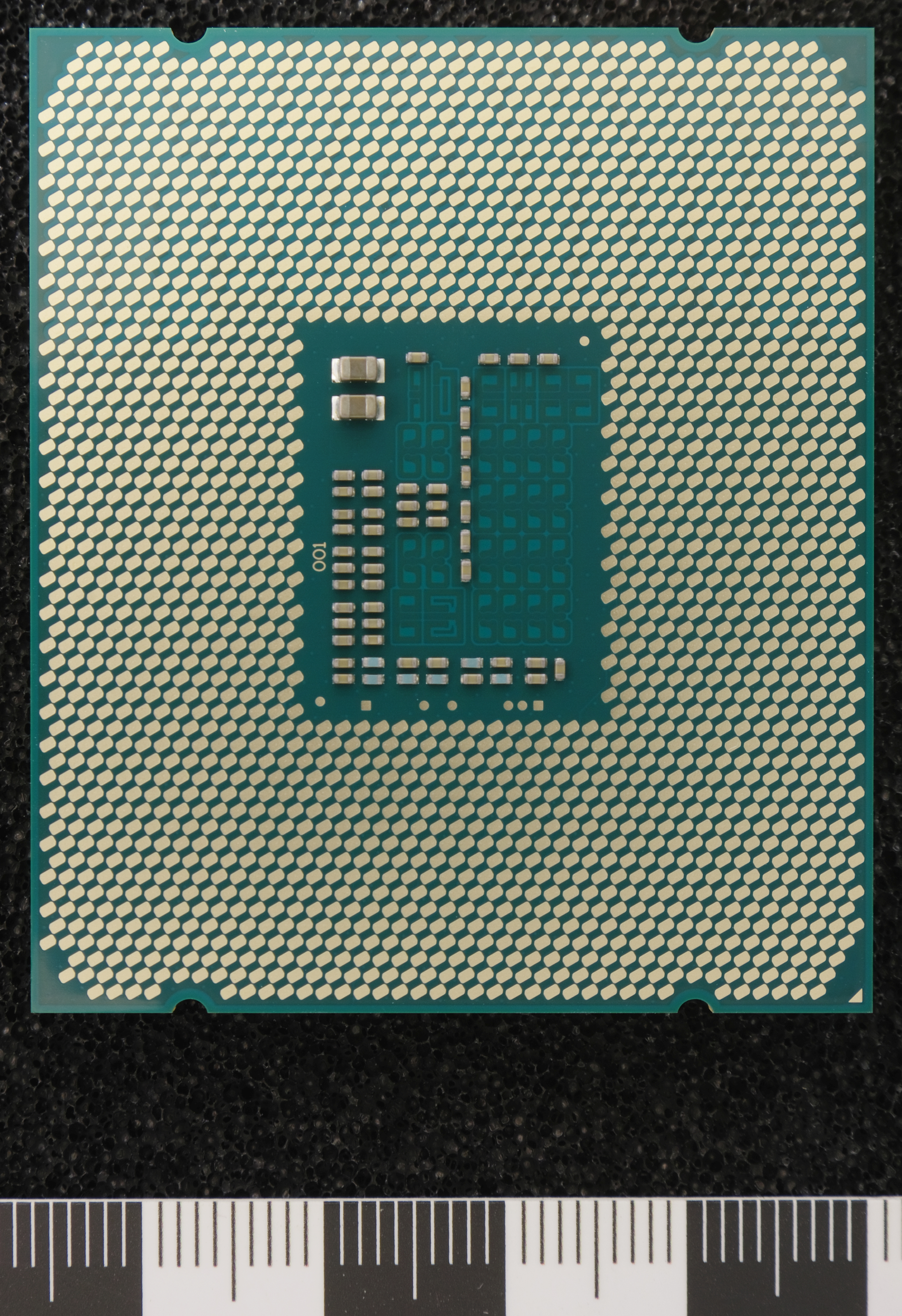
A Haswell-E CPU

Name	X79	X99	C602J	C602	C604	C606	C608	C612
CPU Support	Sandy Bridge-E, Ivy Bridge-E	Haswell-E, Broadwell-E	Sandy Bridge-EP, Ivy Bridge-EP					Haswell-EP, Broadwell-EP
Memory standard and maximum slots	Quad-channel DDR3 up to two DIMMs per channel	Quad-channel DDR4 up to two DIMMs per channel	Quad-channel DDR3 up to three DIMMs per channel					Quad-channel DDR4 up to three DIMMs per channel
Overclocking	Yes		No					
Embedded GPU	No							
RAID 0/1/5/10	Yes							
Maximum USB ports (USB 3.0)	14 (0)	14 (6)	14 (0)					14 (6)
Maximum SATA ports (SATA 3.0, 6 Gbit/s)	6 (2)	10 (10)	6 (2)	6 (2) + 4 SCU SATA	6 (2) + 4 SCU SAS/SATA	6 (2) + 8 SCU SAS/SATA		10 (10)
CPU-provided PCIe configuration	40 PCIe 3.0 lanes		40 PCIe lanes per CPU					
Chipset-provided PCIe configuration	8 PCIe 2.0 lanes		8 PCIe 2.0 lanes					
PCI	Yes	No	Yes					No
Intel Rapid Storage Technology	Yes	v13.1	Enterprise edition					Yes
Smart Response Technology	No	Yes	No					Yes
Intel vPro	No		Yes					
Chipset TDP	7.8 W	6.5 W	8 W			12 W		6.5 W
Chipset lithography	65 nm	32 nm	65 nm					32 nm
Release date	2011-11-14	2014-08-29	Q1 2012					2014-09-08

== Compatible processors ==
=== Desktop processors ===
Desktop processors compatible with LGA 2011, 2011–3 socket are Sandy Bridge-E, Ivy Bridge-E, Haswell-E and Broadwell-E.

- Sandy Bridge-E and Ivy Bridge-E processors are compatible with the Intel X79 chipset.
- Haswell-E and Broadwell-E processors are compatible with the Intel X99 chipset.
- All models support: MMX, SSE, SSE2, SSE3, SSSE3, SSE4.1, SSE4.2, AVX, Enhanced Intel SpeedStep Technology (EIST), Intel 64, XD bit (an NX bit implementation), TXT, Intel VT-x, Intel VT-d, Turbo Boost, AES-NI, Smart Cache, Hyper-threading, except the C1 stepping models, which lack VT-d.
- Sandy Bridge-E, Ivy Bridge-E and Haswell-E processors are not bundled with standard air-cooled CPU coolers. Intel is offering a standard CPU cooler, and a liquid-cooled CPU cooler, which are both sold separately.

Socket	Codename	Processor model	Cores (threads)	CPU clock rate		Multiplier	L2 cache	L3 cache	PCIe lanes	TDP	Release date	Price (US)
Socket	Codename	Processor model	Cores (threads)	Base	Turbo	Multiplier	L2 cache	L3 cache	PCIe lanes	TDP	Release date	Price (US)
LGA 2011	Sandy Bridge-E	Core i7-3970X Extreme Edition	6 (12)	3.5 GHz	4.0 GHz	Unlocked	6 × 256 KB	15MB	40× PCIe2.0	150W	2012 Q4	$999
LGA 2011	Sandy Bridge-E	Core i7-3960X Extreme Edition	6 (12)	3.3 GHz	3.9 GHz	Unlocked	6 × 256 KB	15MB	40× PCIe2.0	130W	2011-11-14	$990
LGA 2011	Sandy Bridge-E	Core i7-3930K	6 (12)	3.2 GHz	3.8 GHz	Unlocked	6 × 256 KB	12MB	40× PCIe2.0	130W	2011-11-14	$555
LGA 2011	Sandy Bridge-E	Core i7-3820	4 (8)	3.6 GHz	3.8 GHz	Partially Unlocked	4 × 256 KB	10MB	40× PCIe2.0	130W	2012-02-14	$305
LGA 2011	Ivy Bridge-E	Core i7-4960X Extreme Edition	6 (12)	3.6 GHz	4.0 GHz	Unlocked	6 × 256 KB	15MB	40× PCIe 3.0	130W	2013 Q3	$999
LGA 2011	Ivy Bridge-E	Core i7-4930K	6 (12)	3.4 GHz	3.9 GHz	Unlocked	6 × 256 KB	12MB	40× PCIe 3.0	130W	2013 Q3	$583
LGA 2011	Ivy Bridge-E	Core i7-4820K	4 (8)	3.7 GHz	3.9 GHz	Unlocked	4 × 256 KB	10MB	40× PCIe 3.0	130W	2013 Q3	$323
LGA 2011-3	Haswell-E	Core i7-5960X Extreme Edition	8 (16)	3.0 GHz	3.5 GHz	Unlocked	8 × 256 KB	20MB	40× PCIe 3.0	140W	2014-08-29	$999
LGA 2011-3	Haswell-E	Core i7-5930K	6 (12)	3.5 GHz	3.7 GHz	Unlocked	6 x 256 KB	15MB	40× PCIe 3.0	140W	2014-08-29	$550
LGA 2011-3	Haswell-E	Core i7-5820K	6 (12)	3.3 GHz	3.6 GHz	Unlocked	6 x 256 KB	15MB	28× PCIe3.0	140W	2014-08-29	$396
LGA 2011-3	Broadwell-E	Core i7-6950X Extreme Edition	10 (20)	3.0 GHz	3.5 GHz	Unlocked	10 x 256 KB	25MB	40× PCIe3.0	140W	2016-05-30	$1723
LGA 2011-3	Broadwell-E	Core i7-6900K	8 (16)	3.2 GHz	3.7 GHz	Unlocked	8 x 256 KB	20MB	40× PCIe3.0	140W	2016-05-30	$1089
LGA 2011-3	Broadwell-E	Core i7-6850K	6 (12)	3.6 GHz	3.8 GHz	Unlocked	6 x 256 KB	15MB	40× PCIe3.0	140W	2016-05-30	$617
LGA 2011-3	Broadwell-E	Core i7-6800K	6 (12)	3.4 GHz	3.6 GHz	Unlocked	6 x 256 KB	15MB	28× PCIe3.0	140W	2016-05-30	$434

^{1} The X79 chipset allows for increasing the base clock (BCLK), Intel calls it CPU Strap, by 1.00×, 1.25×, 1.66× or 2.50×. The CPU frequency is derived by the BCLK times the CPU multiplier.

=== Server processors ===
Server processors compatible with LGA 2011 socket are Sandy Bridge-EP, Ivy Bridge-E, Haswell-E and Broadwell-E.

- All models support: MMX, SSE, SSE2, SSE3, SSSE3, SSE4.1, SSE4.2, AVX, Enhanced Intel SpeedStep Technology (EIST), Intel 64, XD bit (an NX bit implementation), TXT, Intel VT-x, Intel VT-d, AES-NI, Smart Cache. Not all support Hyper-threading and Turbo Boost.

==== Sandy Bridge-EP (Xeon E5) ====
Socket	Model		Cores (threads)	L3 Cache	CPU clock rate		Interface	Supported memory	TDP	Release date	Price (USD)
Socket	Model		Cores (threads)	L3 Cache	Base	Turbo	Interface	Supported memory	TDP	Release date	Price (USD)
Up to 4× LGA 2011	Xeon E5	4650	8 (16)	20 MB	2.7 GHz	3.3 GHz	2× QPI DMI 2.0 40× PCI-E 3.0	Up to Quad-channel DDR3-1600	130W	2012-05-14	$3616
Up to 4× LGA 2011	Xeon E5	4650L	8 (16)	20 MB	2.6 GHz	3.1 GHz	2× QPI DMI 2.0 40× PCI-E 3.0	Up to Quad-channel DDR3-1600	115W	2012-05-14	$3616
Up to 4× LGA 2011	Xeon E5	4640	8 (16)	20 MB	2.4 GHz	2.8 GHz	2× QPI DMI 2.0 40× PCI-E 3.0	Up to Quad-channel DDR3-1600	95W	2012-05-14	$2725
Up to 4× LGA 2011	Xeon E5	4620	8 (16)	16 MB	2.2 GHz	2.6 GHz	2× QPI DMI 2.0 40× PCI-E 3.0	4× DDR3-1333	95W	2012-05-14	$1611
Up to 4× LGA 2011	Xeon E5	4617	6 (6)	15 MB	2.9 GHz	3.4 GHz	2× QPI DMI 2.0 40× PCI-E 3.0	4× DDR3-1600	130W	2012-05-14	$1611
Up to 4× LGA 2011	Xeon E5	4610	6 (12)	15 MB	2.4 GHz	2.9 GHz	2× QPI DMI 2.0 40× PCI-E 3.0	4× DDR3-1333	95W	2012-05-14	$1219
Up to 4× LGA 2011	Xeon E5	4607	6 (12)	12 MB	2.2 GHz	N/A	2× QPI DMI 2.0 40× PCI-E 3.0	4× DDR3-1066	95W	2012-05-14	$885
Up to 4× LGA 2011	Xeon E5	4603	4 (8)	10 MB	2.0 GHz	N/A	2× QPI DMI 2.0 40× PCI-E 3.0	4× DDR3-1066	95W	2012-05-14	$551
Up to 2× LGA 2011	Xeon E5	2687W	8 (16)	20 MB	3.1 GHz	3.8 GHz	2× QPI DMI 2.0 40× PCI-E 3.0	4× DDR3-1600	150W	2012-03-06	$1885
Up to 2× LGA 2011	Xeon E5	2690	8 (16)	20 MB	2.9 GHz	3.8 GHz	2× QPI DMI 2.0 40× PCI-E 3.0	4× DDR3-1600	135W	2012-03-06	$2057
Up to 2× LGA 2011	Xeon E5	2680	8 (16)	20 MB	2.7 GHz	3.5 GHz	2× QPI DMI 2.0 40× PCI-E 3.0	4× DDR3-1600	130W	2012-03-06	$1723
Up to 2× LGA 2011	Xeon E5	2689	8 (16)	20 MB	2.6 GHz	3.6 GHz	2× QPI DMI 2.0 40× PCI-E 3.0	4× DDR3-1600	115W	2012-03-06	OEM
Up to 2× LGA 2011	Xeon E5	2670	8 (16)	20 MB	2.6 GHz	3.3 GHz	2× QPI DMI 2.0 40× PCI-E 3.0	4× DDR3-1600	115W	2012-03-06	$1552
Up to 2× LGA 2011	Xeon E5	2665	8 (16)	20 MB	2.4 GHz	3.1 GHz	2× QPI DMI 2.0 40× PCI-E 3.0	4× DDR3-1600	115W	2012-03-06	$1440
Up to 2× LGA 2011	Xeon E5	2660	8 (16)	20 MB	2.2 GHz	3.0 GHz	2× QPI DMI 2.0 40× PCI-E 3.0	4× DDR3-1600	95W	2012-03-06	$1329
Up to 2× LGA 2011	Xeon E5	2658	8 (16)	20 MB	2.1 GHz	2.4 GHz	2× QPI DMI 2.0 40× PCI-E 3.0	4× DDR3-1600	95W	2012-03-06	$1186
Up to 2× LGA 2011	Xeon E5	2650	8 (16)	20 MB	2.0 GHz	2.8 GHz	2× QPI DMI 2.0 40× PCI-E 3.0	4× DDR3-1600	95W	2012-03-06	$1107
Up to 2× LGA 2011	Xeon E5	2650L	8 (16)	20 MB	1.8 GHz	2.3 GHz	2× QPI DMI 2.0 40× PCI-E 3.0	4× DDR3-1600	70W	2012-03-06	$1107
Up to 2× LGA 2011	Xeon E5	2648L	8 (16)	20 MB	1.8 GHz	2.1 GHz	2× QPI DMI 2.0 40× PCI-E 3.0	4× DDR3-1600	70W	2012-03-06	$1186
Up to 2× LGA 2011	Xeon E5	2667	6 (12)	15 MB	2.9 GHz	3.5 GHz	2× QPI DMI 2.0 40× PCI-E 3.0	4× DDR3-1600	130W	2012-03-06	$1552
Up to 2× LGA 2011	Xeon E5	2640	6 (12)	15 MB	2.5 GHz	3.0 GHz	2× QPI DMI 2.0 40× PCI-E 3.0	4× DDR3-1333	95W	2012-03-06	$884
Up to 2× LGA 2011	Xeon E5	2630	6 (12)	15 MB	2.3 GHz	2.8 GHz	2× QPI DMI 2.0 40× PCI-E 3.0	4× DDR3-1333	95W	2012-03-06	$612
Up to 2× LGA 2011	Xeon E5	2620	6 (12)	15 MB	2.0 GHz	2.5 GHz	2× QPI DMI 2.0 40× PCI-E 3.0	4× DDR3-1333	95W	2012-03-06	$406
Up to 2× LGA 2011	Xeon E5	2630L	6 (12)	15 MB	2.0 GHz	2.5 GHz	2× QPI DMI 2.0 40× PCI-E 3.0	4× DDR3-1333	60W	2012-03-06	$662
Up to 2× LGA 2011	Xeon E5	2628L	6 (12)	15 MB	1.8 GHz	N/A	2× QPI DMI 2.0 40× PCI-E 3.0	4× DDR3-1333	60W	2012-03-06	OEM
Up to 2× LGA 2011	Xeon E5	2643	4 (8)	10 MB	3.3 GHz	3.5 GHz	2× QPI DMI 2.0 40× PCI-E 3.0	4× DDR3-1600	130W	2012-03-06	$884
Up to 2× LGA 2011	Xeon E5	2618L	4 (8)	10 MB	1.8 GHz	N/A	2× QPI DMI 2.0 40× PCI-E 3.0	4× DDR3-1066	50W	2012-03-06	OEM
Up to 2× LGA 2011	Xeon E5	2609	4 (4)	10 MB	2.4 GHz	N/A	2× QPI DMI 2.0 40× PCI-E 3.0	4× DDR3-1066	80W	2012-03-06	$246
Up to 2× LGA 2011	Xeon E5	2603	4 (4)	10 MB	1.8 GHz	N/A	2× QPI DMI 2.0 40× PCI-E 3.0	4× DDR3-1066	80W	2012-03-06	$202
Up to 2× LGA 2011	Xeon E5	2637	2 (4)	5 MB	3.0 GHz	3.5 GHz	2× QPI DMI 2.0 40× PCI-E 3.0	4× DDR3-1600	80W	2012-03-06	$884
LGA 2011	Xeon E5	1660	6 (12)	15 MB	3.3 GHz	3.9 GHz	2× QPI DMI 2.0 40× PCI-E 3.0	4× DDR3-1600	130W	2012-03-06	$1080
LGA 2011	Xeon E5	1650	6 (12)	12 MB	3.2 GHz	3.8 GHz	2× QPI DMI 2.0 40× PCI-E 3.0	4× DDR3-1600	130W	2012-03-06	$583
LGA 2011	Xeon E5	1620	4 (8)	10 MB	3.6 GHz	3.8 GHz	2× QPI DMI 2.0 40× PCI-E 3.0	4× DDR3-1600	130W	2012-03-06	$294
LGA 2011	Xeon E5	1607	4 (4)	10 MB	3.0 GHz	N/A	2× QPI DMI 2.0 40× PCI-E 3.0	4× DDR3-1066	130W	2012-03-06	$244
LGA 2011	Xeon E5	1603	4 (4)	10 MB	2.8 GHz	N/A	2× QPI DMI 2.0 40× PCI-E 3.0	4× DDR3-1066	130W	2012-03-06	$198

==== Ivy Bridge-EP (Xeon E5 v2) ====
Socket	Model		Cores (threads)	L3 Cache	CPU clock rate		Interface	Supported memory	TDP	Release date	Price (USD)
Socket	Model		Cores (threads)	L3 Cache	Base	Turbo	Interface	Supported memory	TDP	Release date	Price (USD)
Up to 2 × LGA 2011	Xeon E5	2697 v2	12 (24)	30MB	2.7 GHz	3.5 GHz	2× 8.0GT/s QPI DMI 2.0 40× PCIe 3.0	4× DDR3-1866	130W	2013-09-10	$2614
Up to 2 × LGA 2011	Xeon E5	2696 v2	12 (24)	30MB	2.5 GHz	3.5 GHz	2× 8.0GT/s QPI DMI 2.0 40× PCIe 3.0	4× DDR3-1866	120W	2013-09-10	OEM
Up to 2 × LGA 2011	Xeon E5	2695 v2	12 (24)	30MB	2.4 GHz	3.2 GHz	2× 8.0GT/s QPI DMI 2.0 40× PCIe 3.0	4× DDR3-1866	115W	2013-09-10	$2336
Up to 2 × LGA 2011	Xeon E5	2692 v2	12 (24)	30MB	2.2 GHz	3.0 GHz	2× 8.0GT/s QPI DMI 2.0 40× PCIe 3.0	4× DDR3-1866	115W	2013-06	Tianhe-2 OEM
Up to 2 × LGA 2011	Xeon E5	2651 v2	12 (24)	30MB	1.8 GHz	2.2 GHz	2× 8.0GT/s QPI DMI 2.0 40× PCIe 3.0	4× DDR3-1600	105W	2013 Q4	OEM
Up to 2 × LGA 2011	Xeon E5	2690 v2	10 (20)	25MB	3.0 GHz	3.6 GHz	2× 8.0GT/s QPI DMI 2.0 40× PCIe 3.0	4× DDR3-1866	130W	2013-09-10	$2057
Up to 2 × LGA 2011	Xeon E5	2680 v2	10 (20)	25MB	2.8 GHz	3.6 GHz	2× 8.0GT/s QPI DMI 2.0 40× PCIe 3.0	4× DDR3-1866	115W	2013-09-10	$1723
Up to 2 × LGA 2011	Xeon E5	2670 v2	10 (20)	25MB	2.5 GHz	3.3 GHz	2× 8.0GT/s QPI DMI 2.0 40× PCIe 3.0	4× DDR3-1866	115W	2013-09-10	$1552
Up to 2 × LGA 2011	Xeon E5	2660 v2	10 (20)	25MB	2.2 GHz	3.0 GHz	2× 8.0GT/s QPI DMI 2.0 40× PCIe 3.0	4× DDR3-1866	95W	2013-09-10	$1389
Up to 2 × LGA 2011	Xeon E5	2658 v2	10 (20)	25MB	2.4 GHz	3.0 GHz	2× 8.0GT/s QPI DMI 2.0 40× PCIe 3.0	4× DDR3-1866	95W	2013-09-10	$1440
Up to 2 × LGA 2011	Xeon E5	2650L v2	10 (20)	25MB	1.7 GHz	2.1 GHz	2× 8.0GT/s QPI DMI 2.0 40× PCIe 3.0	4× DDR3-1866	70W	2013-09-10	$1219
Up to 2 × LGA 2011	Xeon E5	2648L v2	10 (20)	25MB	1.9 GHz	2.5 GHz	2× 8.0GT/s QPI DMI 2.0 40× PCIe 3.0	4× DDR3-1866	70W	2013-09-10	$1218
Up to 2 × LGA 2011	Xeon E5	2687W v2	8 (16)	25MB	3.4 GHz	4.0 GHz	2× 8.0GT/s QPI DMI 2.0 40× PCIe 3.0	4× DDR3-1866	150W	2013-09-10	$2108
Up to 2 × LGA 2011	Xeon E5	2673 v2	8 (16)	25MB	3.3 GHz	4.0 GHz	2× 8.0GT/s QPI DMI 2.0 40× PCIe 3.0	4× DDR3-1866	110W	2013-12	N/A
Up to 2 × LGA 2011	Xeon E5	2667 v2	8 (16)	25MB	3.3 GHz	4.0 GHz	2× 8.0GT/s QPI DMI 2.0 40× PCIe 3.0	4× DDR3-1866	130W	2013-09-10	$2057
Up to 2 × LGA 2011	Xeon E5	2650 v2	8 (16)	20MB	2.6 GHz	3.4 GHz	2× 8.0GT/s QPI DMI 2.0 40× PCIe 3.0	4× DDR3-1866	95W	2013-09-10	$1166
Up to 2 × LGA 2011	Xeon E5	2640 v2	8 (16)	20MB	2.0 GHz	2.5 GHz	2× 7.2GT/s QPI	4× DDR3-1600	95W	2013-09-10	$885
Up to 2 × LGA 2011	Xeon E5	2628L v2	8 (16)	20MB	1.9 GHz	2.4 GHz	2× 7.2GT/s QPI	4× DDR3-1600	70W	2013-09-10	$1000
Up to 2 × LGA 2011	Xeon E5	2643 v2	6 (12)	25MB	3.5 GHz	3.8 GHz	2× 8.0GT/s QPI	4× DDR3-1866	130W	2013-09-10	$1552
Up to 2 × LGA 2011	Xeon E5	2630 v2	6 (12)	15MB	2.6 GHz	3.1 GHz	2× 7.2GT/s QPI	4× DDR3-1600	80W	2013-09-10	$612
Up to 2 × LGA 2011	Xeon E5	2620 v2	6 (12)	15MB	2.1 GHz	2.6 GHz	2× 7.2GT/s QPI	4× DDR3-1600	80W	2013-09-10	$406
Up to 2 × LGA 2011	Xeon E5	2630L v2	6 (12)	15MB	2.4 GHz	2.8 GHz	2× 7.2GT/s QPI	4× DDR3-1600	60W	2013-09-10	$612
Up to 2 × LGA 2011	Xeon E5	2618L v2	6 (12)	15MB	2.0 GHz	N/A	2× 6.4GT/s QPI	4× DDR3-1333	50W	2013-09-10	$520
Up to 2 × LGA 2011	Xeon E5	2637 v2	4 (8)	15MB	3.5 GHz	3.8 GHz	2× 8.0GT/s QPI	4× DDR3-1866	130W	2013-09-10	$996
Up to 2 × LGA 2011	Xeon E5	2609 v2	4 (4)	10MB	2.5 GHz	N/A	2× 6.4GT/s QPI	4× DDR3-1333	80W	2013-09-10	$294
Up to 2 × LGA 2011	Xeon E5	2603 v2	4 (4)	10MB	1.8 GHz	N/A	2× 6.4GT/s QPI	4× DDR3-1333	80W	2013-09-10	$202
LGA 2011	Xeon E5	1680 v2	8 (16)	25MB	3.0 GHz	3.9 GHz	DMI 2.0 40× PCI-E 3.0	4× DDR3-1866	130W	2013-09-10	$1723
LGA 2011	Xeon E5	1660 v2	6 (12)	15MB	3.7 GHz	4.0 GHz	DMI 2.0 40× PCI-E 3.0	4× DDR3-1866	130W	2013-09-10	$1083
LGA 2011	Xeon E5	1650 v2	6 (12)	12MB	3.5 GHz	3.9 GHz	DMI 2.0 40× PCI-E 3.0	4× DDR3-1866	130W	2013-09-10	$583
LGA 2011	Xeon E5	1620 v2	4 (8)	10MB	3.7 GHz	3.9 GHz	DMI 2.0 40× PCI-E 3.0	4× DDR3-1866	130W	2013-09-10	$294
LGA 2011	Xeon E5	1607 v2	4 (4)	10MB	3.0 GHz	N/A	DMI 2.0 40× PCI-E 3.0	4× DDR3-1600	130W	2013-09-10	$244

==== Ivy Bridge-EX (Xeon E7 v2) ====
All processors are released on February 18, 2014, unless noted otherwise.

Socket	Model		Cores (threads)	CPU clock rate		L3 Cache	Interface	Supported memory	TDP	Price (USD)
Socket	Model		Cores (threads)	Base	Turbo	L3 Cache	Interface	Supported memory	TDP	Price (USD)
Up to 8 × LGA 2011-1	Xeon E7	8895 v2	15 (30)	2.8 GHz	3.6 GHz	37.5MB	3× 8.0GT/s QPI 32× PCIe 3.0	4× DDR3-1600	155W	Oracle OEM
Up to 8 × LGA 2011-1	Xeon E7	8890 v2	15 (30)	2.8 GHz	3.4 GHz	37.5MB	3× 8.0GT/s QPI 32× PCIe 3.0	4× DDR3-1600	155W	$6841
Up to 8 × LGA 2011-1	Xeon E7	8880 v2	15 (30)	2.5 GHz	3.1 GHz	37.5MB	3× 8.0GT/s QPI 32× PCIe 3.0	4× DDR3-1600	130W	$5729
Up to 8 × LGA 2011-1	Xeon E7	8870 v2	15 (30)	2.3 GHz	2.9 GHz	37.5MB	3× 8.0GT/s QPI 32× PCIe 3.0	4× DDR3-1600	130W	$4616
Up to 8 × LGA 2011-1	Xeon E7	8880L v2	15 (30)	2.2 GHz	2.8 GHz	30MB	3× 8.0GT/s QPI 32× PCIe 3.0	4× DDR3-1600	105W	$5729
Up to 8 × LGA 2011-1	Xeon E7	8857 v2	12 (24)	3.0 GHz	3.6 GHz	30MB	3× 8.0GT/s QPI 32× PCIe 3.0	4× DDR3-1600	130W	$3838
Up to 8 × LGA 2011-1	Xeon E7	8850 v2	12 (12)	2.3 GHz	2.8 GHz	24MB	3× 8.0GT/s QPI 32× PCIe 3.0	4× DDR3-1600	105W	$3059
Up to 8 × LGA 2011-1	Xeon E7	8891 v2	10 (20)	3.2 GHz	3.7 GHz	37.5MB	3× 8.0GT/s QPI 32× PCIe 3.0	4× DDR3-1600	155W	$6841
Up to 8 × LGA 2011-1	Xeon E7	8893 v2	6 (12)	3.4 GHz	3.7 GHz	37.5MB	3× 8.0GT/s QPI 32× PCIe 3.0	4× DDR3-1600	155W	$6841
Up to 4× LGA 2011-1	Xeon E7	4890 v2	15 (30)	2.8 GHz	3.4 GHz	37.5MB	3× 8.0GT/s QPI 32× PCIe 3.0	4× DDR3-1600	155W	$6619
Up to 4× LGA 2011-1	Xeon E7	4880 v2	15 (30)	2.5 GHz	3.1 GHz	37.5MB	3× 8.0GT/s QPI 32× PCIe 3.0	4× DDR3-1600	130W	$5506
Up to 4× LGA 2011-1	Xeon E7	4870 v2	15 (30)	2.3 GHz	2.9 GHz	30MB	3× 8.0GT/s QPI 32× PCIe 3.0	4× DDR3-1600	130W	$4394
Up to 4× LGA 2011-1	Xeon E7	4860 v2	12 (24)	2.6 GHz	3.2 GHz	30MB	3× 8.0GT/s QPI 32× PCIe 3.0	4× DDR3-1600	130W	$3838
Up to 4× LGA 2011-1	Xeon E7	4850 v2	12 (24)	2.3 GHz	2.8 GHz	24MB	3× 7.2GT/s QPI	4× DDR3-1600	105W	$2837
Up to 4× LGA 2011-1	Xeon E7	4830 v2	10 (20)	2.2 GHz	2.7 GHz	20MB	3× 7.2GT/s QPI	4× DDR3-1600	105W	$2059
Up to 4× LGA 2011-1	Xeon E7	4820 v2	8 (16)	2.0 GHz	2.5 GHz	16MB	3× 7.2GT/s QPI	4× DDR3-1600	105W	$1446
Up to 4× LGA 2011-1	Xeon E7	4809 v2	6 (12)	1.9 GHz	N/A	12MB	3× 6.4GT/s QPI	4× DDR3-1333	105W	$1223
Up to 2× LGA 2011-1	Xeon E7	2890 v2	15 (30)	2.8 GHz	3.4 GHz	37.5MB	3× 8.0GT/s QPI	4× DDR3-1600	155W	$6451
Up to 2× LGA 2011-1	Xeon E7	2880 v2	15 (30)	2.5 GHz	3.1 GHz	37.5MB	3× 8.0GT/s QPI	4× DDR3-1600	130W	$5339
Up to 2× LGA 2011-1	Xeon E7	2870 v2	15 (30)	2.3 GHz	2.9 GHz	30MB	3× 8.0GT/s QPI	4× DDR3-1600	130W	$4227
Up to 2× LGA 2011-1	Xeon E7	2850 v2	12 (24)	2.3 GHz	2.8 GHz	24MB	3× 7.2GT/s QPI	4× DDR3-1600	105W	$2558

==== Haswell-EP (Xeon E5 v3) ====
Server processors for the LGA 2011-v3 socket are listed in the tables below. As one of the significant changes from the previous generation, they support DDR4 memory. All processors are released on September 8, 2014, unless noted otherwise.

Socket	Model		Cores (threads)	L3 Cache	CPU clock rate		Interface	Supported memory	TDP	Price (USD)
Socket	Model		Cores (threads)	L3 Cache	Base	Turbo	Interface	Supported memory	TDP	Price (USD)
Up to 4× LGA 2011-v3	Xeon E5	4669 v3	18 (36)	45MB	2.1 GHz	2.9 GHz	2× 9.6GT/s QPI 40× PCIe 3.0	4× DDR4-2133	135W	$7007
Up to 4× LGA 2011-v3	Xeon E5	4667 v3	16 (32)	40MB	2.0 GHz	2.9 GHz	2× 9.6GT/s QPI 40× PCIe 3.0	4× DDR4-2133	135W	$5729
Up to 4× LGA 2011-v3	Xeon E5	4660 v3	14 (28)	35MB	2.1 GHz	2.9 GHz	2× 9.6GT/s QPI 40× PCIe 3.0	4× DDR4-2133	120W	$4727
Up to 4× LGA 2011-v3	Xeon E5	4650 v3	12 (24)	30MB	2.1 GHz	2.8 GHz	2× 9.6GT/s QPI 40× PCIe 3.0	4× DDR4-2133	105W	$2838
Up to 4× LGA 2011-v3	Xeon E5	4640 v3	12 (24)	30MB	1.9 GHz	2.6 GHz	2× 8.0GT/s QPI 40× PCIe 3.0	4× DDR4-1866	105W	$2859
Up to 4× LGA 2011-v3	Xeon E5	4648 v3	12 (24)	30MB	1.7 GHz	2.2 GHz	2× 8.0GT/s QPI 40× PCIe 3.0	4× DDR4-1866	105W	$2405
Up to 4× LGA 2011-v3	Xeon E5	4627 v3	10 (10)	25MB	2.6 GHz	3.2 GHz	2× 8.0GT/s QPI 40× PCIe 3.0	4× DDR4-2133	135W	$2225
Up to 4× LGA 2011-v3	Xeon E5	4627 v3	10 (20)	25MB	2.6 GHz	3.2 GHz	2× 8.0GT/s QPI 40× PCIe 3.0	4× DDR4-2133	135W	$2225
Up to 4× LGA 2011-v3	Xeon E5	4620 v3	10 (20)	25MB	2.0 GHz	2.6 GHz	2× 8.0GT/s QPI 40× PCIe 3.0	4× DDR4-1866	105W	$1668
Up to 4× LGA 2011-v3	Xeon E5	4610 v3	10 (20)	25MB	1.7 GHz	N/A	2× 6.4GT/s QPI	4× DDR4-1600	105W	$1219
Up to 4× LGA 2011-v3	Xeon E5	4655 v3	6 (12)	20MB	2.9 GHz	3.1 GHz	2× 9.6GT/s QPI	4× DDR4-2133	135W	$4616
Up to 2× LGA 2011-v3	Xeon E5	2699 v3	18 (36)	45MB	2.3 GHz	3.6 GHz	2× 9.6GT/s QPI 40× PCIe 3.0	4× DDR4-2133	145W	$4115
Up to 2× LGA 2011-v3	Xeon E5	2698 v3	16 (32)	40MB	2.3 GHz	3.6 GHz	2× 9.6GT/s QPI 40× PCIe 3.0	4× DDR4-2133	135W	$3226
Up to 2× LGA 2011-v3	Xeon E5	2697 v3	14 (28)	35MB	2.6 GHz	3.6 GHz	2× 9.6GT/s QPI 40× PCIe 3.0	4× DDR4-2133	145W	$2702
Up to 2× LGA 2011-v3	Xeon E5	2695 v3	14 (28)	35MB	2.3 GHz	3.3 GHz	2× 9.6GT/s QPI 40× PCIe 3.0	4× DDR4-2133	120W	$2424
Up to 2× LGA 2011-v3	Xeon E5	2683 v3	14 (28)	35MB	2.0 GHz	3.0 GHz	2× 9.6GT/s QPI 40× PCIe 3.0	4× DDR4-2133	120W	$1846
Up to 2× LGA 2011-v3	Xeon E5	2690 v3	12 (24)	30MB	2.6 GHz	3.5 GHz	2× 9.6GT/s QPI 40× PCIe 3.0	4× DDR4-2133	135W	$2090
Up to 2× LGA 2011-v3	Xeon E5	2680 v3	12 (24)	30MB	2.5 GHz	3.3 GHz	2× 9.6GT/s QPI 40× PCIe 3.0	4× DDR4-2133	120W	$1745
Up to 2× LGA 2011-v3	Xeon E5	2670 v3	12 (24)	30MB	2.3 GHz	3.1 GHz	2× 9.6GT/s QPI 40× PCIe 3.0	4× DDR4-2133	120W	$1589
Up to 2× LGA 2011-v3	Xeon E5	2658 v3	12 (24)	30MB	2.2 GHz	2.9 GHz	2× 9.6GT/s QPI 40× PCIe 3.0	4× DDR4-2133	105W	$1832
Up to 2× LGA 2011-v3	Xeon E5	2650L v3	12 (24)	30MB	1.8 GHz	2.5 GHz	2× 9.6GT/s QPI 40× PCIe 3.0	4× DDR4-2133	65W	$1329
Up to 2× LGA 2011-v3	Xeon E5	2648L v3	12 (24)	30MB	1.8 GHz	2.5 GHz	2× 9.6GT/s QPI 40× PCIe 3.0	4× DDR4-2133	75W	$1544
Up to 2× LGA 2011-v3	Xeon E5	2687W v3	10 (20)	25MB	3.1 GHz	3.5 GHz	2× 9.6GT/s QPI 40× PCIe 3.0	4× DDR4-2133	160W	$2141
Up to 2× LGA 2011-v3	Xeon E5	2660 v3	10 (20)	25MB	2.6 GHz	3.3 GHz	2× 9.6GT/s QPI 40× PCIe 3.0	4× DDR4-2133	105W	$1445
Up to 2× LGA 2011-v3	Xeon E5	2650 v3	10 (20)	25MB	2.3 GHz	3.0 GHz	2× 9.6GT/s QPI 40× PCIe 3.0	4× DDR4-2133	105W	$1166
Up to 2× LGA 2011-v3	Xeon E5	2628L v3	10 (20)	25MB	2.0 GHz	2.5 GHz	2× 9.6GT/s QPI 40× PCIe 3.0	4× DDR4-1866	75W	$1364
Up to 2× LGA 2011-v3	Xeon E5	2640 v3	8 (16)	25MB	2.6 GHz	3.4 GHz	2× 8.0GT/s QPI 40× PCIe 3.0	4× DDR4-1866	90W	$939
Up to 2× LGA 2011-v3	Xeon E5	2630 v3	8 (16)	25MB	2.4 GHz	3.2 GHz	2× 8.0GT/s QPI 40× PCIe 3.0	4× DDR4-1866	85W	$667
Up to 2× LGA 2011-v3	Xeon E5	2630L v3	8 (16)	25MB	1.8 GHz	2.9 GHz	2× 8.0GT/s QPI 40× PCIe 3.0	4× DDR4-1866	55W	$612
Up to 2× LGA 2011-v3	Xeon E5	2618L v3	8 (16)	25MB	2.3 GHz	3.4 GHz	2× 8.0GT/s QPI 40× PCIe 3.0	4× DDR4-1866	75W	$779
Up to 2× LGA 2011-v3	Xeon E5	2620 v3	6 (12)	15MB	2.4 GHz	3.2 GHz	2× 8.0GT/s QPI 40× PCIe 3.0	4× DDR4-1866	85W	$417
Up to 2× LGA 2011-v3	Xeon E5	2608L v3	6 (12)	15MB	2.0 GHz	N/A	2× 6.4GT/s QPI 40× PCIe 3.0	4× DDR4-1866	85W	$441
Up to 2× LGA 2011-v3	Xeon E5	2609 v3	6 (6)	15MB	1.9 GHz	N/A	2× 6.4GT/s QPI 40× PCIe 3.0	4× DDR4-1600	85W	$306
Up to 2× LGA 2011-v3	Xeon E5	2603 v3	6 (6)	15MB	1.6 GHz	N/A	2× 6.4GT/s QPI 40× PCIe 3.0	4× DDR4-1600	85W	$213
LGA 2011-v3	Xeon E5	1680 v3	8 (16)	20MB	3.2 GHz	3.8 GHz	40× PCIe 3.0	4× DDR4-2133	140W	$1723
LGA 2011-v3	Xeon E5	1660 v3	8 (16)	20MB	3.0 GHz	3.5 GHz	40× PCIe 3.0	4× DDR4-2133	140W	$1080
LGA 2011-v3	Xeon E5	1650 v3	6 (12)	15MB	3.5 GHz	3.8 GHz	40× PCIe 3.0	4× DDR4-2133	140W	$583
LGA 2011-v3	Xeon E5	1630 v3	4 (8)	10MB	3.7 GHz	3.8 GHz	40× PCIe 3.0	4× DDR4-2133	140W	$372
LGA 2011-v3	Xeon E5	1620 v3	4 (8)	10MB	3.5 GHz	3.6 GHz	40× PCIe 3.0	4× DDR4-2133	140W	$294
LGA 2011-v3	Xeon E5	1607 v3	4 (4)	10MB	3.1 GHz	N/A	40× PCIe 3.0	4× DDR4-1866	140W	$225
LGA 2011-v3	Xeon E5	1603 v3	4 (4)	10MB	2.8 GHz	N/A	40× PCIe 3.0	4× DDR4-1866	140W	$202

High Frequency Optimized
Socket	Model		Cores (threads)	L3 Cache	CPU clock rate		Interface	Supported memory	TDP	Price (USD)
Socket	Model		Cores (threads)	L3 Cache	Base	Turbo	Interface	Supported memory	TDP	Price (USD)
Up to 2× LGA 2011-v3	Xeon E5	2667 v3	8 (16)	20 MB	3.2 GHz	3.6 GHz	2× 9.6GT/s QPI 40× PCIe 3.0	4× DDR4-2133	135W	$2057
Up to 2× LGA 2011-v3	Xeon E5	2643 v3	6 (12)	20 MB	3.4 GHz	3.7 GHz	2× 9.6GT/s QPI 40× PCIe 3.0	4× DDR4-2133	135W	$1552
Up to 2× LGA 2011-v3	Xeon E5	2637 v3	4 (8)	15 MB	3.5 GHz	3.7 GHz	2× 9.6GT/s QPI 40× PCIe 3.0	4× DDR4-2133	135W	$996
Up to 2× LGA 2011-v3	Xeon E5	2623 v3	4 (8)	10 MB	3.0 GHz	3.5 GHz	2× 8.0GT/s QPI	4× DDR4-1866	105W	$444

OEM
Socket	Model		Cores (threads)	L3 Cache	CPU clock rate		Interface	Supported memory	TDP	Release date	Known Client
Socket	Model		Cores (threads)	L3 Cache	Base	Turbo	Interface	Supported memory	TDP	Release date	Known Client
Up to 2× LGA 2011-v3	Xeon E5	2696 v3	18 (36)	45MB	2.3 GHz	3.8 GHz	2× 9.6GT/s QPI 40× PCIe 3.0	4× DDR4-2133	145W	2014-09-08	–
Up to 2× LGA 2011-v3	Xeon E5	2686 v3	18 (36)	45MB	2.0 GHz	3.5 GHz	2× 9.6GT/s QPI 40× PCIe 3.0	4× DDR4-2133	120W	2014-09-08	–
Up to 2× LGA 2011-v3	Xeon E5	2698A v3	16 (32)	40MB	2.8 GHz	3.2 GHz	2× 9.6GT/s QPI 40× PCIe 3.0	4× DDR4-2133	165W	2014-11-18	Lenovo
Up to 2× LGA 2011-v3	Xeon E5	2698B v3	16 (32)	40MB	2.0 GHz	3.4 GHz	2× 9.6GT/s QPI 40× PCIe 3.0	4× DDR4-2133	135W	2015-01	Microsoft
Up to 2× LGA 2011-v3	Xeon E5	2675 v3	16 (32)	40MB	1.8 GHz	2.3 GHz	2× 9.6GT/s QPI 40× PCIe 3.0	4× DDR4-2133	110W	2014-09-08	–
Up to 2× LGA 2011-v3	Xeon E5	2692 v3	12 (24)	30MB	3.0 GHz	3.6 GHz	2× 9.6GT/s QPI 40× PCIe 3.0	4× DDR4-2133	165W	2014-09-08	Microsoft
Up to 2× LGA 2011-v3	Xeon E5	2678 v3	12 (24)	30MB	2.5 GHz	3.3 GHz	2× 9.6GT/s QPI 40× PCIe 3.0	4× DDR4-2133	120W	2015-06	–
Up to 2× LGA 2011-v3	Xeon E5	2676 v3	12 (24)	30MB	2.4 GHz	3.1 GHz	2× 9.6GT/s QPI 40× PCIe 3.0	4× DDR4-2133	120W	2015-06	Amazon
Up to 2× LGA 2011-v3	Xeon E5	2673 v3	12 (24)	30MB	2.4 GHz	3.1 GHz	2× 9.6GT/s QPI 40× PCIe 3.0	4× DDR4-2133	105W	2014-09-08	Microsoft
Up to 2× LGA 2011-v3	Xeon E5	2669 v3	12 (24)	30MB	2.3 GHz	3.1 GHz	2× 9.6GT/s QPI 40× PCIe 3.0	4× DDR4-2133	120W	2014-09-08	–
Up to 2× LGA 2011-v3	Xeon E5	2666 v3	10 (20)	25MB	2.9 GHz	3.5 GHz	2× 9.6GT/s QPI 40× PCIe 3.0	4× DDR4-2133	135W	2014-11-13	Amazon
Up to 2× LGA 2011-v3	Xeon E5	2652 v3	10 (20)	25MB	2.3 GHz	2.8 GHz	2× 9.6GT/s QPI 40× PCIe 3.0	4× DDR4-2133	105W	2014-09-08	–
Up to 2× LGA 2011-v3	Xeon E5	2649 v3	10 (20)	25MB	2.3 GHz	3.0 GHz	2× 9.6GT/s QPI 40× PCIe 3.0	4× DDR4-2133	105W	2014-09-08	–
Up to 2× LGA 2011-v3	Xeon E5	2663 v3	10 (10)	25MB	2.8 GHz	3.5 GHz	2× 9.6GT/s QPI 40× PCIe 3.0	4× DDR4-2133	105W	2014-09-08	–
Up to 2× LGA 2011-v3	Xeon E5	2628 v3	8 (16)	20MB	2.5 GHz	3.0 GHz	2× 9.6GT/s QPI 40× PCIe 3.0	4× DDR4-2133	85W	2014-09-08	–
Up to 2× LGA 2011-v3	Xeon E5	2629 v3	8 (16)	20MB	2.4 GHz	3.2 GHz	2× 8.0GT/s QPI 40× PCIe 3.0	4× DDR4-1866	85W	2014-09-08	–
Up to 2× LGA 2011-v3	Xeon E5	2622 v3	8 (16)	20MB	2.4 GHz	3.4 GHz	2× 8.0GT/s QPI 40× PCIe 3.0	4× DDR4-1866	85W	2014-09-08	–
LGA 2011-v3	Xeon E5	1691 v3	14 (28)	35MB	2.5 GHz	3.4 GHz	40× PCIe 3.0	4× DDR4-2133	135W	2014-09-08	–
LGA 2011-v3	Xeon E5	1686 v3	12 (24)	30MB	2.6 GHz	3.2 GHz	40× PCIe 3.0	4× DDR4-2133	135W	2014-09-08	–
LGA 2011-v3	Xeon E5	1681 v3	10 (20)	25MB	2.9 GHz	3.5 GHz	40× PCIe 3.0	4× DDR4-2133	135W	2014-09-08	–

==== Haswell-EX (Xeon E7 v3) ====
Socket LGA 2011-1 is used for Ivy Bridge-EX (Xeon E7 v2) and Haswell-EX (Xeon E7 V3) CPUs, which were released in February 2014 and May 2015, respectively. All processors are released on May 6, 2015, unless noted otherwise.

Socket	Model		Cores (threads)	L3 Cache	CPU clock rate		Interface	Supported memory	TDP	Price (USD)
Socket	Model		Cores (threads)	L3 Cache	Base	Turbo	Interface	Supported memory	TDP	Price (USD)
Up to 8× LGA 2011-1	Xeon E7	8895 v3	18 (36)	45MB	2.6 GHz	3.5 GHz	3× 9.6GT/s QPI 32× PCIe 3.0	4× DDR4-1866 / 4x DDR3-1600	175W	Oracle OEM
Up to 8× LGA 2011-1	Xeon E7	8890 v3	18 (36)	45MB	2.5 GHz	3.3 GHz	3× 9.6GT/s QPI 32× PCIe 3.0	4× DDR4-1866 / 4x DDR3-1600	165W	$7174
Up to 8× LGA 2011-1	Xeon E7	8880 v3	18 (36)	45MB	2.3 GHz	3.1 GHz	3× 9.6GT/s QPI 32× PCIe 3.0	4× DDR4-1866 / 4x DDR3-1600	140W	$6063
Up to 8× LGA 2011-1	Xeon E7	8870 v3	18 (36)	45MB	2.1 GHz	2.9 GHz	3× 9.6GT/s QPI 32× PCIe 3.0	4× DDR4-1866 / 4x DDR3-1600	140W	$5895
Up to 8× LGA 2011-1	Xeon E7	8880L v3	18 (36)	45MB	2.0 GHz	2.8 GHz	3× 9.6GT/s QPI 32× PCIe 3.0	4× DDR4-1866 / 4x DDR3-1600	115W	$4672
Up to 8× LGA 2011-1	Xeon E7	8867 v3	16 (32)	45MB	2.5 GHz	3.3 GHz	3× 9.6GT/s QPI 32× PCIe 3.0	4× DDR4-1866 / 4x DDR3-1600	165W	$4672
Up to 8× LGA 2011-1	Xeon E7	8860 v3	16 (32)	40MB	2.2 GHz	3.2 GHz	3× 9.6GT/s QPI 32× PCIe 3.0	4× DDR4-1866 / 4x DDR3-1600	140W	$4061
Up to 8× LGA 2011-1	Xeon E7	8891 v3	10 (20)	45MB	2.8 GHz	3.5 GHz	3× 9.6GT/s QPI 32× PCIe 3.0	4× DDR4-1866 / 4x DDR3-1600	165W	$6841
Up to 8× LGA 2011-1	Xeon E7	8893 v3	4 (8)	45MB	3.2 GHz	3.5 GHz	3× 9.6GT/s QPI 32× PCIe 3.0	4× DDR4-1866 / 4x DDR3-1600	140W	$6841
Up to 4× LGA 2011-v3	Xeon E7	4850 v3	14 (28)	35MB	2.2 GHz	2.8 GHz	3× 8.0GT/s QPI 32× PCIe 3.0	4× DDR4-1866 / 4x DDR3-1600	115W	$3003
Up to 4× LGA 2011-v3	Xeon E7	4830 v3	12 (24)	30MB	2.1 GHz	2.7 GHz	3× 8.0GT/s QPI 32× PCIe 3.0	4× DDR4-1866 / 4x DDR3-1600	115W	$2170
Up to 4× LGA 2011-v3	Xeon E7	4820 v3	10 (20)	25MB	1.9 GHz	N/A	3× 6.4GT/s QPI 32× PCIe 3.0	4× DDR4-1866 / 4x DDR3-1600	115W	$1502
Up to 4× LGA 2011-v3	Xeon E7	4809 v3	8 (16)	20MB	2.0 GHz	N/A	3× 6.4GT/s QPI 32× PCIe 3.0	4× DDR4-1866 / 4x DDR3-1600	115W	$1223

==== Broadwell-EP (Xeon E5 v4) ====
Server processors for the LGA 2011-v3 socket are listed in the tables below. These processors are built on Broadwell-E architecture, 14nM lithography, 4-channel DDR4 ECC with up to 1.5TB and 40-lanes of PCI Express 3.0. E5-16xx v4 do not have QPI links. E5-26xx v4 and E5-46xx v4 processors have 2 QPI links.

Socket	Model		Cores (threads)	L3 Cache	CPU clock rate		Interface	Supported memory	TDP	Price (USD)
Socket	Model		Cores (threads)	L3 Cache	Base	Turbo	Interface	Supported memory	TDP	Price (USD)
Up to 4× LGA 2011-v3	Xeon E5	4669 v4	22 (44)	55MB	2.2 GHz	3.0 GHz	2× 9.6GT/s QPI 40× PCIe 3.0	4× DDR4	135W	$7007
Up to 4× LGA 2011-v3	Xeon E5	4667 v4	18 (36)	45MB	2.2 GHz	3.0 GHz	2× 9.6GT/s QPI 40× PCIe 3.0	4× DDR4	135W	$5729
Up to 4× LGA 2011-v3	Xeon E5	4660 v4	16 (32)	40MB	2.2 GHz	3.0 GHz	2× 9.6GT/s QPI 40× PCIe 3.0	4× DDR4	120W	$4727
Up to 4× LGA 2011-v3	Xeon E5	4650 v4	14 (28)	35MB	2.2 GHz	2.8 GHz	2× 9.6GT/s QPI 40× PCIe 3.0	4× DDR4	105W	$3838
Up to 4× LGA 2011-v3	Xeon E5	4655 v4	8 (16)	30MB	2.5 GHz	3.2 GHz	2× 9.6GT/s QPI 40× PCIe 3.0	4× DDR4	135W	$4616
Up to 4× LGA 2011-v3	Xeon E5	4628L v4	14 (28)	35MB	1.8 GHz	2.2 GHz	2× 8.0GT/s QPI 40× PCIe 3.0	4× DDR4	75W	$2535
Up to 4× LGA 2011-v3	Xeon E5	4640 v4	12 (24)	30MB	2.1 GHz	2.6 GHz	2× 8.0GT/s QPI 40× PCIe 3.0	4× DDR4	105W	$2837
Up to 4× LGA 2011-v3	Xeon E5	4620 v4	10 (20)	25MB	2.1 GHz	2.6 GHz	2× 8.0GT/s QPI 40× PCIe 3.0	4× DDR4	105W	$1668
Up to 4× LGA 2011-v3	Xeon E5	4627 v4	10 (20)	25MB	1.8 GHz	N/A	2× 6.4GT/s QPI	4× DDR4	105W	$1219
Up to 4× LGA 2011-v3	Xeon E5	4627 v4	10 (10)	25MB	2.6 GHz	3.2 GHz	2× 8.0GT/s QPI	4× DDR4	135W	$2225
Up to 2× LGA 2011-v3	Xeon E5	2699A v4	22 (44)	55MB	2.4 GHz	3.6 GHz	2× 9.6GT/s QPI 40× PCIe 3.0	4× DDR4-2400	145W	$4938
Up to 2× LGA 2011-v3	Xeon E5	2699 v4	22 (44)	55MB	2.2 GHz	3.6 GHz	2× 9.6GT/s QPI 40× PCIe 3.0	4× DDR4-2400	145W	$4115
Up to 2× LGA 2011-v3	Xeon E5	2699R v4	22 (44)	55MB	2.2 GHz	3.6 GHz	2× 9.6GT/s QPI 40× PCIe 3.0	4× DDR4-2400	145W	$4560
Up to 2× LGA 2011-v3	Xeon E5	2698 v4	20 (40)	50MB	2.2 GHz	3.6 GHz	2× 9.6GT/s QPI 40× PCIe 3.0	4× DDR4-2400	135W	$3226
Up to 2× LGA 2011-v3	Xeon E5	2697 v4	18 (36)	45MB	2.3 GHz	3.6 GHz	2× 9.6GT/s QPI 40× PCIe 3.0	4× DDR4-2400	145W	$2702
Up to 2× LGA 2011-v3	Xeon E5	2695 v4	18 (36)	45MB	2.1 GHz	3.3 GHz	2× 9.6GT/s QPI 40× PCIe 3.0	4× DDR4-2400	120W	$2424
Up to 2× LGA 2011-v3	Xeon E5	2697A v4	16 (32)	40MB	2.6 GHz	3.6 GHz	2× 9.6GT/s QPI 40× PCIe 3.0	4× DDR4-2400	145W	$2891
Up to 2× LGA 2011-v3	Xeon E5	2683 v4	16 (32)	40MB	2.1 GHz	3.0 GHz	2× 9.6GT/s QPI 40× PCIe 3.0	4× DDR4-2400	120W	$1846
Up to 2× LGA 2011-v3	Xeon E5	2690 v4	14 (28)	35MB	2.6 GHz	3.5 GHz	2× 9.6GT/s QPI 40× PCIe 3.0	4× DDR4-2400	135W	$2090
Up to 2× LGA 2011-v3	Xeon E5	2680 v4	14 (28)	35MB	2.4 GHz	3.3 GHz	2× 9.6GT/s QPI 40× PCIe 3.0	4× DDR4-2400	120W	$1745
Up to 2× LGA 2011-v3	Xeon E5	2660 v4	14 (28)	35MB	2.0 GHz	3.2 GHz	2× 9.6GT/s QPI 40× PCIe 3.0	4× DDR4-2400	105W	$1445
Up to 2× LGA 2011-v3	Xeon E5	2658 v4	14 (28)	35MB	2.3 GHz	2.8 GHz	2× 9.6GT/s QPI 40× PCIe 3.0	4× DDR4-2400	105W	$1832
Up to 2× LGA 2011-v3	Xeon E5	2648L v4	14 (28)	35MB	1.8 GHz	2.5 GHz	2× 9.6GT/s QPI 40× PCIe 3.0	4× DDR4-2400	75W	$1544
Up to 2× LGA 2011-v3	Xeon E5	2650L v4	14 (28)	35MB	1.7 GHz	2.5 GHz	2× 9.6GT/s QPI 40× PCIe 3.0	4× DDR4-2400	65W	$1329
Up to 2× LGA 2011-v3	Xeon E5	2687W v4	12 (24)	30MB	3.0 GHz	3.5 GHz	2× 9.6GT/s QPI 40× PCIe 3.0	4× DDR4-2400	160W	$2141
Up to 2× LGA 2011-v3	Xeon E5	2650 v4	12 (24)	30MB	2.2 GHz	2.9 GHz	2× 9.6GT/s QPI 40× PCIe 3.0	4× DDR4-2400	105W	$1166
Up to 2× LGA 2011-v3	Xeon E5	2628L v4	12 (24)	30MB	1.9 GHz	2.4 GHz	2× 8.0GT/s QPI 40× PCIe 3.0	4× DDR4-2133	75W	$1364
Up to 2× LGA 2011-v3	Xeon E5	2640 v4	10 (20)	25MB	2.4 GHz	3.4 GHz	2× 8.0GT/s QPI 40× PCIe 3.0	4× DDR4-2133	90W	$939
Up to 2× LGA 2011-v3	Xeon E5	2630 v4	10 (20)	25MB	2.2 GHz	3.1 GHz	2× 8.0GT/s QPI 40× PCIe 3.0	4× DDR4-2133	85W	$667
Up to 2× LGA 2011-v3	Xeon E5	2618L v4	10 (20)	25MB	2.2 GHz	3.2 GHz	2× 8.0GT/s QPI 40× PCIe 3.0	4× DDR4-2133	75W	$779
Up to 2× LGA 2011-v3	Xeon E5	2630L v4	10 (20)	25MB	1.8 GHz	2.9 GHz	2× 8.0GT/s QPI 40× PCIe 3.0	4× DDR4-2133	55W	$612
Up to 2× LGA 2011-v3	Xeon E5	2620 v4	8 (16)	20MB	2.1 GHz	3.0 GHz	2× 8.0GT/s QPI 40× PCIe 3.0	4× DDR4-2133	85W	$417
Up to 2× LGA 2011-v3	Xeon E5	2608L v4	8 (16)	20MB	1.6 GHz	1.7 GHz	2× 6.4GT/s QPI 40× PCIe 3.0	4× DDR4-1866	50W	$363
Up to 2× LGA 2011-v3	Xeon E5	2609 v4	8 (8)	20MB	1.7 GHz	N/A	2× 6.4GT/s QPI 40× PCIe 3.0	4× DDR4-1866	85W	$306
Up to 2× LGA 2011-v3	Xeon E5	2603 v4	6 (6)	15MB	1.7 GHz	N/A	2× 6.4GT/s QPI 40× PCIe 3.0	4× DDR4-1866	85W	$213
Up to 2× LGA 2011-v3	Xeon E5	2623 v4	4 (8)	10MB	2.6 GHz	3.2 GHz	2× 8.0GT/s QPI	4× DDR4-2133	85W	$444
LGA 2011-v3	Xeon E5	1680 v4	8 (16)	20MB	3.4 GHz	4.0 GHz	40× PCIe 3.0	4× DDR4-2400	140W	$1723
LGA 2011-v3	Xeon E5	1660 v4	8 (16)	20MB	3.2 GHz	3.8 GHz	40× PCIe 3.0	4× DDR4-2400	140W	$1113
LGA 2011-v3	Xeon E5	1650 v4	6 (12)	15MB	3.6 GHz	4.0 GHz	40× PCIe 3.0	4× DDR4-2400	140W	$617
LGA 2011-v3	Xeon E5	1630 v4	4 (8)	10MB	3.7 GHz	4.0 GHz	40× PCIe 3.0	4× DDR4-2400	140W	$406
LGA 2011-v3	Xeon E5	1620 v4	4 (8)	10MB	3.5 GHz	3.8 GHz	40× PCIe 3.0	4× DDR4-2400	140W	$294

High Frequency Optimized
Socket	Model		Cores (threads)	L3 Cache	CPU clock rate		Interface	Supported memory	TDP	Price (USD)
Socket	Model		Cores (threads)	L3 Cache	Base	Turbo	Interface	Supported memory	TDP	Price (USD)
Up to 2× LGA 2011-v3	Xeon E5	2689 v4	10 (20)	25 MB	3.1 GHz	3.8 GHz	2× 9.6GT/s QPI 40× PCIe 3.0	4× DDR4-2400	165W	$2723
Up to 2× LGA 2011-v3	Xeon E5	2667 v4	8 (16)	25 MB	3.2 GHz	3.6 GHz	2× 9.6GT/s QPI 40× PCIe 3.0	4× DDR4-2400	135W	$2057
Up to 2× LGA 2011-v3	Xeon E5	2643 v4	6 (12)	20 MB	3.4 GHz	3.7 GHz	2× 9.6GT/s QPI 40× PCIe 3.0	4× DDR4-2400	135W	$1552
Up to 2× LGA 2011-v3	Xeon E5	2637 v4	4 (8)	15 MB	3.5 GHz	3.7 GHz	2× 9.6GT/s QPI 40× PCIe 3.0	4× DDR4-2400	135W	$996

OEM
Socket	Model		Cores (threads)	L3 Cache	CPU clock rate		Interface	Supported memory	TDP	Known Client
Socket	Model		Cores (threads)	L3 Cache	Base	Turbo	Interface	Supported memory	TDP	Known Client
Up to 2× LGA 2011-v3	Xeon E5	2699P v4	22 (44)	55MB	3.0 GHz	3.6 GHz	2× 9.6GT/s QPI 40× PCIe 3.0		300W	
Up to 2× LGA 2011-v3	Xeon E5	2699C v4	22 (44)	55MB	2.2 GHz	2.4 GHz	2× 9.6GT/s QPI 40× PCIe 3.0	4× DDR4-1600/1866/2133/2400	145W	
Up to 2× LGA 2011-v3	Xeon E5	2696 v4	22 (44)	55MB	2.2 GHz	3.7 GHz?	2× 9.6GT/s QPI 40× PCIe 3.0	4× DDR4-1600/1866/2133/2400	150W?	
Up to 2× LGA 2011-v3	Xeon E5	2679 v4	20 (40)	50MB	2.5 GHz	3.3 GHz	2× 9.6GT/s QPI 40× PCIe 3.0	4× DDR4-1600/1866/2133/2400	145W	
Up to 2× LGA 2011-v3	Xeon E5	2673 v4	20 (40)	50MB	2.3 GHz	3.3 GHz	2× 9.6GT/s QPI 40× PCIe 3.0	4× DDR4-1600/1866/2133/2400	135W?	
Up to 2× LGA 2011-v3	Xeon E5	2686 v4	18 (36)	45MB	2.3 GHz	3.0 GHz	2× 9.6GT/s QPI 40× PCIe 3.0	4× DDR4-1600/1866/2133/2400	145W	
Up to 2× LGA 2011-v3	Xeon E5	2682 v4	16 (32)	40MB	2.5 GHz	3.0 GHz	2× 9.6GT/s QPI 40× PCIe 3.0	4× DDR4-1600/1866/2133/2400	120W	
Up to 2× LGA 2011-v3	Xeon E5	2676 v4	16 (32)	40MB	2.4 GHz	3.0 GHz	2× 9.6GT/s QPI 40× PCIe 3.0	4× DDR4-1600/1866/2133/2400	145W	
Up to 2× LGA 2011-v3	Xeon E5	AWS-1100	16 (32)	40MB	2.4 GHz	3.0 GHz	2× 9.6GT/s QPI 40× PCIe 3.0	4× DDR4-1600/1866/2133/2400	145W	Amazon
Up to 2× LGA 2011-v3	Xeon E5	2666 v4	12 (24)	30MB	2.8 GHz	3.4 GHz	2× 9.6GT/s QPI 40× PCIe 3.0	4× DDR4-1600/1866/2133/2400	145W	Amazon
Up to 2× LGA 2011-v3	Xeon E5	2689A v4	8 (16)	20MB	3.4 GHz	3.6 GHz	2× 9.6GT/s QPI 40× PCIe 3.0	4× DDR4-1600/1866/2133/2400	145W	
Upto 1x LGA 2011-v3	Xeon E5	1607 v4	4 (4)	10 MB	3.1 GHz	N/A	40× PCIe 3.0	4× DDR4-1600/1866/2133	140 W	
Upto 1x LGA 2011-v3	Xeon E5	1603 v4	4 (4)	10 MB	2.8 GHz	N/A	40× PCIe 3.0	4× DDR4-1600/1866/2133	140 W	

==== Broadwell-EX (Xeon E7 v4) ====
Socket	Model		Cores (threads)	L3 Cache	CPU clock rate		Interface	Supported memory	TDP	Release date	Price (USD)
Socket	Model		Cores (threads)	L3 Cache	Base	Turbo	Interface	Supported memory	TDP	Release date	Price (USD)
Up to 8× LGA 2011-1	Xeon E7	8894 v4	24	60MB	2.4 GHz	3.4 GHz	3× 9.6 GT/s QPI 32× PCIe 3.0	4× DDR4-1866 / 4x DDR3-1600	165W	February 9, 2017	$8898
Up to 8× LGA 2011-1	Xeon E7	8890 v4	24	60MB	2.2 GHz	3.4 GHz	3× 9.6 GT/s QPI 32× PCIe 3.0	4× DDR4-1866 / 4x DDR3-1600	165W	June 6, 2016	$7174
Up to 8× LGA 2011-1	Xeon E7	8880 v4	22	55MB	2.2 GHz	3.3 GHz	3× 9.6 GT/s QPI 32× PCIe 3.0	4× DDR4-1866 / 4x DDR3-1600	150W	June 6, 2016	$5895
Up to 8× LGA 2011-1	Xeon E7	8870 v4	20	50MB	2.1 GHz	3.0 GHz	3× 9.6 GT/s QPI 32× PCIe 3.0	4× DDR4-1866 / 4x DDR3-1600	140W	June 6, 2016	$4672
Up to 8× LGA 2011-1	Xeon E7	8860 v4	18	45MB	2.2 GHz	3.2 GHz	3× 9.6 GT/s QPI 32× PCIe 3.0	4× DDR4-1866 / 4x DDR3-1600	140W	June 6, 2016	$4061
Up to 8× LGA 2011-1	Xeon E7	8867 v4	18	45MB	2.4 GHz	3.3 GHz	3× 9.6 GT/s QPI 32× PCIe 3.0	4× DDR4-1866 / 4x DDR3-1600	165W	June 6, 2016	$4672
Up to 8× LGA 2011-1	Xeon E7	8891 v4	10	60MB	2.8 GHz	3.5 GHz	3× 9.6 GT/s QPI 32× PCIe 3.0	4× DDR4-1866 / 4x DDR3-1600	165W	June 6, 2016	$6841
Up to 8× LGA 2011-1	Xeon E7	8893 v4	4	60MB	3.2 GHz	3.5 GHz	3× 9.6 GT/s QPI 32× PCIe 3.0	4× DDR4-1866 / 4x DDR3-1600	140W	June 6, 2016	$6841
Up to 4× LGA 2011-1	Xeon E7	4850 v4	16	40MB	2.1 GHz	2.8 GHz	3× 8.0 GT/s QPI 32× PCIe 3.0	4× DDR4-1866 / 4x DDR3-1600	115W	June 6, 2016	$3003
Up to 4× LGA 2011-1	Xeon E7	4830 v4	14	35MB	2 GHz	2.8 GHz	3× 8.0 GT/s QPI 32× PCIe 3.0	4× DDR4-1866 / 4x DDR3-1600	115W	June 6, 2016	$2170
Up to 4× LGA 2011-1	Xeon E7	4820 v4	10	25MB	2 GHz	N/A	3× 6.4 GT/s QPI	4× DDR4-1866 / 4x DDR3-1600	115W	June 6, 2016	$1502
