= LGA 1155 =

Intel CPU socket

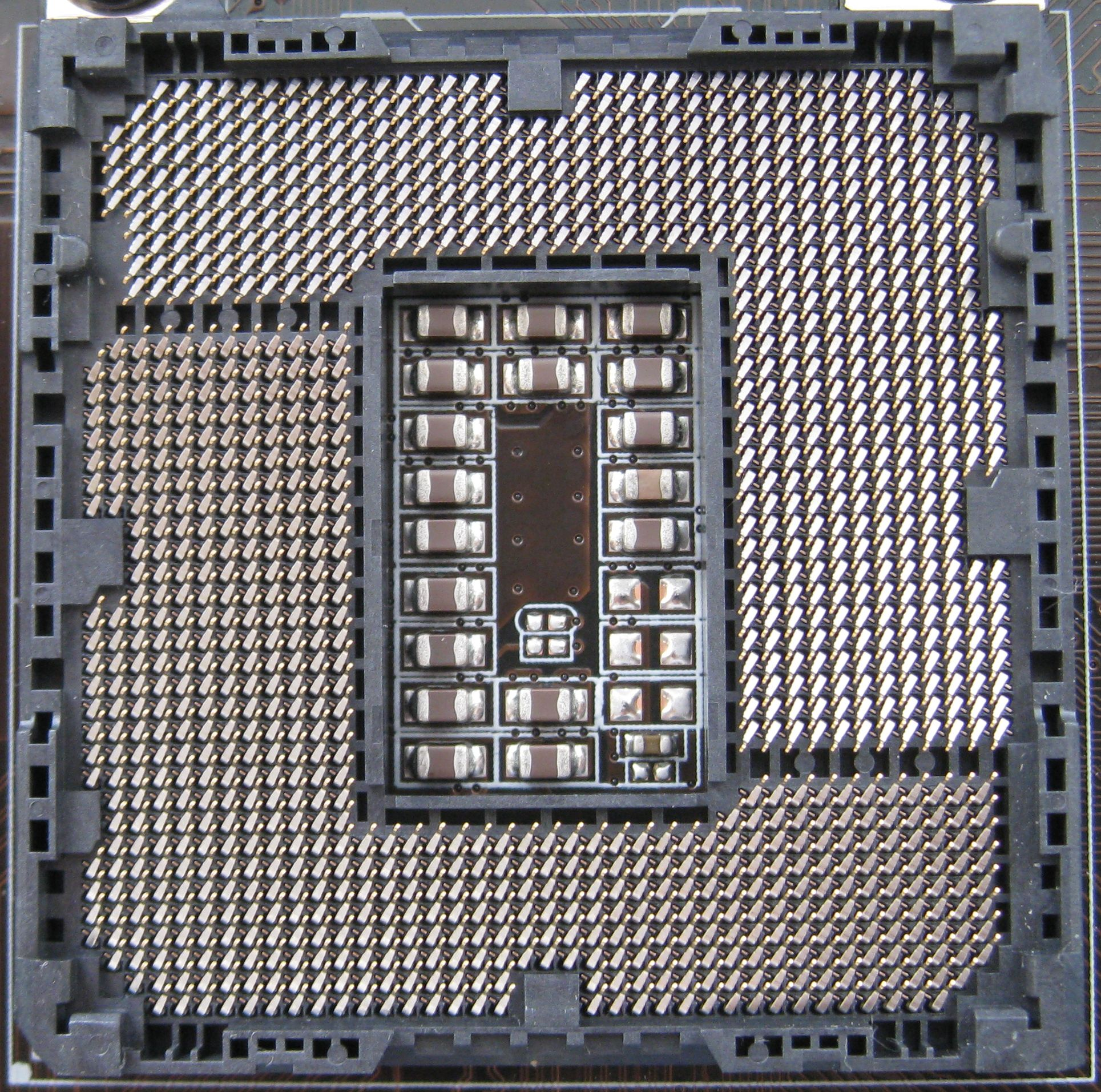
- Release date: 2011
- Type: LGA-ZIF
- Chip form factors: Flip-chip
- Contacts: 1155
- FSB protocol: PCI Express
- Processor dimensions: 37.5 × 37.5mm 1,406.25mm^{2}
- Processors: Sandy Bridge; Ivy Bridge
- Predecessor: LGA 1156
- Successor: LGA 1150
- Memory support: DDR3
- This article is part of the CPU socket series

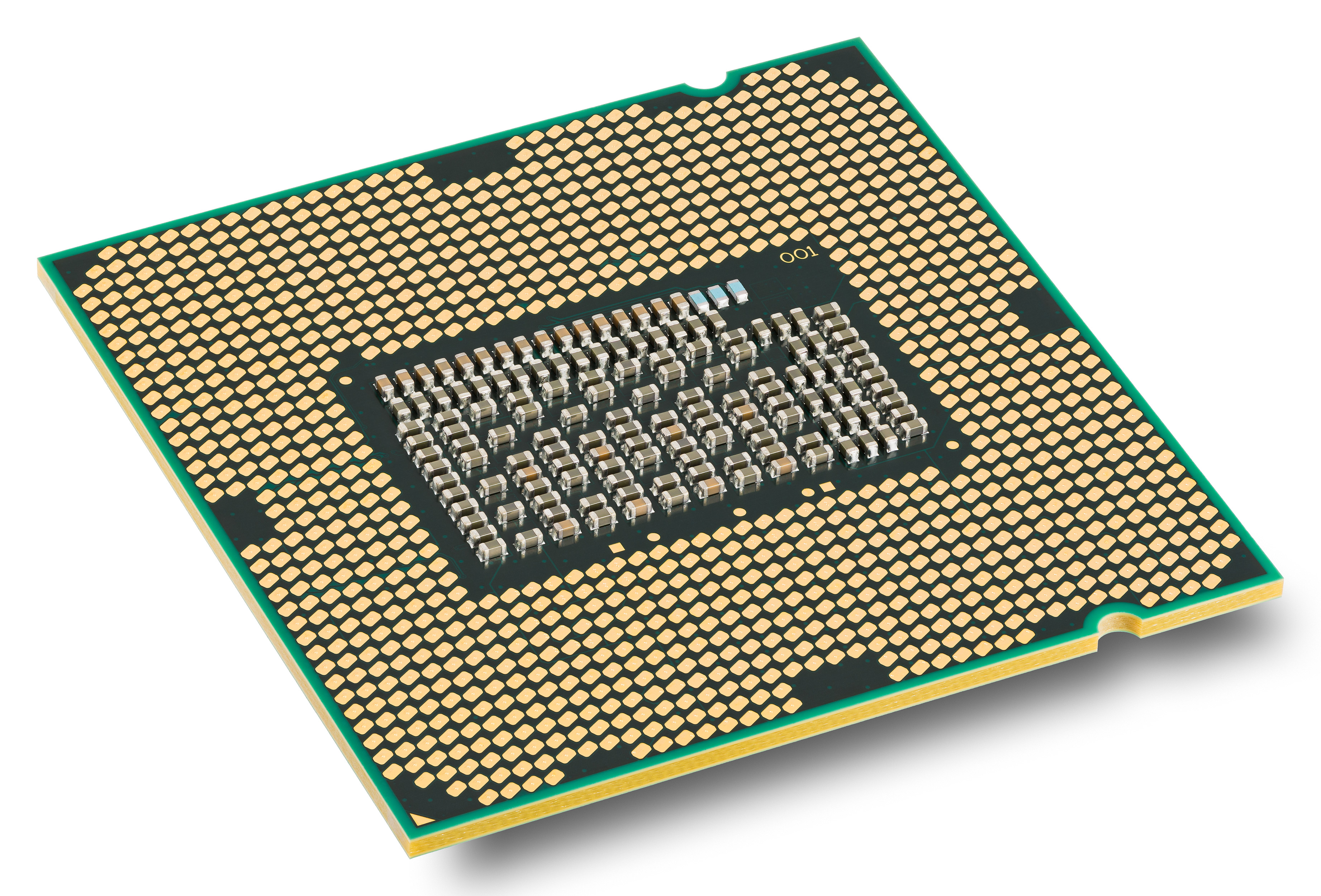
View of the socket LGA 1155 on an Intel Core i7 Sandy Bridge 2600K model CPU

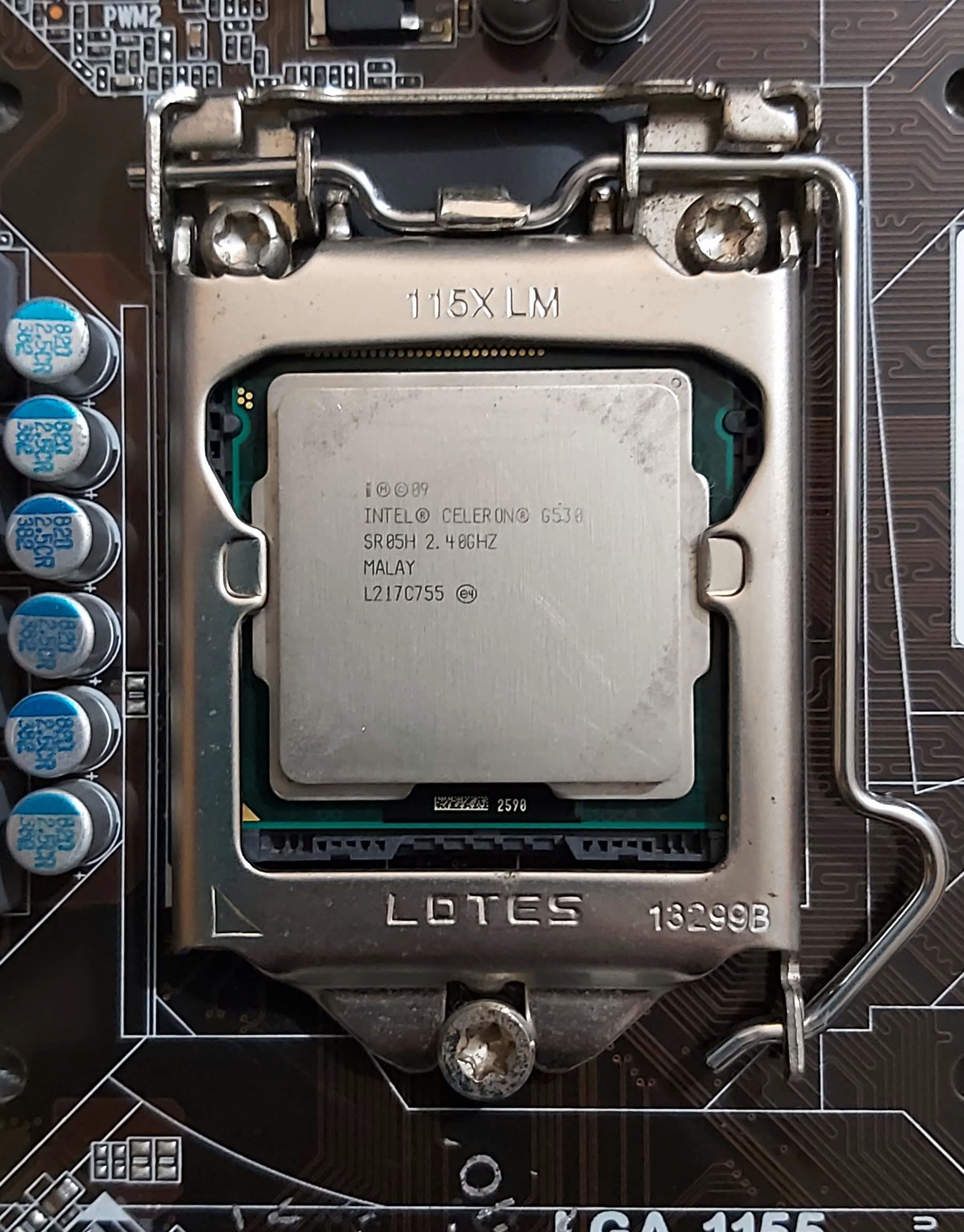
Celeron G530 "Sandy Bridge" installed on a Socket 1155

LGA 1155, also called Socket H2, is a zero insertion force flip-chip land grid array (LGA) CPU socket designed by Intel for their CPUs based on the Sandy Bridge (second generation core) and Ivy Bridge (third generation) microarchitectures.

Introduced in 2011, it is the successor of LGA 1156 (known as Socket H) and was itself succeeded by LGA 1150 in 2013. Along with selected variations of LGA 2011 socket, as well as LGA 1356, it is the last Intel socket to fully support Windows XP, Windows Server 2003, Windows Vista, and Windows Server 2008.

LGA 1155 has 1155 protruding pins to make contact with the pads on the processor. The pins are arranged in a 40×40 array with a 24×16 central void and additional 61 omitted pins (two adjoining the central void, six in each of the four corners, and 35 in groups around the perimeter), yielding the 1600 − 384 − 61 = 1155 pin count. Processors for LGA 1155 and LGA 1156 sockets are not compatible with each other since they have different socket notches.

LGA 1155 also marked the beginning of UEFI secure boot with support in some later boards.

== Heatsink ==
The four holes for fastening the heatsink to the motherboard are placed in a square with a lateral length of 75mm for Intel's sockets LGA 1156, LGA 1155, LGA 1150, LGA 1151 and LGA 1200. Cooling solutions should therefore be interchangeable.

Cooling systems are compatible between LGA 1155 and LGA 1156 sockets, as the processors have the same dimensions, profile and construction, and similar levels of heat production.

== Sandy Bridge family of chipsets ==
Sandy Bridge chipsets, except B65, Q65 and Q67, support both Sandy Bridge and Ivy Bridge CPUs through a BIOS upgrade. With third-party BIOSes like Coreboot, Ivy Bridge processors can be used on those chipsets as well. Processors based on Sandy Bridge officially support up to DDR3-1333 memory, however in practice speeds up to DDR3-2133 have been tested to work successfully.

The H61 chipset only supports one double-sided DIMM memory module (RAM module) per memory-channel and therefore is limited to 16 GB instead of the 32 GB like the others support. On H61-based motherboards with four DIMM slots, only four single-sided DIMMs can be installed.

Name		H61	B65	Q65	Q67	H67	P67	Z68
Overclocking		GPU					CPU + RAM	CPU + GPU + RAM
Allows using built-in GPU with Intel Clear Video Technology		Yes					No	Yes
Maximum USB 2.0 ports (Note: USB 3.0 is not supported by any of these chipsets. Motherboard manufacturers may use external hardware to add USB 3.0 support.)		10	12	14				
Maximum SATA ports	2.0	4						
Maximum SATA ports	3.0	0	1	2				
Main PCIe configuration		1 × PCIe 2.0 ×16 (Some H61 Motherboards Support PCIe 3.0)					1 × PCIe 2.0 ×16 or; 2 × PCIe 2.0 ×8	
Secondary PCIe		6 × PCIe 2.0 ×1	8 × PCIe 2.0 ×1					
Conventional PCI support (Note: Although some of the chipsets do not support conventional PCI, motherboard manufacturers may include support through the addition of third-party PCI bridges.)		No	Yes			No		
Intel Rapid Storage Technology (RAID)		No			Yes			
Smart Response Technology		No						Yes
Ivy Bridge processor support		Yes	No			Yes		
Intel Active Management, Trusted Execution, Anti-Theft, and vPro Technology		No			Yes	No		
Release date		February 2011		May 2011		January 2011		May 2011
Maximum TDP		6.1 W						
Chipset lithography		65 nm						

== Ivy Bridge family of chipsets ==
All Ivy Bridge chipsets and motherboards support both Sandy Bridge and Ivy Bridge CPUs. Ivy Bridge based processors will officially support up to DDR3-1600, up from DDR3-1333 of Sandy Bridge. Some consumer Ivy Bridge chipsets will also allow overclocking of K-series processors.

Name		B75	Q75	Q77	C216	H77	Z75	Z77
Overclocking		CPU (Base Clock) + GPU					CPU + GPU + RAM	CPU + GPU + RAM
Allows using built-in GPU		Yes						
Intel Clear Video Technology		Yes						
RAID		No	Yes					
Maximum USB ports	2.0	8	10					
Maximum USB ports	3.0	4						
Maximum SATA ports	2.0	5		4				
Maximum SATA ports	3.0	1		2				
Main PCIe configuration (Note: For PCIe 3.0 capability, the Ivy Bridge CPU must have the relevant PCIe 3.0 controller built in. However, some Ivy Bridge CPUs only have a PCIe 2.0 controller built in.)		1 × PCIe 3.0 ×16					1 × PCIe 3.0 ×16 or; 2 × PCIe 3.0 ×8	1 × PCIe 3.0 ×16 or; 2 × PCIe 3.0 ×8 or; 1 × PCIe 3.0 ×8 and 2 × PCIe 3.0 ×4
Secondary PCIe		8 × PCIe 2.0 ×1						
Conventional PCI		Yes				No		
Intel Rapid Storage Technology		No		Yes				
Intel Anti-Theft Technology		Yes						
Smart Response Technology		No		Yes			No	Yes
Intel vPro Platform Eligibility		No		Yes		No		
Release date		April 2012			May 2012	April 2012		
Maximum TDP		6.7 W						
Chipset lithography		65 nm						
