= LGA 1356 =

Intel microprocessor socket

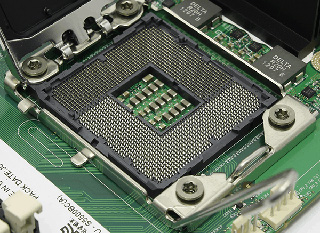
- Type: LGA
- Contacts: 1356
- FSB protocol: Intel QuickPath Interconnect
- FSB frequency: 1× QuickPath
- Processors: Sandy Bridge-EN; Ivy Bridge-EN
- Predecessor: LGA 1366, LGA 1567
- Successor: LGA 2066, LGA 3647
- Memory support: DDR3
- This article is part of the CPU socket series

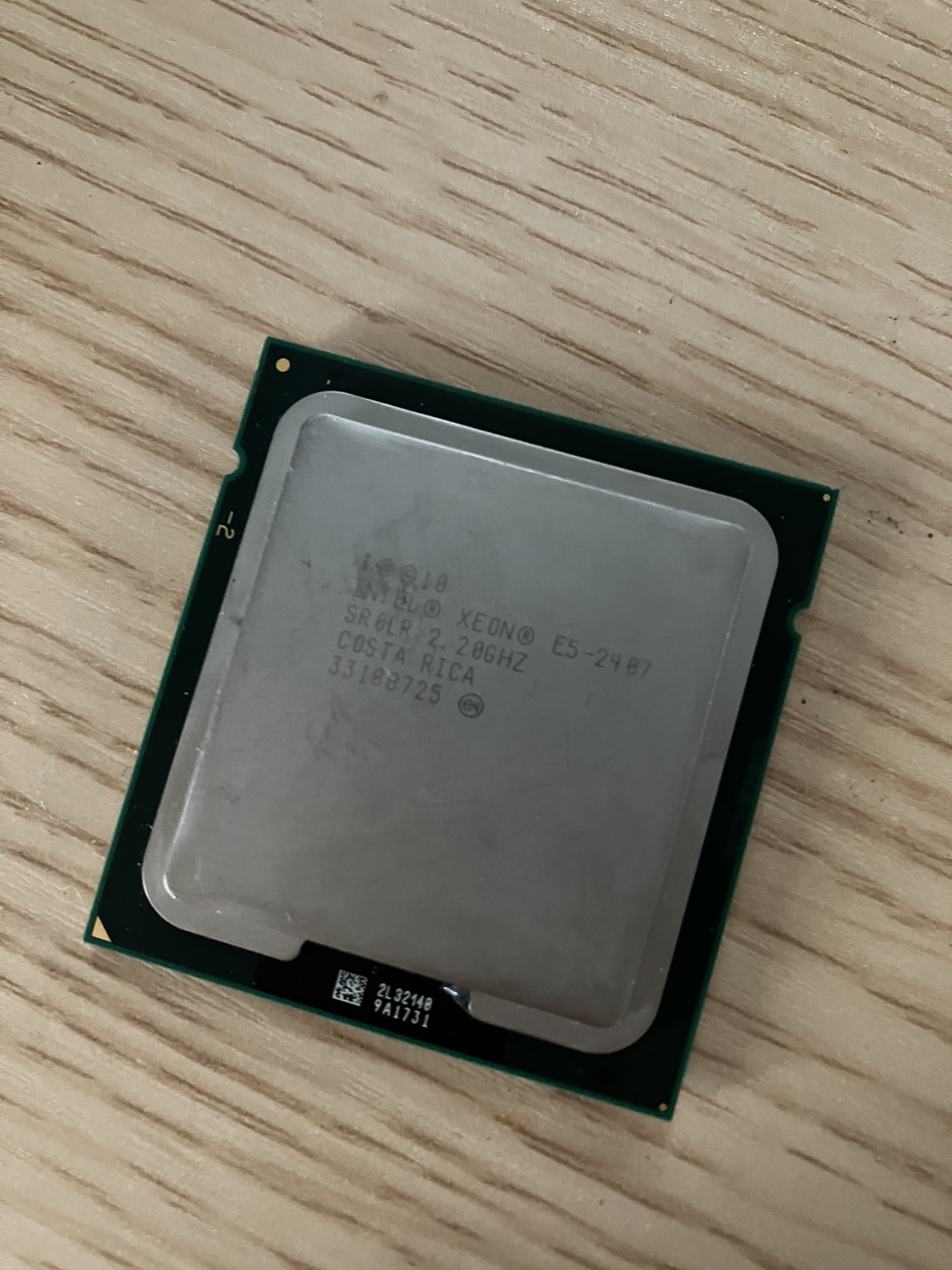
Xeon E5-2407

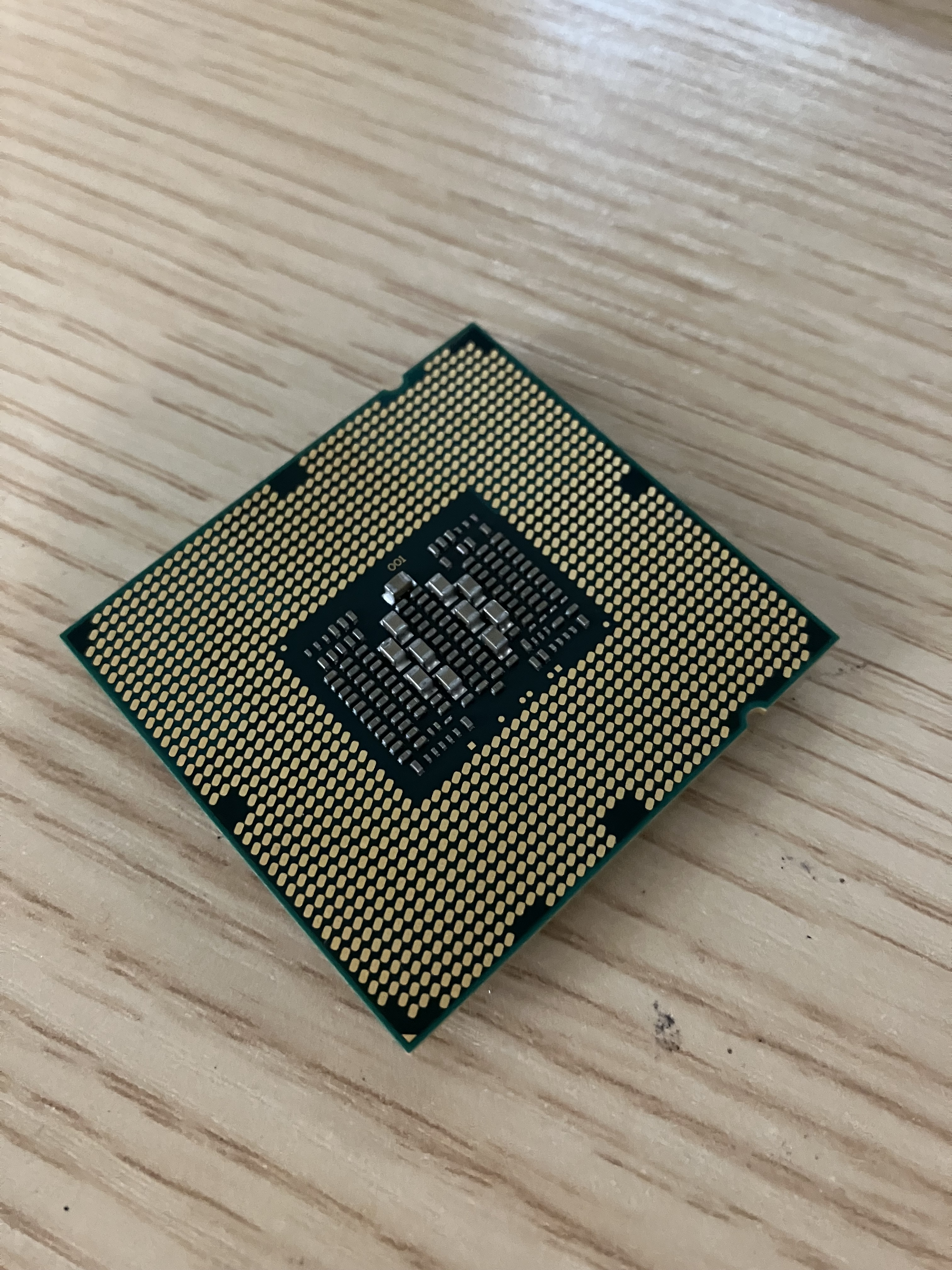
Xeon E5-2407, bottom view

LGA 1356, also called Socket B2, is an Intel microprocessor socket released in Q1 2012 with 1356 land grid array pins. It launched alongside LGA 2011 to replace its predecessor, LGA 1366 (Socket B) and LGA 1567. It's compatible with Intel Sandy Bridge-EN (also known as Romley-EN) and Ivy Bridge-EN microprocessors. This one, LGA 1155 and the first two revisions of the LGA 2011 socket are the last Intel sockets where it is possible to run Windows XP, Windows Vista, and their respective server counterparts before they were completely phased out.

== Description ==
LGA 1356 has 1356 protruding pins to make contact with the pads on the processor. Processors of LGA 1356 and LGA 1366 sockets are not compatible with each other since they have different socket notches.

While LGA 2011 was designed for high-end desktops and high-performance servers, LGA 1356 was designed for the dual-processor and low-end segment of the server market.

It supports 64-bit wide DDR3 triple channel memory, and equipped with 1 Intel QPI connection and 24 PCI Express lanes. Meanwhile LGA 2011 supports quad channel memory, 2 QPI connections and 40 PCIe lanes. Socket LGA 1155, desktop socket of the same generation supports dual channel memory. Each DDR3 channel can support one more DIMM (only applicable to DDR3 and not DDR3-L).

Plans were leaked in early 2011, with estimated releases in the first quarter of 2012. In September 2011, releases were estimated to be at the end of the first quarter of 2012.

== Physical design ==
Socket B2 processors have the following mechanical maximum load limits which should not be exceeded during heatsink assembly, shipping conditions, or standard use. Load above those limits will crack the processor die and make it unusable. The limits are included in the table below.

Location	Dynamic	Static
IHS Surface	890 N (200 lb_{f})	266 N (60 lb_{f})

Processors using this socket have the same static load limit as previous models using LGA 1366 (Socket B).

== Compatible processors ==
=== Sandy Bridge-EN ===
Socket	Model		Cores (threads)	L3Cache	CPU clock rate		Interface	Supported memory	TDP	Release date	Price (USD)
Socket	Model		Cores (threads)	L3Cache	Standard	Turbo	Interface	Supported memory	TDP	Release date	Price (USD)
LGA 1356 Dual Socket	Xeon E5	2470 v2	10 (20)	25MB	2.4GHz	3.2GHz	1× QPI DMI 2.0 24× PCI-E 3.0	3× DDR3-1600	95W	Q1 2014	$1440
LGA 1356 Dual Socket	Xeon E5	2470	8 (16)	20MB	2.3GHz	3.1GHz	1× QPI DMI 2.0 24× PCI-E 3.0	3× DDR3-1600	95W	May 14, 2012	$1440
LGA 1356 Dual Socket	Xeon E5	2450	8 (16)	20MB	2.1GHz	2.9GHz	1× QPI DMI 2.0 24× PCI-E 3.0	3× DDR3-1600	95W	May 14, 2012	$1106
LGA 1356 Dual Socket	Xeon E5	2450L	8 (16)	20MB	1.8GHz	2.3GHz	1× QPI DMI 2.0 24× PCI-E 3.0	3× DDR3-1600	70W	May 14, 2012	$1106
LGA 1356 Dual Socket	Xeon E5	2450Lv2	10 (20)	25MB	1.7GHz	2.1GHz	1× QPI DMI 2.0 24× PCI-E 3.0	3× DDR3-1600	60W	Q1 2014	$1219
LGA 1356 Dual Socket	Xeon E5	2448L	8 (16)	20MB	1.8GHz	2.1GHz	1× QPI DMI 2.0 24× PCI-E 3.0	3× DDR3-1600	70W	May 14, 2012	$1151
LGA 1356 Dual Socket	Xeon E5	2449L	8 (16)	20MB	1.4GHz	1.8GHz	1× QPI DMI 2.0 24× PCI-E 3.0	3× DDR3-1600	50W	May 14, 2012	OEM
LGA 1356 Dual Socket	Xeon E5	2440	6 (12)	15MB	2.4GHz	2.9GHz	1× QPI DMI 2.0 24× PCI-E 3.0	3× DDR3-1333	95W	May 14, 2012	$834
LGA 1356 Dual Socket	Xeon E5	2430	6 (12)	15MB	2.2GHz	2.7GHz	1× QPI DMI 2.0 24× PCI-E 3.0	3× DDR3-1333	95W	May 14, 2012	$551
LGA 1356 Dual Socket	Xeon E5	2420	6 (12)	15MB	1.9GHz	2.4GHz	1× QPI DMI 2.0 24× PCI-E 3.0	3× DDR3-1333	95W	May 14, 2012	$388
LGA 1356 Dual Socket	Xeon E5	2430L	6 (12)	15MB	2.0GHz	2.5GHz	1× QPI DMI 2.0 24× PCI-E 3.0	3× DDR3-1333	60W	May 14, 2012	$662
LGA 1356 Dual Socket	Xeon E5	2428L	6 (12)	15MB	1.8GHz	2.0GHz	1× QPI DMI 2.0 24× PCI-E 3.0	3× DDR3-1333	60W	May 14, 2012	$628
LGA 1356 Dual Socket	Xeon E5	2418L	4 (8)	10MB	2.0GHz	2.1GHz	1× QPI DMI 2.0 24× PCI-E 3.0	3× DDR3-1333	50W	May 14, 2012	$387
LGA 1356 Dual Socket	Xeon E5	2407	4 (4)	10MB	2.2GHz	N/A	1× QPI DMI 2.0 24× PCI-E 3.0	3× DDR3-1066	80W	May 14, 2012	$250
LGA 1356 Dual Socket	Xeon E5	2403	4 (4)	10MB	1.8GHz	N/A	1× QPI DMI 2.0 24× PCI-E 3.0	3× DDR3-1066	80W	May 14, 2012	$192
LGA 1356	Xeon E5	1428L	6 (12)	15MB	1.8GHz	N/A	1× QPI DMI 2.0 24× PCI-E 3.0	3× DDR3-1333	60W	May 14, 2012	$395
LGA 1356	Xeon E5	1410	4 (8)	10MB	2.8GHz	3.2GHz	1× QPI DMI 2.0 24× PCI-E 3.0	3× DDR3-1333	80W	May 14, 2012	N/A
LGA 1356	Pentium	1407	2 (2)	5MB	2.8GHz	N/A	1× QPI DMI 2.0 24× PCI-E 3.0	3× DDR3-1066	80W	May 14, 2012	N/A
LGA 1356	Pentium	1403	2 (2)	5MB	2.6GHz	N/A	1× QPI DMI 2.0 24× PCI-E 3.0	3× DDR3-1066	80W	May 14, 2012	N/A
LGA 1356	Pentium	1405	2 (2)	5MB	1.2GHz	1.8GHz	1× QPI DMI 2.0 24× PCI-E 3.0	3× DDR3-1066	40W	2012-08	$143

== See also ==
- List of Intel microprocessors
- LGA 1366
