= List of Intel Xeon processors (Core-based) =

== Xeon 3000 (uniprocessor), Dual Core ==
=== "Allendale" (65 nm) ===
- Based on Core microarchitecture
- Chip harvests from Conroe with half L2 cache disabled
- All models support: MMX, SSE, SSE2, SSE3, SSSE3, Intel 64, XD bit (an NX bit implementation), Intel VT-x
- All models support uni-processor configurations
- Die size: 111 mm^{2}
- Steppings: L2

Model number	sSpec number	Cores	Frequency	L2 cache	FSB	Mult.	Voltage	TDP	Socket	Release date	Part number(s)	Release price (USD)
Dual Core
Xeon 3040	SL9VT (L2); SLAC2 (L2)	2	1.87 GHz	2 MB	1066 MT/s	7×	0.85–1.5 V	65 W	LGA 775	January 21, 2007	HH80557KH0362M	$183
Xeon 3050	SL9VS (L2); SLABZ (L2)	2	2.13 GHz	2 MB	1066 MT/s	8×	0.85–1.5 V	65 W	LGA 775	January 21, 2007	HH80557KH0462M	$224

=== "Conroe" (65 nm) ===
Intel Xeon 3060 die shot

- Based on Core microarchitecture
- All models support: MMX, SSE, SSE2, SSE3, SSSE3, Intel 64, XD bit (an NX bit implementation), Intel VT-x
- All models support uni-processor configurations
- Die size: 143 mm^{2}
- Steppings: B2, G0

Model number	sSpec number	Cores	Frequency	L2 cache	FSB	Mult.	Voltage	TDP	Socket	Release date	Part number(s)	Release price (USD)
Dual Core
Xeon 3040	SL9TW (B2)	2	1.87 GHz	2 MB	1066 MT/s	7×	0.85–1.5 V	65 W	LGA 775	September 26, 2006	HH80557KH0362M	$183
Xeon 3050	SL9TY (B2)	2	2.13 GHz	2 MB	1066 MT/s	8×	0.85–1.5 V	65 W	LGA 775	September 26, 2006	HH80557KH0462M	$224
Xeon 3060	SL9TZ (B2); SL9ZH (B2); SLACD (B2)	2	2.4 GHz	4 MB	1066 MT/s	9×	0.85–1.5 V	65 W	LGA 775	September 26, 2006	HH80557KH0564M	$316
Xeon 3065	SLAA9 (G0)	2	2.33 GHz	4 MB	1333 MT/s	7×	0.85–1.5 V	65 W	LGA 775	October 7, 2007	HH80557KJ0534MG	$163
Xeon 3070	SL9U2 (B2); SL9ZC (B2); SLACC (B2)	2	2.67 GHz	4 MB	1066 MT/s	10×	0.85–1.5 V	65 W	LGA 775	September 26, 2006	HH80557KH0674M	$530
Xeon 3075	SLAA3 (G0)	2	2.67 GHz	4 MB	1333 MT/s	8×	0.85–1.5 V	65 W	LGA 775	October 7, 2007	HH80557KJ0674MG	$183
Xeon 3085	SLAA2 (G0)	2	3 GHz	4 MB	1333 MT/s	9×	0.85–1.5 V	65 W	LGA 775	October 7, 2007	HH80557KJ0804MG	$266

=== "Wolfdale-CL" (45 nm) ===
- Based on Penryn microarchitecture
- All models support: MMX, SSE, SSE2, SSE3, SSSE3, SSE4.1, Enhanced Intel SpeedStep Technology (EIST), Intel 64, XD bit (an NX bit implementation), Intel VT-x
- Models support only uni-processor configurations
- Die size: 107 mm^{2}
- Steppings: E0, R0

Model number	sSpec number	Cores	Frequency	L2 cache	FSB	Mult.	Voltage	TDP	Socket	Release date	Part number(s)	Release price (USD)
Single Core, low voltage
Xeon L3014	SLBB2 (R0)	1	2.4 GHz	3 MB	1066 MT/s	9×	0.85–1.3625 V	30 W	LGA 771	February 27, 2008	AT80588JH0563M	OEM
Dual Core
Xeon E3113	SLBAX (E0)	2	3 GHz	6 MB	1333 MT/s	9×	0.85–1.3625 V	65 W	LGA 771	September 8, 2008	AT80588QJ0806M	OEM

=== "Wolfdale" (45 nm) ===
- Based on Penryn microarchitecture
- All models support: MMX, SSE, SSE2, SSE3, SSSE3, SSE4.1, Intel 64, XD bit (an NX bit implementation), Intel VT-x
- All model support EIST
- All models support only single-processor configurations
- Die size: 107 mm^{2}
- Steppings: C0, E0

Model number	sSpec number	Cores	Frequency	L2 cache	FSB	Mult.	Voltage	TDP	Socket	Release date	Part number(s)	Release price (USD)
Dual Core
Xeon E3110	SLAPM (C0); SLB9C (E0)	2	3 GHz	6 MB	1333 MT/s	9×	0.85–1.3625 V	65 W	LGA 775	January 8, 2008	EU80570KJ0806M; AT80570KJ0806M	$188
Xeon E3120	SLB9D (E0)	2	3.17 GHz	6 MB	1333 MT/s	9.5×	0.85–1.3625 V	65 W	LGA 775	August 10, 2008	AT80570KJ0876M	$188
Dual Core, low voltage
Xeon L3110	SLGP9 (E0)	2	3 GHz	6 MB	1333 MT/s	9×	0.85–1.3625 V	45 W	LGA 775	February 22, 2009	AT80570JJ0806M	$224

== Xeon 5000 series (dual-processor), Dual Core ==
Intel Xeon 5150 die shot

=== "Woodcrest" (65 nm) ===
- Based on Core microarchitecture
- All models support: MMX, SSE, SSE2, SSE3, SSSE3, Intel 64, EIST, XD bit (an NX bit implementation), Intel VT-x
- All models support dual-processor configurations
- Die size: 143 mm^{2}
- Steppings: B2, G0
- For processors with G0 stepping V_{min} = 0.85 V

Model number	sSpec number	Cores	Frequency	L2 cache	FSB	Mult.	Voltage	TDP	Socket	Release date	Part number(s)	Release price (USD)
Dual Core
Xeon 5110	SL9RZ (B2); SLABR (B2); SLAGE (G0)	2	1.6 GHz	4 MB	1066 MT/s	6×	1.0–1.5 V	65 W	LGA 771	June 26, 2006	HH80556KH0254M; BX805565110A; BX805565110P	$209
Xeon 5120	SL9RY (B2); SLABQ (B2); SLAGD (G0)	2	1.87 GHz	4 MB	1066 MT/s	7×	1.0–1.5 V	65 W	LGA 771	June 26, 2006	HH80556KH0364M; BX805565120A; BX805565120P	$256
Xeon 5130	SL9RX (B2); SLABP (B2); SLAGC (G0)	2	2 GHz	4 MB	1333 MT/s	6×	1.0–1.5 V	65 W	LGA 771	June 26, 2006	HH80556KJ0414M; BX805565130A; BX805565130P	$316
Xeon 5140	SL9RW (B2); SLABN (B2); SLAGB (G0)	2	2.33 GHz	4 MB	1333 MT/s	7×	1.0–1.5 V	65 W	LGA 771	June 26, 2006	HH80556KJ0534M; BX805565140A; BX805565140P	$455
Xeon 5150	SL9RU (B2); SLABM (B2); SLAGA (G0)	2	2.67 GHz	4 MB	1333 MT/s	8×	1.0–1.5 V	65 W	LGA 771	June 26, 2006	HH80556KJ0674M; BX805565150A; BX805565150P	$690
Xeon 5160	SL9RT (B2); SLABS (B2); SLAG9 (G0)	2	3 GHz	4 MB	1333 MT/s	9×	1.0–1.5 V	80 W	LGA 771	June 26, 2006	HH80556KJ0804M; BX805565160A; BX805565160P	$851
Dual Core, low voltage
Xeon LV 5113	SLABL (G0); SLAG7	2	1.6 GHz	4 MB	800 MT/s	8×	1.15–1.25 V	40 W	LGA 771	December 4, 2006	HH80556JG0254M	OEM
Xeon LV 5128	SL9XA (B2); SLAG6 (G0)	2	1.87 GHz	4 MB	1066 MT/s	7×	1.0V–1.5V V	40 W	LGA 771	December 4, 2006	HH80556JH0364M	$412
Xeon LV 5133	SLABJ (B2); SLAG5 (G0)	2	2.2 GHz	4 MB	800 MT/s	11×	1.0–1.5 V	40 W	LGA 771	June 26, 2006	HH80556JG0494M	OEM
Xeon LV 5138	SL9RN (B2); SLAG3 (G0)	2	2.13 GHz	4 MB	1066 MT/s	8×	1.0–1.5 V	35 W	LGA 771	December 4, 2006	HH80556JH0464M	$617
Xeon LV 5148	SL9RR (B2); SLABH (B2); SLAG4 (G0)	2	2.33 GHz	4 MB	1333 MT/s	7×	1.0–1.5 V	40 W	LGA 771	September 27, 2006	HH80556JJ0534M; BX805565148A; BX805565148P	$519

=== "Wolfdale-DP" (45 nm) ===
- Based on Penryn microarchitecture
- All models support: MMX, SSE, SSE2, SSE3, SSSE3, SSE4.1, Intel 64, XD bit (an NX bit implementation), Intel VT-x
- All model support EIST except L5238, L5240.
- E5205, L5238, L5240, X5260, X5270, X5272 support Demand-Based Switching.
- All models support dual-processor configurations
- Die size: 107 mm^{2}
- Steppings: C0, E0

Model number	sSpec number	Cores	Frequency	L2 cache	FSB	Mult.	Voltage	TDP	Socket	Release date	Part number(s)	Release price (USD)
Dual Core
Xeon E5205	SLANG (C0); SLBAU (E0)	2	1.87 GHz	6 MB	1066 MT/s	7×	0.85–1.35 V	65 W	LGA 771	November 11, 2007	EU80573KH0366M; AT80573KH0366M	$177
Xeon E5220	SLANF (C0); SLBAT (E0)	2	2.33 GHz	6 MB	1333 MT/s	7×	0.85–1.35 V	65 W	LGA 771	February 27, 2008	EU80573KJ0536M; AT80573QJ0536M	OEM
Xeon E5240	SLAND (C0); SLBAW (E0)	2	3 GHz	6 MB	1333 MT/s	9×	0.85–1.35 V	65 W	LGA 771	February 27, 2008	EU80573KJ0806M; AT80573QJ0806M	OEM
Xeon X5260	SLANJ (C0); SLBAS (E0)	2	3.33 GHz	6 MB	1333 MT/s	10×	0.85–1.35 V	80 W	LGA 771	November 11, 2007	EU80573KJ0936M; AT80573KJ0936M	$851
Xeon X5270	SLBAQ (E0)	2	3.5 GHz	6 MB	1333 MT/s	10.5×	0.85–1.35 V	80 W	LGA 771	September 8, 2008	AT80573KJ1006M	$1172
Xeon X5272	SLANH (C0); SLBAR (E0)	2	3.4 GHz	6 MB	1600 MT/s	8.5×	0.85–1.35 V	80 W	LGA 771	November 11, 2007	EU80573KL0966M; AT80573KL0966M	$1172
Dual Core, low voltage
Xeon L5215	SLBB3 (E0)	2	1.87 GHz	6 MB	1066 MT/s	7×	0.85–1.35 V	20 W	LGA 771	September 8, 2008	AT80573JH0366M	OEM
Xeon L5238	SLANM (C0); SLBAZ (E0)	2	2.67 GHz	6 MB	1333 MT/s	8×	0.85–1.35 V	35 W	LGA 771	February 27, 2008	EU80573JJ0676M; AT80573JJ0676MT	OEM
Xeon L5240	SLAS3 (C0); SLBAY (E0)	2	3 GHz	6 MB	1333 MT/s	9×	0.85–1.35 V	40 W	LGA 771	February 27, 2008	EU80573JJ0806M; AT80573JJ0806M	$669
Xeon L5248	SLBAV (E0)	2	3 GHz	6 MB	1333 MT/s	9×	0.85–1.35 V	55 W	LGA 771	September 8, 2008	AT80573KJ0806MT	OEM

== Xeon 3000 series (uniprocessor), Quad Core ==
=== "Kentsfield" (65 nm) ===
- Based on Core microarchitecture
- All models support: MMX, SSE, SSE2, SSE3, SSSE3, Enhanced Intel SpeedStep Technology (EIST), Intel 64, XD bit (an NX bit implementation), Intel VT-x
- All models support uni-processor configurations
- Die size: 2× 143 mm^{2}
- Steppings: B3, G0

Model number	sSpec number	Cores	Frequency	L2 cache	FSB	Mult.	Voltage	TDP	Socket	Release date	Part number(s)	Release price (USD)
Quad Core
Xeon X3210	SL9UQ (B3); SLACU (G0)	4	2.13 GHz	2 × 4 MB	1066 MT/s	8×	0.85–1.5 V	105 W; 100 W	LGA 775	January 7, 2007	HH80562QH0468M; BX80562X3210	$690
Xeon X3220	SL9UP (B3); SLACT (G0)	4	2.4 GHz	2 × 4 MB	1066 MT/s	9×	0.85–1.5 V	105 W; 100 W	LGA 775	January 7, 2007	HH80562QH0568M; BX80562X3220	$851
Xeon X3230	SLACS (G0)	4	2.67 GHz	2 × 4 MB	1066 MT/s	10×	0.85–1.5 V	100 W	LGA 775	July 27, 2007	HH80562QH0678M; BX80562X3230	$530

=== "Yorkfield-6M" (45 nm) ===
- Based on Penryn microarchitecture
- Chip harvests from Yorkfield with half L2 cache disabled
- All models support: MMX, SSE, SSE2, SSE3, SSSE3, SSE4.1, Enhanced Intel SpeedStep Technology (EIST), Enhanced Halt State (C1E), Intel 64, XD bit (an NX bit implementation), Intel VT-x
- All models support uni-processor configurations
- Die size: M1: 2× 107 mm^{2}, R0: 2× 81 mm^{2}
- Steppings: M1, R0

Model number	sSpec number	Cores	Frequency	L2 cache	FSB	Mult.	Voltage	TDP	Socket	Release date	Part number(s)	Release price (USD)
Quad Core
Xeon X3320	SLAWF (M1); SLB69 (R0)	4	2.5 GHz	2 × 3 MB	1333 MT/s	7.5×	0.85–1.3625 V	95 W	LGA 775	January 7, 2008	EU80580KJ0606M; AT80580KJ0606M	$266
Xeon X3330	SLB6C (R0)	4	2.67 GHz	2 × 3 MB	1333 MT/s	8×	0.85–1.3625 V	95 W	LGA 775	August 10, 2008	AT80580KJ0676M	$266

=== "Yorkfield" (45 nm) ===
- Based on Penryn microarchitecture
- All models support: MMX, SSE, SSE2, SSE3, SSSE3, SSE4.1, Enhanced Intel SpeedStep Technology (EIST), Enhanced Halt State (C1E), Intel 64, XD bit (an NX bit implementation), Intel VT-x
- All models support uni-processor configurations
- Die size: 2× 107 mm^{2}
- Steppings: C1, E0

Model number	sSpec number	Cores	Frequency	L2 cache	FSB	Mult.	Voltage	TDP	Socket	Release date	Part number(s)	Release price (USD)
Quad Core
Xeon X3350	SLAN7 (C0); SLAX2 (C1); SLB8Y (E0)	4	2.67 GHz	2 × 6 MB	1333 MT/s	8×	0.85–1.3625 V	95 W	LGA 775	January 7, 2008	EU80569KJ067N; AT80569KJ067N; BX80569X3350	$316
Xeon X3360	SLAN5 (C0); SLAWZ (C1); SLB8X (E0)	4	2.83 GHz	2 × 6 MB	1333 MT/s	8.5×	0.85–1.3625 V	95 W	LGA 775	January 7, 2008	EU80569KJ073N; AT80569KJ073N; BX80569X3360	$530
Xeon X3370	SLB8Z (E0)	4	3 GHz	2 × 6 MB	1333 MT/s	9×	0.85–1.3625 V	95 W	LGA 775	August 10, 2008	AT80569KJ080N	$530
Xeon X3380	SLGPG (E0)	4	3.17 GHz	2 × 6 MB	1333 MT/s	9.5×	0.85–1.3625 V	95 W	LGA 775	February 22, 2009	AT80569KJ087N	$530
Quad Core, low voltage
Xeon L3360	SLGPF (E0)	4	2.83 GHz	2 × 6 MB	1333 MT/s	8.5×	0.85–1.3625 V	65 W	LGA 775	February 22, 2009	AT80569JJ073N	$369

=== "Yorkfield-CL" (45 nm) ===
- Based on Penryn microarchitecture
- Chip harvests from Yorkfield with half L2 cache disabled
- All models support: MMX, SSE, SSE2, SSE3, SSSE3, SSE4.1, Enhanced Intel SpeedStep Technology (EIST), Enhanced Halt State (C1E), Intel 64, XD bit (an NX bit implementation), Intel VT-x
- All models support uni-processor configurations
- Die size: 2× 107 mm^{2}
- Steppings: C1, E0

Model number	sSpec number	Cores	Frequency	L2 cache	FSB	Mult.	Voltage	TDP	Socket	Release date	Part number(s)	Release price (USD)
Quad Core
Xeon X3323	SLASE (C1); SLBC5 (E0)	4	2.5 GHz	2 × 3 MB	1333 MT/s	7.5×	0.85–1.35 V	80 W	LGA 771	March 2008	EU80584KJ060J; AT80584KJ060J	OEM
Xeon X3353	SLASD (C1); SLBC4 (E0)	4	2.67 GHz	2 × 6 MB	1333 MT/s	8×	0.85–1.35 V	80 W	LGA 771	March 2008	EU80584KJ067N; AT80584KJ067N	OEM
Xeon X3363	SLASC (C1); SLBC3 (E0)	4	2.83 GHz	2 × 6 MB	1333 MT/s	8.5×	0.85–1.35 V	80 W	LGA 771	March 2008	EU80584KJ073N; AT80584KJ073N	OEM

== Xeon 5000 series (dual-processor), Quad Core ==
=== "Clovertown" (65 nm) ===
- Based on Core microarchitecture
- All models support: MMX, SSE, SSE2, SSE3, SSSE3, Intel 64, XD bit (an NX bit implementation), Intel VT-x
- EIST support all except E5310, E5335.
- Intel Demand-Based Switching support E5320, E5345, L5318, X5355, X5365.
- All models support dual-processor configurations
- Steppings: B3, G0
- Die size: 2× 143 mm^{2}

Model number	sSpec number	Cores	Frequency	L2 cache	FSB	Mult.	Voltage	TDP	Socket	Release date	Part number(s)	Release price (USD)
Quad Core
Xeon E5310	SL9XR (B3); SLACB (B3); SLAEM (G0)	4	1.6 GHz	2 × 4 MB	1066 MT/s	6×	1.0–1.5 V	80 W	LGA 771	November 14, 2006	HH80563QH0258M	$455
Xeon E5320	SL9MV (B3); SLAC8 (B3); SLAEL (G0)	4	1.87 GHz	2 × 4 MB	1066 MT/s	7×	1.0–1.5 V	80 W	LGA 771	November 14, 2006	HH80563QH0368M	$690
Xeon E5330	SL9MW	4	2.13 GHz	2 × 4 MB	1066 MT/s	8×	1.0–1.5 V	80 W	LGA 771		HH80563QH0468M	OEM
Xeon E5335	SL9YK (B3); SLAC7 (B3); SLAEK (G0)	4	2 GHz	2 × 4 MB	1333 MT/s	6×	1.0–1.5 V	80 W	LGA 771	November 14, 2006	HH80563QJ0418M	$690
Xeon E5340	SL9MY	4	2.4 GHz	2 × 4 MB	1066 MT/s	9×	1.0–1.5 V	80 W	LGA 771		HH80563KH0568M	OEM
Xeon E5345	SL9YL (B3); SLAC5 (B3); SLAEJ (G0)	4	2.33 GHz	2 × 4 MB	1333 MT/s	7×	1.0–1.5 V	80 W	LGA 771	November 14, 2006	HH80563QJ0538M	$851
Xeon E5350, X5350	SL9N2	4	2.67 GHz	2 × 4 MB	1066 MT/s	10×	1.0–1.5 V	80,120 W	LGA 771		HH80563KH0678M	OEM
Xeon X5355	SL9YM (B3); SLAC4 (B3); SLAEG (G0)	4	2.67 GHz	2 × 4 MB	1333 MT/s	8×	1.0–1.5 V	120 W	LGA 771	November 14, 2006	HH80563KJ0678M	$1172
Xeon X5365	SLAC3 (B3); SLAED (G0)	4	3 GHz	2 × 4 MB	1333 MT/s	9×	1.0–1.5 V	150,120 W	LGA 771	March 12, 2007	HH80563KJ0808MP	$1350
Quad Core, low voltage
Xeon L5310	SL9MT (B3); SLACA (B3); SLAEQ (G0)	4	1.6 GHz	2 × 4 MB	1066 MT/s	6×	1.1–1.25 V	50 W	LGA 771	March 12, 2007	HH80563JH0258M	$455
Xeon L5318	SLAJE (G0)	4	1.6 GHz	2 × 4 MB	1066 MT/s	6×	0.9–1.25 V	40 W	LGA 771	August 13, 2007	HH80563JH0258MT	OEM
Xeon L5320	SLA4Q (B3); SLAC9 (B3); SLAEP (G0)	4	1.87 GHz	2 × 4 MB	1066 MT/s	7×	1.1–1.25 V	50 W	LGA 771	March 12, 2007	HH80563JH0368M	$519
Xeon L5335	SLAEN (G0)	4	2 GHz	2 × 4 MB	1333 MT/s	6×	1.1–1.25 V	50 W	LGA 771	August 13, 2007	HH80563JJ0418MP	$380

E5330, E5340 and E5350 is not listed on but it is mentioned on. In August 2007, E5330 is widely available. In June 2007, E5340 Engineering Samples were available on eBay.

=== "Harpertown" (45 nm) ===
- Based on Penryn microarchitecture
- All models support: MMX, SSE, SSE2, SSE3, SSSE3, SSE4.1, Intel 64, XD bit (an NX bit implementation), Intel VT-x, Demand-Based Switching except E5405, L5408; EIST except E5405
- All models support dual-processor configurations
- Die size: 2× 107 mm^{2}
- Steppings: C0, E0

Model number	sSpec number	Cores	Frequency	L2 cache	FSB	Mult.	Voltage	TDP	Socket	Release date	Part number(s)	Release price (USD)
Quad Core
Xeon E5405	SLAP2 (C0); SLBBP (E0)	4	2 GHz	2 × 6 MB	1333 MT/s	6×	0.85–1.35 V	80 W	LGA 771	November 11, 2007	EU80574KJ041N; AT80574KJ041N	$209
Xeon E5410	SLANW (C0); SLBBC (E0)	4	2.33 GHz	2 × 6 MB	1333 MT/s	7×	0.85–1.35 V	80 W	LGA 771	November 11, 2007	EU80574KJ053N; AT80574KJ053N	$256
Xeon E5420	SLANV (C0); SLBBL (E0)	4	2.5 GHz	2 × 6 MB	1333 MT/s	7.5×	0.85–1.35 V	80 W	LGA 771	November 11, 2007	EU80574KJ060N; AT80574KJ060N	$316
Xeon E5430	SLANU (C0); SLBBK (E0)	4	2.67 GHz	2 × 6 MB	1333 MT/s	8×	0.85–1.35 V	80 W	LGA 771	November 11, 2007	EU80574KJ067N; AT80574KJ067N	$455
Xeon E5440	SLANS (C0); SLBBJ (E0)	4	2.83 GHz	2 × 6 MB	1333 MT/s	8.5×	0.85–1.35 V	80 W	LGA 771	November 11, 2007	EU80574KJ073N; AT80574KJ073N	$690
Xeon E5450	SLANQ (C0); SLBBM (E0)	4	3 GHz	2 × 6 MB	1333 MT/s	9×	0.85–1.35 V	80 W	LGA 771	November 11, 2007	EU80574KJ080N; AT80574KJ080N	$915
Xeon X5450	SLASB (C0); SLBBE (E0)	4	3 GHz	2 × 6 MB	1333 MT/s	9×	0.85–1.35 V	120 W	LGA 771	November 11, 2007	EU80574KJ080NT; AT80574KJ080NT	$851
Xeon X5460	SLANP (C0); SLBBA (E0)	4	3.17 GHz	2 × 6 MB	1333 MT/s	9.5×	0.85–1.35 V	120 W	LGA 771	November 11, 2007	EU80574KJ087N; AT80574KJ087NT	$1172
Xeon E5462	SLANT (C0); SLBBN (E0)	4	2.8 GHz	2 × 6 MB	1600 MT/s	7×	0.85–1.35 V	80 W	LGA 771	November 11, 2007	EU80574KL072N; AT80574KL072	$797
Xeon X5470	SLBBF (E0)	4	3.33 GHz	2 × 6 MB	1333 MT/s	10×	0.85–1.35 V	120 W	LGA 771	September 8, 2008	AT80574KJ093N	$1386
Xeon E5472	SLANR (C0); SLBBH (E0)	4	3 GHz	2 × 6 MB	1600 MT/s	7.5×	0.85–1.35 V	80 W	LGA 771	November 11, 2007	EU80574KL080N; AT80574KL080	$1022
Xeon X5472	SLASA (C0); SLBBB (E0)	4	3 GHz	2 × 6 MB	1600 MT/s	7.5×	0.85–1.35 V	120 W	LGA 771	November 11, 2007	EU80574KL080NT; AT80574KL080N	$958
Xeon X5482	SLANZ (C0); SLBBG (E0)	4	3.2 GHz	2 × 6 MB	1600 MT/s	8×	0.85–1.35 V	150 W	LGA 771	November 11, 2007	EU80574KL088; AT80574KL088N	$1279
Xeon X5492	SLBBD (E0)	4	3.4 GHz	2 × 6 MB	1600 MT/s	8.5×	0.85–1.35 V	150 W	LGA 771	September 8, 2008	AT80574KL096N	$1493
Quad Core, low voltage
Xeon L5408	SLAP5 (C0); SLBBT (E0)	4	2.13 GHz	2 × 6 MB	1066 MT/s	8×	0.85–1.35 V	40 W	LGA 771	February 27, 2008	EU80574JH046N; AT80574JH046NT	OEM
Xeon L5410	SLAP4 (C0); SLBBS (E0)	4	2.33 GHz	2 × 6 MB	1333 MT/s	7×	0.85–1.35 V	50 W	LGA 771	March 25, 2008	EU80574JJ053N; AT80574JJ053N	$320
Xeon L5420	SLARP (C0); SLBBR (E0)	4	2.5 GHz	2 × 6 MB	1333 MT/s	7.5×	0.85–1.35 V	50 W	LGA 771	March 25, 2008	EU80574JJ060N; AT80574JJ060N	$380
Xeon L5430	SLBBQ (E0)	4	2.67 GHz	2 × 6 MB	1333 MT/s	8×	0.85–1.35 V	50 W	LGA 771	September 8, 2008	AT80574JJ067N	$562

== Xeon 7000 series (multiprocessor) ==
=== "Tigerton" (dual-core) (65 nm) ===
- Based on Core microarchitecture
- All models support: MMX, SSE, SSE2, SSE3, SSSE3, Enhanced Intel SpeedStep Technology (EIST), Intel 64, XD bit (an NX bit implementation), Intel VT-x
- All models support quad-processor configurations
- Die size: 143 mm^{2}
- Steppings: G0

Model number	sSpec number	Cores	Frequency	L2 cache	FSB	Mult.	Voltage	TDP	Socket	Release date	Part number(s)	Release price (USD)
Dual Core
Xeon E7210	SLA6D (G0)	2	2.4 GHz	2 × 4 MB	1066 MT/s	9×	1.2–1.325 V	80 W	Socket 604	September 6, 2007	LF80564QH0568M	$856
Xeon E7220	SLA6C (G0)	2	2.93 GHz	2 × 4 MB	1066 MT/s	11×	1.2–1.325 V	80 W	Socket 604	September 6, 2007	LF80564QH0778M	$1177

=== "Tigerton QC" (quad-core) (MCP, 65 nm) ===
- Based on Core microarchitecture
- All models support: MMX, SSE, SSE2, SSE3, SSSE3, Enhanced Intel SpeedStep Technology (EIST), Intel 64, XD bit (an NX bit implementation), Intel VT-x
- All models support quad-processor configurations
- Die size: 2× 143 mm^{2}
- Steppings: G0

Model number	sSpec number	Cores	Frequency	L2 cache	FSB	Mult.	Voltage	TDP	Socket	Release date	Part number(s)	Release price (USD)
Quad Core
Xeon E7310	SLA6A (G0)	4	1.6 GHz	2 × 2 MB	1066 MT/s	6×	1.2–1.35 V	80 W	Socket 604	September 6, 2007	LF80565QH0254M	$856
Xeon E7320	SLA69 (G0)	4	2.13 GHz	2 × 2 MB	1066 MT/s	8×	1.2–1.35 V	80 W	Socket 604	September 6, 2007	LF80565QH0464M	$1177
Xeon E7330	SLA77 (G0)	4	2.4 GHz	2 × 3 MB	1066 MT/s	9×	1.2–1.35 V	80 W	Socket 604	September 6, 2007	LF80565QH0566M	$1391
Xeon E7340	SLA68 (G0)	4	2.4 GHz	2 × 4 MB	1066 MT/s	9×	1.2–1.35 V	80 W	Socket 604	September 6, 2007	LF80565QH0568M	$1980
Xeon X7350	SLA67 (G0)	4	2.93 GHz	2 × 4 MB	1066 MT/s	11×	1.2–1.35 V	130 W	Socket 604	September 6, 2007	LF80565KH0778M	$2301
Quad Core, low voltage
Xeon L7345	SLA6B (G0)	4	1.87 GHz	2 × 4 MB	1066 MT/s	7×	1.10–1.25 V	50 W	Socket 604	September 6, 2007	LF80565JH0368M	$2301

=== "Dunnington QC" (quad-core) (45 nm) ===
- Based on Penryn microarchitecture
- Chip harvests from Dunnington with two cores disabled
- All models support: MMX, SSE, SSE2, SSE3, SSSE3, SSE4.1, Demand-Based Switching, Intel 64, XD bit (an NX bit implementation), Intel VT-x
- E7440 supports Enhanced Intel SpeedStep Technology (EIST).
- All models support quad-processor configurations
- Transistors: 1.9 billion
- Die size: 503 mm^{2}
- Steppings: A1

Model number	sSpec number	Frequency	L2 cache	L3 cache	FSB	Mult	Voltage	TDP	Socket	Release date	Part number(s)	Release price (USD)
Quad Core
Xeon E7420	SLG9G (A1)	2133 MHz	2× 3 MB	8 MB	1066 MT/s	8×	0.9–1.45 V	90 W	Socket 604	September 15, 2008	AD80583QH0468M	$1177
Xeon E7430	SLG9H (A1)	2133 MHz	2× 3 MB	12 MB	1066 MT/s	8×	0.9–1.45 V	90 W	Socket 604	September 15, 2008	AD80583QH046003	$1391
Xeon E7440	SLG9J (A1)	2400 MHz	2× 3 MB	16 MB	1066 MT/s	9×	0.9–1.45 V	90 W	Socket 604	September 15, 2008	AD80583QH056007	$1980
Quad Core, low voltage
Xeon L7445	SLG9L (A1)	2133 MHz	2× 3 MB	12 MB	1066 MT/s	8×	0.9–1.45 V	50 W	Socket 604	September 15, 2008	AD80583JH046003	$1980

=== "Dunnington" (six core) (45 nm) ===
- Based on Penryn microarchitecture
- All models support: MMX, SSE, SSE2, SSE3, SSSE3, SSE4.1, Demand-Based Switching, Intel 64, XD bit (an NX bit implementation), Intel VT-x
- E7450 and X7460 support Enhanced Intel SpeedStep Technology (EIST).
- All models support six-core processor configurations
- Transistors: 1.9 billion
- Die size: 503 mm^{2}
- Steppings: A1

Model number	sSpec number	Frequency	L2 cache	L3 cache	FSB	Mult	Voltage	TDP	Socket	Release date	Part number(s)	Release price (USD)
Six Core
Xeon E7450	SLG9K (A1)	2400 MHz	3× 3 MB	12 MB	1066 MT/s	9×	0.9–1.45 V	90 W	Socket 604	September 15, 2008	AD80582QH056003	$2301
Xeon E7458	SLG9N (A1)	2400 MHz	3× 3 MB	16 MB	1066 MT/s	9×	0.9–1.45 V	90 W	Socket 604	September 15, 2008	AD80582QH056007	OEM
Xeon X7460	SLG9P (A1)	2667 MHz	3× 3 MB	16 MB	1066 MT/s	10×	0.9–1.45 V	130 W	Socket 604	September 15, 2008	AD80582KH067007	$2729
Six Core, low voltage
Xeon L7455	SLG9M (A1)	2133 MHz	3× 3 MB	12 MB	1066 MT/s	8×	0.9–1.45 V	65 W	Socket 604	September 15, 2008	AD80582JH046003	$2729
