= Lynnfield (microprocessor) =

CPU made by Intel

General information
- Launched: 2009
- Marketed by: Intel
- Designed by: Intel
- Common manufacturer: Intel
- CPUID code: 106Ex
- Product code: 80605

Performance
- Max. CPU clock rate: 2.40 GHz to 3.73 GHz
- DMI speeds: 2 GT/s

Cache
- L1 cache: 64 KB per core (32 KB data + 32 KB instructions)
- L2 cache: 1 MB (256 KB per core)
- L3 cache: 8 MB

Architecture and classification
- Application: Desktop
- Technology node: 45 nm (774 million transistors)
- Microarchitecture: Nehalem
- Instruction set: x86, x86-64, MMX, SSE, SSE2, SSE3, SSSE3, SSE4.1, SSE4.2

Physical specifications
- Transistors: 774 million
- Cores: 4
- Memory (RAM): Up to 32 GB; Up to DDR3-1333
- Socket: LGA 1156

Products, models, variants
- Brand names: Core i5-7xx; Core i5-7xxS; Core i7-8xx; Core i7-8xxS; Core i7-8xxK; Xeon X34xx; Xeon L34xx

History
- Predecessors: Wolfdale; Yorkfield
- Successor: Sandy Bridge

Support status
- Unsupported

Lynnfield is the code name for a quad-core processor from Intel released in September 2009. It was sold in varying configurations as Core i5-7xx, Core i7-8xx or Xeon X34xx. Lynnfield uses the Nehalem microarchitecture and replaces the earlier Penryn based Wolfdale and Yorkfield processors, using the same 45 nm process technology, but with a new memory and bus interface. The product code for Lynnfield is 80605, its CPUID value identifies it as family 6, model 30 (0106Ex).

Lynnfield is related to the earlier Bloomfield and Gainestown microprocessors, which are used in server and high-end desktop systems. The main difference between the two is Lynnfield's use of the LGA 1156 processor socket as opposed to the LGA 1366 socket used by Bloomfield and Gainestown processors. LGA 1156 processors include Direct Media Interface and PCI Express links, which Intel has previously connected to the processor with a dedicated northbridge chip, called the memory controller hub or I/O hub.

The Lynnfield series of processors does not include built-in Intel graphics.

The mobile version of Lynnfield is Clarksfield. The dual-core version was going to be Havendale, but it was cancelled in favor of Clarkdale.

== Brand names ==
Brand name	Model (list)	Market	Clock frequency range	HT	ECC RAM/Max. RAM
Core i5	i5-7xx	Performance desktop	2.67–2.80 GHz	No	No/16 (32 unofficially) GB
Core i5	i5-7xxS	Performance desktop	2.40 GHz	No	No/16 (32 unofficially) GB
Core i7	i7-8xx	Performance desktop	2.80–3.07 GHz	Yes	No/16 (32 unofficially) GB
Core i7	i7-875K	Performance desktop	2.93 GHz (unlocked)	Yes	No/16 (32 unofficially) GB
Core i7	i7-8xxS	Performance desktop	2.53–2.67 GHz	Yes	No/16 (32 unofficially) GB
Xeon	X34xx	UP server	1.86–3.07 GHz	some	Yes/32 GB

== See also ==
- Nehalem (microarchitecture)
- Yorkfield (microprocessor)
- Clarksfield (microprocessor)
- Clarkdale (microprocessor)
- List of Macintosh models grouped by CPU type
