= Conroe =

Conroe may refer to:

- Conroe, Texas, a city in the United States
- Conroe (microprocessor), the code name for many Intel processors
