= Bloomfield (microprocessor) =

Processor product line

General information
- Launched: November 2008
- Discontinued: January 2011
- Marketed by: Intel
- Designed by: Intel
- CPUID code: 106Ax
- Product code: 80601

Performance
- Max. CPU clock rate: 2.66 GHz to 3.33 GHz

Physical specifications
- Cores: 4
- Socket: LGA 1366

Cache
- L1 cache: 4× (32 KB + 32 KB)
- L2 cache: 4× 256 KB
- L3 cache: 8 MiB

Architecture and classification
- Application: Desktop
- Technology node: 45 nm
- Microarchitecture: Nehalem
- Instruction set: x86, x86-64, MMX, SSE, SSE2, SSE3, SSSE3, SSE4.1, SSE4.2

Products, models, variants
- Brand names: Xeon 35xx; Core i7-9xx (except 970, 980, 980X and 990X)

History
- Predecessor: Yorkfield
- Successor: Sandy Bridge

Support status
- Unsupported

Bloomfield is the code name for Intel high-end desktop processors sold as Core i7-9xx and single-processor servers sold as Xeon 35xx., in almost identical configurations, replacing the earlier Yorkfield processors. The Bloomfield core is closely related to the dual-processor Gainestown, which has the same CPUID value of 0106Ax (family 6, model 26) and which uses the same socket. Bloomfield uses a different socket than the later Lynnfield and Clarksfield processors based on the same 45 nm Nehalem microarchitecture, even though some of these share the same Intel Core i7 brand.

== Features ==
Bloomfield has many new features that represent significant changes from Yorkfield:

- The new LGA 1366 socket is incompatible with earlier processors.
- On-die memory controller: the memory is directly connected to the processor. It is called the uncore part and runs at a different clock (uncore clock) than the execution cores.
  - Three channel memory: each channel can support up to two DDR3 DIMMs. Motherboards for Bloomfield generally have three, four (2, 1, 1), or six DIMM slots.
  - Support for DDR3 memory only.
- The front side bus has been replaced by the Intel QuickPath Interconnect interface. Motherboards must use a chipset that supports QuickPath Interconnect.
- The following caches:
  - 32 kB L1 instruction and 32 kB L1 data cache per core
  - 256 kB L2 cache (combined instruction and data) per core
  - 8 MB L3 (combined instruction and data) "inclusive", shared by all cores
- Single-die device: all four cores, the memory controller, and all cache are on a single die, instead of a Multi-chip module of two dual-core dies as in Yorkfield
- "Turbo Boost" technology allows all active cores to intelligently clock themselves up in steps of 133 MHz over the design clock rate as long as the CPU's predetermined thermal and electrical requirements are still met.
- Re-implemented Hyper-threading. Hyperthreading was introduced in the older NetBurst microarchitecture, but omitted from the subsequent Core, which was a descendant of the Pentium III family. With hyperthreading enabled, each of the four physical cores can process up to two threads simultaneously, so the processor appears to the OS as eight logical CPUs.
- Only one QuickPath interface: not intended for multi-processor motherboards.
- 45 nm process technology.
- 731 million transistors.
- 263 mm^{2} die size.
- Sophisticated power management can place an unused core in a zero-power mode.
- Support for SSE4.2 & SSE4.1 instruction sets.

== Brand names ==
Brand name	Model (list)	Market	Clock frequency range	QuickPath Interface
Core i7	i7-9xx	Performance Desktop	2.66–3.20 GHz	1× 4.8 GT/s
Core i7	i7-9xx Extreme Edition	Extreme Desktop	3.2–3.33 GHz	1× 6.4 GT/s
Xeon	W35xx	Workstation	2.4–3.2 GHz	4.8–6.4 GT/s

== Processor cores ==
- The clock rates listed here are as specified by Intel for normal mode. "Turbo boost" can increase the rate on active cores in steps of the base clock (133 MHz if not overclocked) up to a predetermined limit for short periods when required, which can be useful with single threaded applications.
- The I7-965 XE and I7-975 XE have separate unlocked multipliers for memory and cores.
  - Core clock above those in the table are not guaranteed by Intel. A CPU Clock Speed of 6.158 GHz has been achieved.
  - Memory rates above those in the table are not guaranteed by Intel. Memory Speeds of DDR3-2133 have been achieved. Higher Rates have been Reported to have been achieved.
- The processor has a Thermal Design Power of 130 W and will slow itself down if this power is exceeded. This feature can be disabled from an option in most of the new motherboards' BIOS.
- Prices are Intel's wholesale prices for lots of 1,000 units in US$ at product launch.

Core i7 Model	nm	Cores (threads)	Clocks (GHz)			Clock multiplier		Price (US$)	Cache	Memory controller	QuickPath interface	Thermal design power	Socket	Release date
Core i7 Model	nm	Cores (threads)	Core	Uncore	Base	Core	Uncore	Price (US$)	Cache	Memory controller	QuickPath interface	Thermal design power	Socket	Release date
i7-920	45 nm	4 (8)	2.66	2.13	0.133	20	16	284	256 kB L2/core; 8 MB shared L3	3× DDR3-800/1,066 MT/s	1× 4.8 GT/s	130 W	LGA 1366	2008-11-17
i7-930	45 nm	4 (8)	2.80	2.13	0.133	21	16	294	256 kB L2/core; 8 MB shared L3	3× DDR3-800/1,066 MT/s	1× 4.8 GT/s	130 W	LGA 1366	2010-02-28
i7-940	45 nm	4 (8)	2.93	2.13	0.133	22	16	562	256 kB L2/core; 8 MB shared L3	3× DDR3-800/1,066 MT/s	1× 4.8 GT/s	130 W	LGA 1366	2008-11-17
i7-950	45 nm	4 (8)	3.06	2.13	0.133	23	16	562	256 kB L2/core; 8 MB shared L3	3× DDR3-800/1,066 MT/s	1× 4.8 GT/s	130 W	LGA 1366	2009-06-03
i7-960	45 nm	4 (8)	3.20	2.13	0.133	24	16	562	256 kB L2/core; 8 MB shared L3	3× DDR3-800/1,066 MT/s	1× 4.8 GT/s	130 W	LGA 1366	2009-10-18
i7-965 Extreme Edition	45 nm	4 (8)	3.20	2.66	0.133	24	20	999	256 kB L2/core; 8 MB shared L3	3× DDR3-800/1,066 MT/s	1× 6.4 GT/s	130 W	LGA 1366	2008-11-17
i7-975 Extreme Edition	45 nm	4 (8)	3.33	2.66	0.133	25	20	999	256 kB L2/core; 8 MB shared L3	3× DDR3-800/1,066 MT/s	1× 6.4 GT/s	130 W	LGA 1366	2009-06-03

== Performance ==
- The Inquirer managed to get a 965 engineering sample to a core clock rate of up to 4 GHz with fan cooling and Turbo Boost.
- IT OC Taiwan overclocked an engineering sample of the 965, to 4.20 GHz with a QPI rate of 200 MHz and a multiplier value of 21.0. A vCore setting of 1.72 V was used, which is far higher than the stock voltage of 1.25V and could have led to damaging the CPU or motherboard.
- A Core i7 940 system running at stock clock rates has obtained a 3DMark Vantage benchmark CPU score of 17,966. A Core i7 920 system scored 16,294 running at stock clock rates. An Intel Core 2 Extreme QX9770, a very expensive member of the previous generation of Intel processors (costing over four times the price of the 920 at its launch), scored 13,182 also running at stock clock rates.
- AnandTech tested the Intel QuickPath Interconnect (4.8 GT/s version) and found the copy bandwidth using triple-channel 1,066 MHz DDR3 was 12.0 GB/s. A 3.0 GHz Core 2 Quad system using dual-channel 1066 MHz DDR3 achieved 6.9 GB/s.
- Maximum PC has discovered that Intel has unlocked the QPI clock and memory multipliers on retail 920s and 940s. This is allegedly due to consumer feedback.
- Core i7-975 will have the new D0 Stepping. Tests made by X-bit labs shows that it has better energy efficiency and overclockability than C0 stepping.
- The Intel Core i7-975 Extreme Edition was considered the world's fastest desktop processor (until the i7-980x) by a review from Hot Hardware. It runs at a clock rate of 3.33 GHz with Turbo Boost clock rates running the processor up 3.46 GHz with all four cores put at work and 3.6 GHz with a single core at work. The processor was overclocked to 4.1 GHz while keeping a 50 °C (122 °F) core temperature with the stock cooling unit.

== Overclocking ==
The process of overclocking the Bloomfield architecture is similar to that of the AMD architecture due to the on-die MCH. Over-clocking will be possible with the 900 series and a motherboard equipped with the X58 chipset. In early October 2008, reports surfaced that it will not be possible to use "performance" DDR3 DIMMs that require voltages higher than 1.65v, because the integrated memory controller within the Core i7 will be damaged.

Bloomfield has three memory channels, and the channel bandwidth can be selected by setting the memory multiplier. However, in early benchmarks, when the clock rate is set higher than a threshold (1333 for the 965XE) the processor will only access two memory channels simultaneously. A 965XE has higher memory throughput with 3xDDR3-1333 than with 3xDDR3-1600, and 2xDDR3-1600 has almost identical throughput to 3xDDR3-1333.

== Drawbacks ==
The Core i7 Bloomfield does not support error-correcting memory. Some motherboards with an LGA 1366 socket support both Core i7 and the Xeon 35xx and 55xx series processors, and advertise support for ECC memory. However ECC functionality is only available if a Xeon is installed, not if a Core i7 is installed.

== Product evolution ==
The Core i7 950 and the Core i7 975 Extreme Edition were introduced in March 2009 with prices similar to the prices for the 940 and 965 Extreme Edition, respectively, but with better performance in each case. Intel has scheduled the discontinuation of the 940 and 965XE for Q3 2009. Intel announced discontinuations in other older families at the same time.

== See also ==
- Yorkfield (microprocessor)
- Gainestown (microprocessor)
- Lynnfield (microprocessor)
- List of Intel Xeon microprocessors
- List of Intel Core i7 microprocessors
- List of Macintosh models grouped by CPU type
