= Clarkdale (microprocessor) =

Intel computer processor

General information
- Launched: January 7, 2010
- Designed by: Intel
- CPUID code: 02065x
- Product code: 80616

Performance
- Max. CPU clock rate: 2.27 GHz to 3.6 GHz

Physical specifications
- Cores: 2
- Socket: LGA 1156

Cache
- L2 cache: 2×256 KB
- L3 cache: 4 MB

Architecture and classification
- Application: Desktop
- Technology node: 32 nm
- Microarchitecture: Westmere
- Instruction set: x86, x86-64, MMX, SSE, SSE2, SSE3, SSSE3, SSE4.1, SSE4.2, AES-NI

Products, models, variants
- Brand names: Core i5-6xx; Core i3-5xx; Pentium G6xxx; Celeron G1xxx; Xeon L340x

Clarkdale is the codename for Intel's first-generation Core i5, i3 and Pentium dual-core desktop processors. It is closely related to the mobile Arrandale processor; both use dual-core dies based on the 32 nm Westmere microarchitecture and have integrated Graphics, PCI Express and DMI links built-in.

Clarkdale is the successor of the Wolfdale used in desktop Intel Core 2, Celeron and Pentium Dual-Core processors. Unlike its predecessor, Clarkdale already contains the major north bridge components, such as memory controller, PCI Express for external graphics, integrated graphics and the DMI connector, making it possible to build more compact systems without a separate north bridge or discrete graphics like Lynnfield.

The Clarkdale processor package contains two dies: the 32 nm processor die with the I/O connections, and the 45 nm graphics and integrated memory controller die. Physical separation of the processor die and memory controller die resulted in increased memory latency.

The CPUID for Clarkdale is family 6, model 37 (2065x). The mobile equivalent of Clarkdale is Arrandale.

== Brand names ==
Clarkdale processors are sold under the Intel Core, Pentium and Celeron brand names, with varying feature sets. The Core i5 versions generally have all features enabled, with the Core i5-661 and Core i5-655K models lacking Intel VT-d and TXT like the Core i3, which also does not support Turbo Boost and AES new instructions. In addition, the Pentium and Celeron versions do not have SMT, and they can only use a reduced amount of third-level cache.

The Xeon L340x line has a lower clock frequency and thermal design power, and supports unbuffered ECC memory in addition to the features of the Core i5-6xx, but has support for the integrated graphics disabled.

Importantly, although the memory controller in Clarkdale processors is on-package, it is on a separate die from the CPU cores, and thus has increased latency compared to processor architectures which integrate it on-die with the main CPU cores.

Brand Name	Model (list)	Logo	L3 Cache size	Thermal Design Power
Celeron	G1xxx		2 MB	73 W
Pentium	G6xxx		3 MB	73 W
Core i3	i3-5xx		4 MB	73 W
Core i5	i5-6xx		4 MB	73–87 W
Xeon	L340x		4 MB	30 W

== See also ==
- Intel Core
- Intel Core i5
- Wolfdale (microprocessor)
- Lynnfield (microprocessor)
- List of Macintosh models grouped by CPU type
