= Yorkfield =

Code name for some Intel processors

Yorkfield (microprocessor)
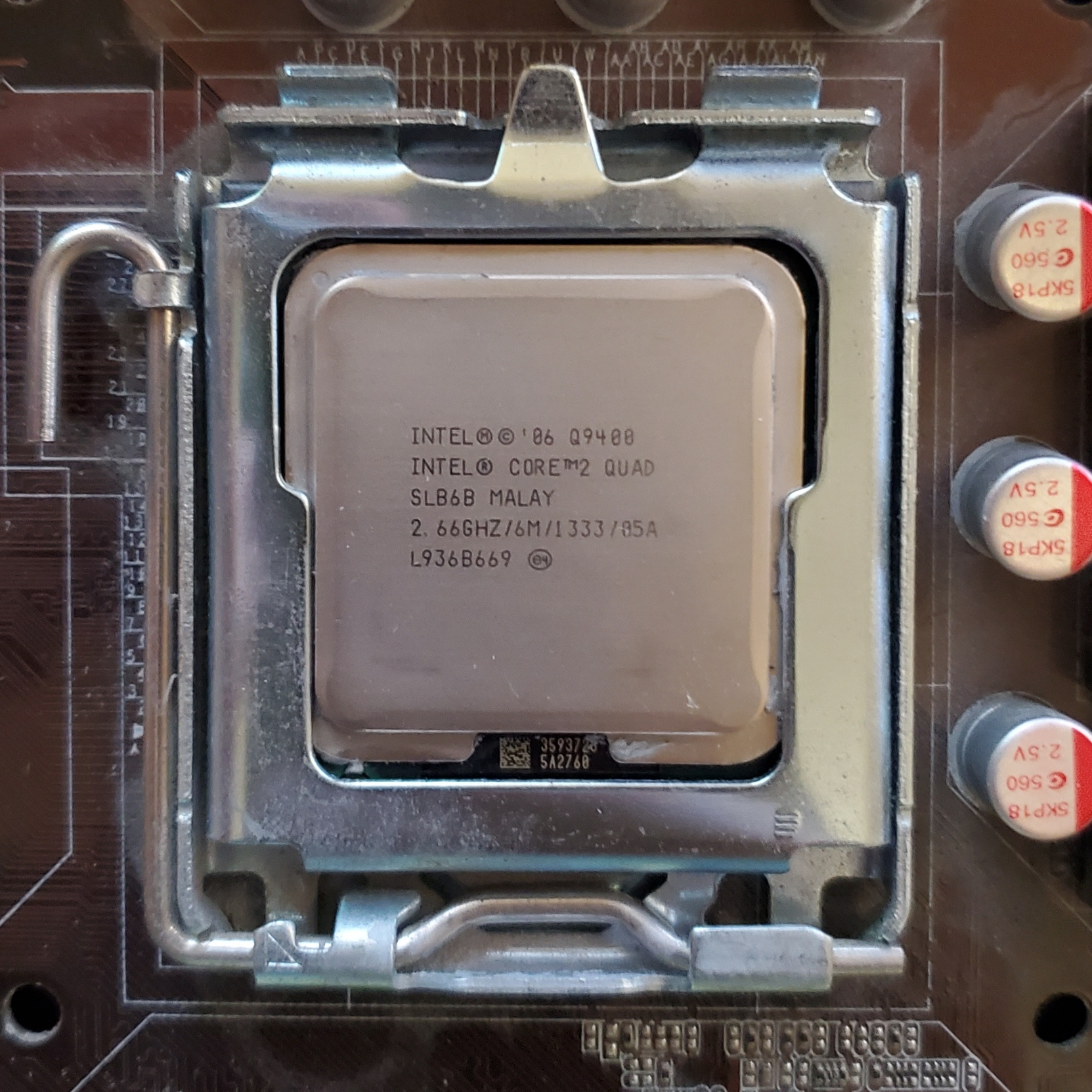
- A Core 2 Quad Q9400

General information
- Launched: 2007
- Discontinued: 2011?
- CPUID code: 1067x
- Product code: Yorkfield: 80580 Yorkfield-6M: 80581 Yorkfield CL: 80584

Performance
- Max. CPU clock rate: 2333 MHz to 3200 MHz
- FSB speeds: 1066 MT/s to 1600 MT/s

Cache
- L2 cache: Yorkfield: 12 MB; Yorkfield-6M: 6 MB

Architecture and classification
- Application: Desktop
- Microarchitecture: Penryn
- Instruction set: x64

Physical specifications
- Cores: 4 (2 cores per die)
- Socket: LGA 775, LGA 771

Products, models, variants
- Brand names: Core 2 Quad Q8xxx; Core 2 Quad Q9xxx; Core 2 Extreme QX9xxx; Xeon 33xx
- Variant: Penryn QC

History
- Predecessor: Kentsfield
- Successors: Lynnfield (desktops and low-end servers); Bloomfield (enthusiast and uniprocessor workstation)

Support status
- Unsupported

Yorkfield is the code name for some Intel processors sold as Core 2 Quad and Xeon. In Intel's Tick-Tock cycle, the 2007/2008 "Tick" was Penryn microarchitecture, the shrink of the Core microarchitecture to 45 nanometers as CPUID model 23, replacing Kentsfield, the previous model.

Like its predecessor, Yorkfield multi-chip modules come in two sizes. The smaller version is equipped with 6MB L2 cache, and is commonly called Yorkfield-6M. The larger version is equipped with 12 MB L2 cache.

The mobile version of Yorkfield is Penryn-QC and the dual-socket server version is Harpertown. The MP server Dunnington chip is a more distant relative based on a different chip but using the same 45 nm Core microarchitecture. The Wolfdale desktop processor is a dual-core version of Yorkfield.

The successors to Yorkfield are the Nehalem based Lynnfield and Bloomfield.

== Variants ==
Processor	Brand Name	Model (list)	Cores	L2 Cache	Socket	TDP
Yorkfield	Xeon	X33x0	4	2×3–2×6 MB	LGA 775	65–95 W
Yorkfield-CL	Xeon	X33x3	4	2×3–2×6 MB	LGA 771	80 W
Yorkfield-6M	Core 2 Quad	Q8xxx	4	2×2 MB	LGA 775	65–95 W
Yorkfield-6M	Core 2 Quad	Q9x0x	4	2×3 MB	LGA 775	65–95 W
Yorkfield	Core 2 Quad	Q9x5x	4	2×6 MB	LGA 775	65–95 W
Yorkfield XE	Core 2 Extreme	QX9xxx	4	2×6 MB	LGA 775	130–136 W
Yorkfield XE	Core 2 Extreme	QX9xx5	4	2×6 MB	LGA 771	150 W

=== Yorkfield ===
Yorkfield (codename for the Core 2 Quad Q9x5x series and Xeon X33x0 series) features a dual-die quad core design with two unified 6 MB L2 caches; their product code is 80569. They also feature 1333 MT/s FSB and are compatible with the Bearlake chipset. These processors were released in late March 2008 beginning with the Q9300 and Q9450. Yorkfield CPUs were expected to be released in January 2008. The release of Yorkfield, however, was delayed to March 15, 2008. Initially this delay was attributed to an error found in the Yorkfield chip, but later reports claimed that the delay was necessary in order to ensure compatibility with the 4-layer printed circuit boards utilized by many mainstream motherboards. At the Intel Developer Forum 2007, a Yorkfield processor was compared with a Kentsfield processor.

=== Yorkfield-6M ===
Yorkfield-6M (product code 80580) are similar to Yorkfield but are made from two Wolfdale-3M like cores, so they have a total of 6 MB of L2 cache, with 3 MB shared by two cores. They are used in Core 2 Quad Q8xxx with 4 MB cache enabled and Core 2 Quad Q9xxx and Xeon X3320/X3330 processors with all of the 6 MB enabled. Q8xxx processors initially had no support for Intel VT unlike Q9xxx, but later versions all have VT enabled.

=== Yorkfield XE ===
On November 11, 2007, Intel released the first Yorkfield XE processor, Core 2 Extreme QX9650. It is the first Intel desktop processor to use 45 nm technology and high-k metal gates. Yorkfield features a dual-die quad core design with two unified level-two (L2) caches of 6 MB each. It also features a 1333 MT/s FSB and clock rate of 3 GHz. The processor incorporates SSE4.1 instructions and has total of 820 million transistors on 2x107 mm^{2} dies. QX9650 and QX9770 both are labeled as product code 80569 like Yorkfield, while QX9775, being made for Dual LGA 771 mainboards, uses product code 80574 like the Xeon X5482 "Harpertown" that it is closely related to.

=== Yorkfield CL ===
The OEM-only Xeon X33x3 processors with 80 W TDP and product code 80584 are made for LGA 771 like Harpertown but are only supported in single-socket configurations. Like the dual-core Wolfdale-CL processor, these would work in regular Socket 775 mainboards after modification but are typically used in blade servers that otherwise require DP server processors like Wolfdale-DP or Harpertown.

Atom (ULV)		Node name	Pentium/Core						
Microarch.	Step	Node name	Microarch.	Step					
		600 nm	P6	Pentium Pro (133 MHz)					
		500 nm	P6	Pentium Pro (150 MHz)					
		350 nm	P6	Pentium Pro (166–200 MHz)					
		350 nm	P6	Klamath					
		250 nm	P6	Deschutes					
		250 nm	P6	Katmai	NetBurst				
		180 nm	P6	Coppermine	Willamette				
		130 nm	P6	Tualatin	Northwood				
		130 nm	Pentium M	Banias	Northwood		NetBurst(HT)		NetBurst(×2)
		90 nm	Pentium M	Dothan	Prescott	⇨	Prescott‑2M	⇨	Smithfield
		90 nm	Pentium M	Dothan	~~Tejas~~	→	⇩	→	~~Cedarmill (Tejas)~~
		65 nm	Pentium M	Yonah	~~Nehalem (NetBurst)~~		Cedar Mill	⇨	Presler
		65 nm	Core	Merom	4 cores on mainstream desktop, DDR3 introduced				
Bonnell	Bonnell	45 nm	Core	Penryn					
Bonnell	Bonnell	45 nm	Nehalem	Nehalem	HT reintroduced, integrated MC, PCH; L3-cache introduced, 256 KB L2-cache/core				
Bonnell	Saltwell	32 nm	Nehalem	Westmere	Introduced GPU on same package and AES-NI				
Bonnell	Saltwell	32 nm	Sandy Bridge	Sandy Bridge	On-die ring bus, no more non-UEFI motherboards				
Silvermont	Silvermont	22 nm	Sandy Bridge	Ivy Bridge					
Silvermont	Silvermont	22 nm	Haswell	Haswell	Fully integrated voltage regulator				
Silvermont	Airmont	14 nm	Haswell	Broadwell					
Silvermont	Airmont	14 nm	Skylake	Skylake	DDR4 introduced on mainstream desktop				
Goldmont	Goldmont	14 nm	Skylake	Kaby Lake					
Goldmont	Goldmont	14 nm	Skylake	Coffee Lake	6 cores on mainstream desktop				
Goldmont	Goldmont	14 nm	Skylake	Amber Lake	Mobile-only				
Goldmont Plus	Goldmont Plus	14 nm	Skylake	Whiskey Lake	Mobile-only				
Goldmont Plus	Goldmont Plus	14 nm	Skylake	Coffee Lake Refresh	8 cores on mainstream desktop				
Goldmont Plus	Goldmont Plus	14 nm	Skylake	Comet Lake	10 cores on mainstream desktop				
Goldmont Plus	Goldmont Plus	14 nm	Sunny Cove	Cypress Cove (Rocket Lake)	Backported Sunny Cove microarchitecture for 14 nm				
Tremont	Tremont	10 nm	Skylake	Palm Cove (Cannon Lake)	Mobile-only				
Tremont	Tremont	10 nm	Sunny Cove	Sunny Cove (Ice Lake)	512 KB L2-cache/core				
Tremont	Tremont	10 nm	Sunny Cove	Willow Cove (Tiger Lake)	X^{e} graphics engine				
Gracemont	Gracemont	Intel 7 (10 nm ESF)	Golden Cove	Golden Cove (Alder Lake)	Hybrid, DDR5, PCIe 5.0				
Gracemont	Gracemont	Intel 7 (10 nm ESF)	Golden Cove	Raptor Cove (Raptor Lake)					
Crestmont	Crestmont	Intel 4	Redwood Cove	Meteor Lake	Mobile-only; NPU, chiplet architecture				
Crestmont	Crestmont	Intel 3	Redwood Cove	Arrow Lake-U					
Skymont	Skymont	N3B (TSMC)	Lion Cove	Lunar Lake	Low power mobile only (9–30 W)				
Skymont	Skymont	N3B (TSMC)	Lion Cove	Arrow Lake					
Darkmont	Darkmont	Intel 18A	Cougar Cove	Panther Lake					

== See also ==
- Core (microarchitecture)
- Kentsfield (microprocessor)
- Wolfdale (microprocessor)
- Penryn (microprocessor)#Penryn-QC
- Harpertown (microprocessor)
- Lynnfield (microprocessor)
- Bloomfield (microprocessor)
- Celeron
- Pentium Dual-Core
- Intel Core 2
