= LGA 1366 =

CPU socket for Intel processors

Socket B
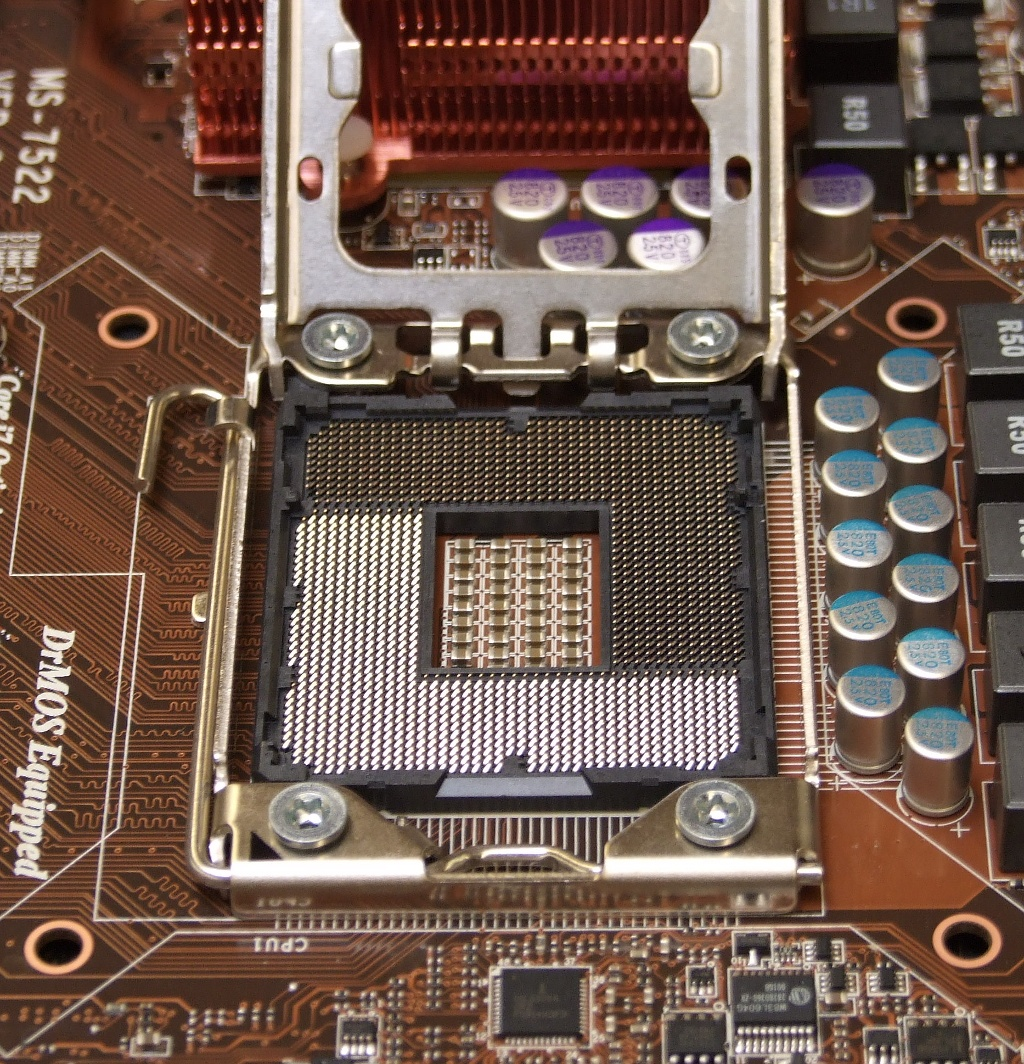
- Release date: 2008 (18 years ago)
- Designed by: Intel
- Type: LGA-ZIF
- Chip form factors: Flip-chip
- Contacts: 1366
- FSB protocol: Intel QuickPath Interconnect
- FSB frequency: 1× to 2× QuickPath
- Processor dimensions: 45.07 mm × 42.57 mm 1,912.5 mm²
- Processors: Intel Core i7 9xx series (2.66 - 3.33 GHz); Intel Xeon 35xx, 36xx, 55xx, 56xx series (1.60 - 3.60 GHz)
- Predecessor: LGA 775 (high-end desktops and low-end servers); LGA 771 (low- and mid-end servers)
- Successor: LGA 2011 (desktops, low- and mid-end servers); LGA 1356 (low-end, dual-processor servers)
- Memory support: DDR3
- This article is part of the CPU socket series

LGA 1366 (land grid array 1366), also known as Socket B, is an Intel CPU socket. This socket supersedes Intel's LGA 775 (Socket T) in the high-end and performance desktop segments. It also replaces the server-oriented LGA 771 (Socket J) in the entry level and is superseded itself by LGA 2011. This socket has 1,366 protruding pins which touch contact points on the underside of the processor (CPU) and accesses up to three channels of DDR3 memory via the processor's internal memory controller.

LGA 1366 (Socket B) uses Intel QuickPath Interconnect (QPI) to connect the CPU to a reduced-function northbridge that serves mainly as a PCI-Express controller. A slower DMI is used to connect Intel's most recent northbridge and southbridge components. By comparison, Intel's LGA 1156 (Socket H) moves the QPI link and PCI-Express controller onto the processor itself, using DMI to interface a single-component "chipset" (now called PCH) that serves traditional southbridge functions. The difference in pin number is mostly a reflection of the number of memory channels served.

Intel started selling LGA 1366 (Socket B) CPUs with the 64-bit version of their 45 nm "Bloomfield"-based Core i7 in November 2008.

LGA 1366 socket and processors were discontinued sometime in early 2012, having been superseded by the LGA 2011 and LGA 1356 socket, on 14 November 2011, supporting Sandy Bridge E-series processors. The accompanying LGA 1156 was discontinued at the same time, which was replaced by LGA 1155.

== Socket B mechanical load limits ==
Socket B processors have the following mechanical maximum load limits which should not be exceeded during heatsink assembly, shipping conditions, or standard use. Load above those limits will crack the processor die and make it unusable. The limits are included in the table below.

Location	Dynamic	Static
IHS Surface	890 N (200 lb_{f}; 90 kp)	266 N (60 lb_{f}; 27 kp)

Processors using this socket have a lower static load limit than previous models using LGA 775. Available reference heat sinks include circular design and heatpipe design.

== Supported chipsets ==
The chipsets that support LGA 1366 are Intel's X58 (desktop) and 3400, 3420, 3450, 5500, 5520 and 7500 (server).

== See also ==
- List of Intel microprocessors
- List of Intel Core i7 microprocessors
- List of Intel Xeon microprocessors
- List of Intel Celeron microprocessors
- CPU socket
- Nehalem (microarchitecture)
- LGA 1156
- LGA 1155
- LGA 2011
