= Wolfdale (microprocessor) =

Intel computer processor

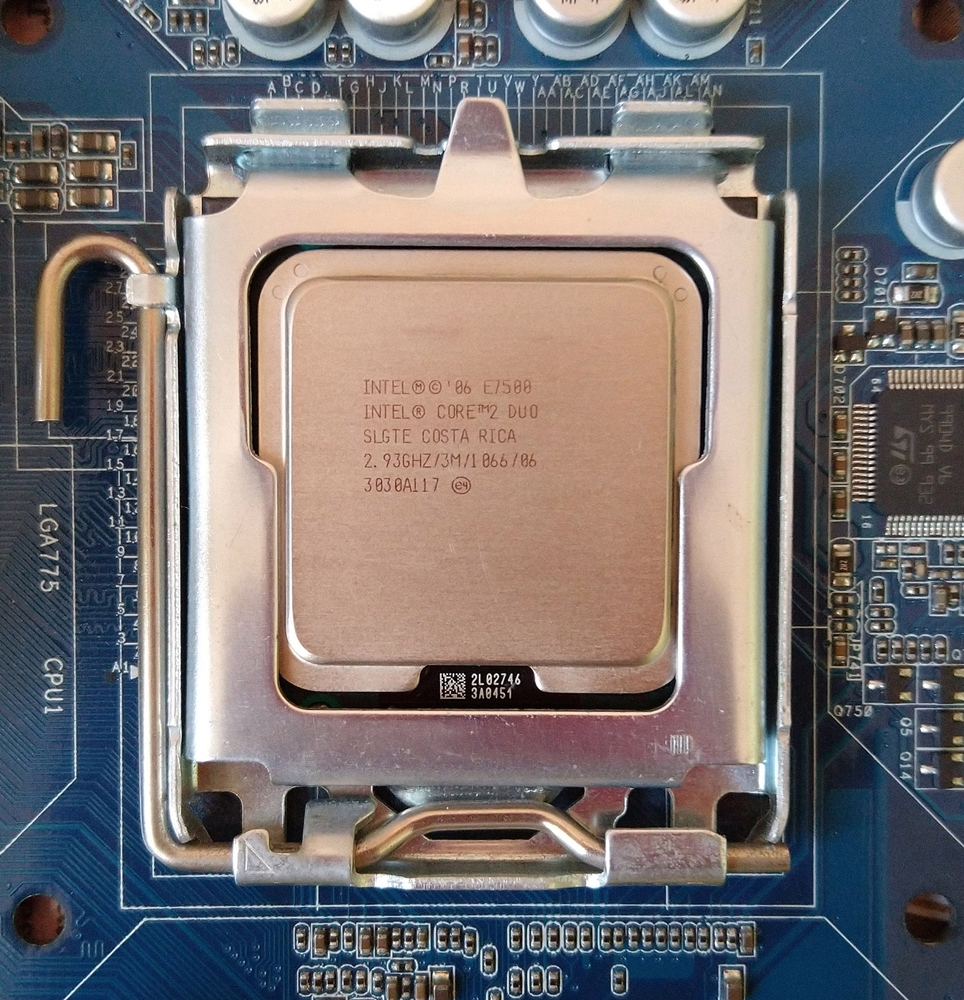
- Core 2 Duo Wolfdale-3M E7500 2.93 GHz

General information
- Launched: 2008 H1
- Discontinued: 2012
- Marketed by: Intel
- Designed by: Intel
- Common manufacturer: Intel
- CPUID code: 1067x
- Product code: Wolfdale: 80570 Wolfdale-3M: 80571 Wolfdale-CL: 80588

Performance
- Max. CPU clock rate: 2.5 GHz to 3.5 GHz
- FSB speeds: 800 MT/s to 1333 MT/s

Cache
- L2 cache: Wolfdale: 6 MB; Wolfdale-3M: 3 MB

Architecture and classification
- Application: Desktop
- Technology node: 45 nm
- Microarchitecture: Penryn
- Instruction set: x86-64

Physical specifications
- Cores: 2
- Sockets: LGA 775; LGA 771

Products, models, variants
- Brand names: Celeron E3xxx; Pentium Dual-Core E5xxx; Pentium E6xxx; Core 2 Duo E7xxx; Core 2 Duo E8xxx; Xeon 31xx; Xeon L3014
- Variants: Yorkfield; Dunnington

History
- Predecessors: Conroe (desktops and uniprocessor servers and workstations); Woodcrest (dual-processor servers)
- Successors: Lynnfield (desktops and uniprocessor servers); Gainstown (dual-processor servers); Bloomfield (uniprocessor workstations)

Support status
- Unsupported

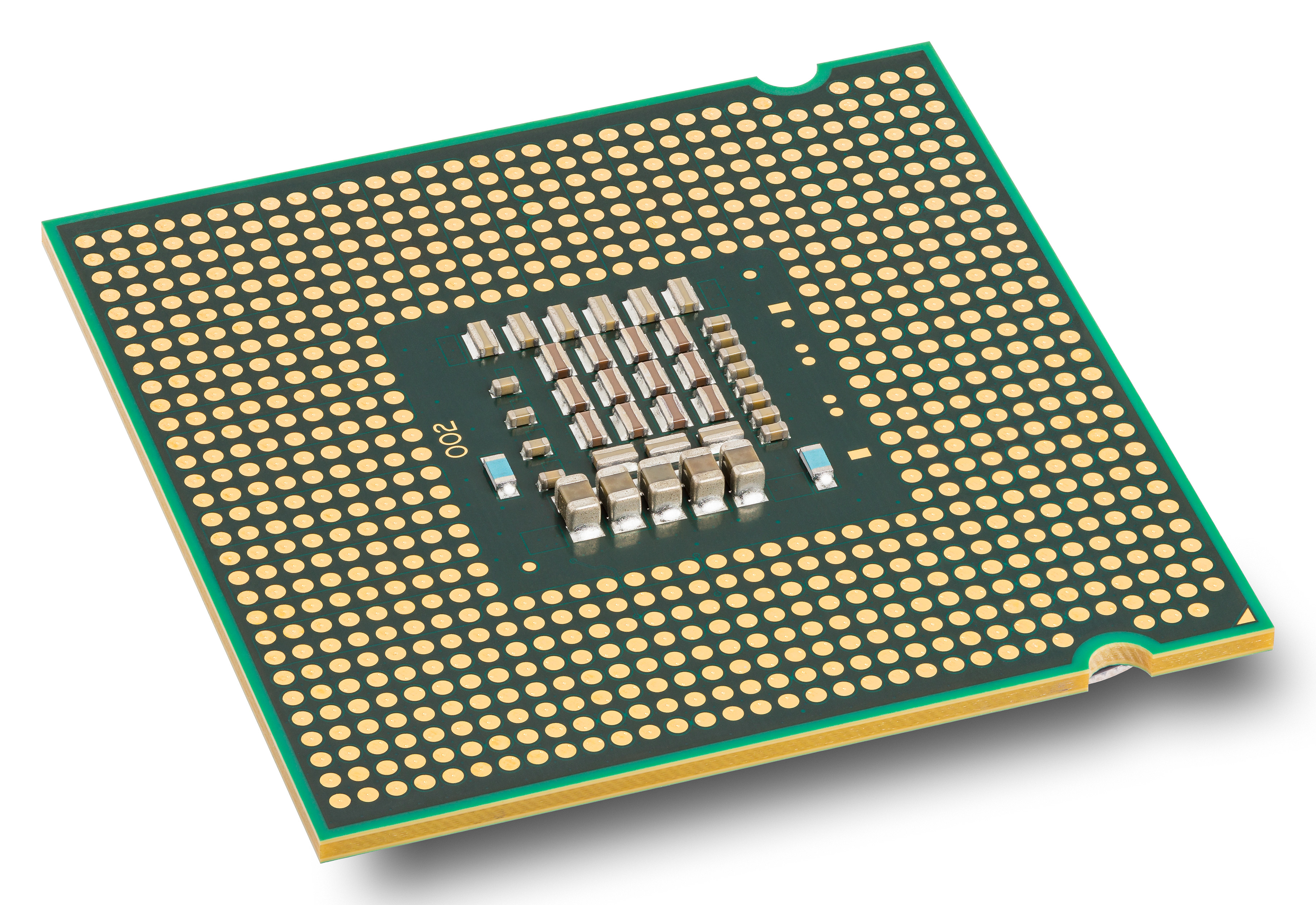
Wolfdale-type Core 2 Duo E8400 perspective view

Wolfdale is the code name for a processor from Intel that is sold in varying configurations as Core 2 Duo, Celeron, Pentium and Xeon. In Intel's Tick-Tock cycle, the 2007/2008 "Tick" was Penryn microarchitecture, the shrink of the Merom microarchitecture to 45 nanometers as CPUID model 23. This replaced the Conroe processor with Wolfdale.

The Wolfdale chips come in four sizes, with 6 MB and 3 MB L2 cache (Core 2 Duo); the smaller version is commonly called Wolfdale-3M, 2 MB L2 (Pentium), and 1 MB L2 (Celeron).

The mobile version of Wolfdale is Penryn and the dual-socket server version is Wolfdale-DP. The Yorkfield desktop processor is a quad-core Multi-chip module of Wolfdale.

Wolfdale was replaced by Nehalem based Clarkdale.

== Variants ==
Processor	Brand Name	Model (list)	Cores	L2 Cache	Socket	TDP
Wolfdale-3M	Celeron	E3xxx	2	1 MB	LGA 775	65 W
Wolfdale-3M	Pentium	E2210	2	1 MB	LGA 775	65 W
Wolfdale-3M	Pentium	E5xxx	2	2 MB	LGA 775	65 W
Wolfdale-3M	Pentium	E6xxx	2	2 MB	LGA 775	65 W
Wolfdale-3M	Core 2 Duo	E7xxx	2	3 MB	LGA 775	65 W
Wolfdale	Core 2 Duo	E8xxx	2	6 MB	LGA 775	65 W
Wolfdale	Xeon	31x0	2	6 MB	LGA 775	45-65 W
Wolfdale-CL	Xeon	30x4	1	6 MB	LGA 771	30 W
Wolfdale-CL	Xeon	31x3	2	6 MB	LGA 771	65 W

=== Wolfdale ===
Wolfdale is the codename for the E8000 series of Core 2 Duo desktop processors and the Xeon 3100 server processor family. Released on January 20, 2008, the chips are manufactured using a 45-nanometer process and feature two processor cores. The Wolfdale models operate at 2.53 GHz, 2.66 GHz, 2.83 GHz, 3.0 GHz, 3.16 GHz, 3.33 GHz, and 3.5 GHz (unreleased Core 2 Duo E8700); the E31x0 and E8xxx series utilizes 6 MB of L2 cache and a 1333 MT/s FSB. These processors include the SSE4.1 media extensions. Wolfdale uses a product code 80570.

=== Wolfdale-3M ===
Wolfdale-3M is the logical successor of Allendale and uses the 82 mm^{2} dies with 3 MB L2 cache similar to Penryn-3M; its product code is 80571. It is used in the Core 2 E7xxx series as well as the E5xxx/E6xxx Pentium Dual-Core and E3xxx Celeron processors. The E5xxx enables only 2 MB of L2 cache, replacing the E2xxx series of Pentium Dual core chips; the E7xxx series uses the full 3 MB of L2 Cache, and a 1066MT/s FSB, replacing the Core 2 Duo E4xxx series; and the Celeron E3xxx series with 1 MB L2 cache enabled is the follow-on to the Celeron E1xxx series.

=== Wolfdale-CL ===
The Xeon L3014 and E3113 processors are Wolfdale-CL with product code 80588, in an LGA 771 package. L3014 has only one core, 3 MB L2 cache and it does not support Intel VT-x, while E3113 is identical to E3110 except that the former fits in an LGA771 socket while the latter fits in LGA775. Both E3113 and E3110 clock to 3Ghz on a 1333Mhz FSB. The Xeon L3014 and E3113 processors do not fit in LGA 775 based mainboards used by mainstream desktop processors but are typically used in single-socket LGA 771 blade servers that otherwise require the more expensive DP server processors. Wolfdale-CL follows an earlier Conroe-CL processor, and Yorkfield-CL is the respective Quad-Core version of Wolfdale-CL.

== Successor ==
Wolfdale was replaced by the 45 nm Nehalem processor.

Atom (ULV)		Node name	Pentium/Core						
Microarch.	Step	Node name	Microarch.	Step					
		600 nm	P6	Pentium Pro (133 MHz)					
		500 nm	P6	Pentium Pro (150 MHz)					
		350 nm	P6	Pentium Pro (166–200 MHz)					
		350 nm	P6	Klamath					
		250 nm	P6	Deschutes					
		250 nm	P6	Katmai	NetBurst				
		180 nm	P6	Coppermine	Willamette				
		130 nm	P6	Tualatin	Northwood				
		130 nm	Pentium M	Banias	Northwood		NetBurst(HT)		NetBurst(×2)
		90 nm	Pentium M	Dothan	Prescott	⇨	Prescott‑2M	⇨	Smithfield
		90 nm	Pentium M	Dothan	~~Tejas~~	→	⇩	→	~~Cedarmill (Tejas)~~
		65 nm	Pentium M	Yonah	~~Nehalem (NetBurst)~~		Cedar Mill	⇨	Presler
		65 nm	Core	Merom	4 cores on mainstream desktop, DDR3 introduced				
Bonnell	Bonnell	45 nm	Core	Penryn					
Bonnell	Bonnell	45 nm	Nehalem	Nehalem	HT reintroduced, integrated MC, PCH; L3-cache introduced, 256KB L2-cache/core				
Bonnell	Saltwell	32 nm	Nehalem	Westmere	Introduced GPU on same package and AES-NI				
Bonnell	Saltwell	32 nm	Sandy Bridge	Sandy Bridge	On-die ring bus, no more non-UEFI motherboards				
Silvermont	Silvermont	22 nm	Sandy Bridge	Ivy Bridge					
Silvermont	Silvermont	22 nm	Haswell	Haswell	Fully integrated voltage regulator				
Silvermont	Airmont	14 nm	Haswell	Broadwell					
Silvermont	Airmont	14 nm	Skylake	Skylake	DDR4 introduced on mainstream desktop				
Goldmont	Goldmont	14 nm	Skylake	Kaby Lake					
Goldmont	Goldmont	14 nm	Skylake	Coffee Lake	6 cores on mainstream desktop				
Goldmont	Goldmont	14 nm	Skylake	Amber Lake	Mobile-only				
Goldmont Plus	Goldmont Plus	14 nm	Skylake	Whiskey Lake	Mobile-only				
Goldmont Plus	Goldmont Plus	14 nm	Skylake	Coffee Lake Refresh	8 cores on mainstream desktop				
Goldmont Plus	Goldmont Plus	14 nm	Skylake	Comet Lake	10 cores on mainstream desktop				
Goldmont Plus	Goldmont Plus	14 nm	Sunny Cove	Cypress Cove (Rocket Lake)	Backported Sunny Cove microarchitecture for 14nm				
Tremont	Tremont	10 nm	Skylake	Palm Cove (Cannon Lake)	Mobile-only				
Tremont	Tremont	10 nm	Sunny Cove	Sunny Cove (Ice Lake)	512 KB L2-cache/core				
Tremont	Tremont	10 nm	Sunny Cove	Willow Cove (Tiger Lake)	X^{e} graphics engine				
Gracemont	Gracemont	Intel 7 (10nm ESF)	Golden Cove	Golden Cove (Alder Lake)	Hybrid, DDR5, PCIe 5.0				
Gracemont	Gracemont	Intel 7 (10nm ESF)	Golden Cove	Raptor Cove (Raptor Lake)					
Crestmont	Crestmont	Intel 4	Redwood Cove	Meteor Lake	Mobile-only; NPU, chiplet architecture				
Crestmont	Crestmont	Intel 3	Redwood Cove	Arrow Lake-U					
Skymont	Skymont	N3B (TSMC)	Lion Cove	Lunar Lake	Low power mobile only (9-30W)				
Skymont	Skymont	N3B (TSMC)	Lion Cove	Arrow Lake					
Darkmont	Darkmont	Intel 18A	Cougar Cove	Panther Lake					

== See also ==
- Core (microarchitecture)
- Conroe (microprocessor)
- Yorkfield (microprocessor)
- Wolfdale-DP (microprocessor)
- Penryn (microprocessor)
- Lynnfield (microprocessor)
- Celeron
- Pentium Dual-Core
- Intel Core 2
- List of Macintosh models grouped by CPU type
