= Penryn (microarchitecture) =

2007 CPU microarchitecture by Intel

General information
- Launched: November 2007; 19 years ago

Performance
- Max. CPU clock rate: 1.06 GHz to 3.33 GHz
- FSB speeds: 533 MT/s to 1600 MT/s

Physical specifications
- Transistors: 228M to 820M 45 nm
- Cores: 1-4 (2-6 Xeon)
- Sockets: Socket M (μPGA 478); Socket P (μPGA 478); Socket T (LGA 775); FCBGA (μBGA 479); FCBGA (μBGA 965)

Cache
- L1 cache: 64 KB per core
- L2 cache: 1 MB to 12 MB unified
- L3 cache: 8 MB to 16 MB shared (Xeon)

Architecture and classification
- Microarchitecture: Core
- Instruction set: x86-16, IA-32, x86-64
- Extensions: MMX, SSE, SSE2, SSE3, SSSE3, SSE4.1; VT-x, VT-d

Products, models, variants
- Model: P6 Family (Celeron, Pentium, Pentium Dual-Core, Core 2 range, Xeon)

History
- Predecessor: Core
- Successor: Nehalem

Support status
- Unsupported

Penryn in Intel's Tick-Tock cycle was the 2007/2008 "Tick" die shrink of the Core microarchitecture to 45 nanometers as CPUID model 23. In Core 2 processors, it is used with the code names Penryn (Socket P), Wolfdale (LGA 775) and Yorkfield (MCM, LGA 775), some of which are also sold as Celeron, Pentium and Xeon processors. In the Xeon brand, the Wolfdale-DP and Harpertown code names are used for LGA 771 based MCMs with two or four active Wolfdale cores.

== Architecture ==
Architectural improvements over the 65-nanometer Core 2 CPUs include a new divider with reduced latency, a new shuffle engine, and SSE4.1 instructions (some of which are enabled by the new single-cycle shuffle engine).

Maximum L2 cache size per chip was increased from 4 to 6 MB, with L2 associativity increased from 16-way to 24-way. Cut-down versions with 3 MB L2 also exist, which are commonly called Penryn-3M and Wolfdale-3M as well as Yorkfield-6M, respectively. The single-core version of Penryn, listed as Penryn-L here, is not a separate model like Merom-L but a version of the Penryn-3M model with only one active core.

== CPU List ==
Processor	Brand name	Model (list)	Cores	L2 Cache	Socket	TDP
Penryn-L	Core 2 Solo	SU3xxx	1	3 MB	BGA956	5.5 W
Penryn-3M	Core 2 Duo	SU7xxx	2	3 MB	BGA956	10 W
Penryn-3M	Core 2 Duo	SU9xxx	2	3 MB	BGA956	10 W
Penryn	Core 2 Duo	SL9xxx	2	6 MB	BGA956	17 W
Penryn	Core 2 Duo	SP9xxx	2	6 MB	BGA956	25/28 W
Penryn-3M	Core 2 Duo	P7xxx	2	3 MB	Socket P FCBGA6	25 W
Penryn-3M	Core 2 Duo	P8xxx	2	3 MB	Socket P FCBGA6	25 W
Penryn	Core 2 Duo	P9xxx	2	6 MB	Socket P FCBGA6	25 W
Penryn-3M	Core 2 Duo	T6xxx	2	2 MB	Socket P FCBGA6	35 W
Penryn-3M	Core 2 Duo	T8xxx	2	3 MB	Socket P FCBGA6	35 W
Penryn	Core 2 Duo	T9xxx	2	6 MB	Socket P FCBGA6	35 W
Penryn	Core 2 Duo	E8x35	2	6 MB	Socket P	35-55 W
Penryn-QC	Core 2 Quad	Q9xxx	4	2x3-2x6 MB	Socket P	45 W
Penryn XE	Core 2 Extreme	X9xxx	2	6 MB	Socket P	44 W
Penryn-QC	Core 2 Extreme	QX9xxx	4	2x6 MB	Socket P	45 W
Penryn-3M	Celeron	T3xxx	2	1 MB	Socket P	35 W
Penryn-3M	Celeron	SU2xxx	2	1 MB	μFC-BGA 956	10 W
Penryn-L	Celeron	9x0	1	1 MB	Socket P	35 W
Penryn-L	Celeron	7x3	1	1 MB	μFC-BGA 956	10 W
Penryn-3M	Pentium	T4xxx	2	1 MB	Socket P	35 W
Penryn-3M	Pentium	SU4xxx	2	2 MB	μFC-BGA 956	10 W
Penryn-L	Pentium	SU2xxx	1	2 MB	μFC-BGA 956	5.5 W
Wolfdale-3M
Wolfdale-3M	Celeron	E3xxx	2	1 MB	LGA 775	65 W
Wolfdale-3M	Pentium	E2210	2	1 MB	LGA 775	65 W
Wolfdale-3M	Pentium	E5xxx	2	2 MB	LGA 775	65 W
Wolfdale-3M	Pentium	E6xxx	2	2 MB	LGA 775	65 W
Wolfdale-3M	Core 2 Duo	E7xxx	2	3 MB	LGA 775	65 W
Wolfdale	Core 2 Duo	E8xxx	2	6 MB	LGA 775	65 W
Wolfdale	Xeon	31x0	2	6 MB	LGA 775	45-65 W
Wolfdale-CL	Xeon	30x4	1	6 MB	LGA 771	30 W
Wolfdale-CL	Xeon	31x3	2	6 MB	LGA 771	65 W
Yorkfield	Xeon	X33x0	4	2×3–2×6 MB	LGA 775	65–95 W
Yorkfield-CL	Xeon	X33x3	4	2×3–2×6 MB	LGA 771	80 W
Yorkfield-6M	Core 2 Quad	Q8xxx	4	2×2 MB	LGA 775	65–95 W
Yorkfield-6M	Core 2 Quad	Q9x0x	4	2×3 MB	LGA 775	65–95 W
Yorkfield	Core 2 Quad	Q9x5x	4	2×6 MB	LGA 775	65–95 W
Yorkfield XE	Core 2 Extreme	QX9xxx	4	2×6 MB	LGA 775	130–136 W
Yorkfield XE	Core 2 Extreme	QX9xx5	4	2×6 MB	LGA 771	150 W
Wolfdale-DP	Xeon	E52xx	2	6 MB	LGA 771	65 W
Wolfdale-DP	Xeon	L52xx	2	6 MB	LGA 771	20-55 W
Wolfdale-DP	Xeon	X52xx	2	6 MB	LGA 771	80 W
Harpertown	Xeon	E54xx	4	2×6 MB	LGA 771	80 W
Harpertown	Xeon	L54xx	4	2×6 MB	LGA 771	40-50 W
Harpertown	Xeon	X54xx	4	2×6 MB	LGA 771	120-150 W

== Processor cores ==
The processors of the Core microarchitecture can be categorized by number of cores, cache size, and socket; each combination of these has a unique code name and product code that is used across a number of brands. For instance, code name "Allendale" with product code 80557 has two cores, 2 MB L2 cache and uses the desktop socket 775, but has been marketed as Celeron, Pentium, Core 2 and Xeon, each with different sets of features enabled. Most of the mobile and desktop processors come in two variants that differ in the size of the L2 cache, but the specific amount of L2 cache in a product can also be reduced by disabling parts at production time. Wolfdale-DP and all quad-core processors except Dunnington QC are multi-chip modules combining two dies. For the 65 nm processors, the same product code can be shared by processors with different dies, but the specific information about which one is used can be derived from the stepping.

	fab	cores	Mobile		Desktop, UP Server		CL Server	DP Server	MP Server
Single-Core 45 nm	45 nm	1		Penryn-L; 80585				Wolfdale-CL; 80588	
Dual-Core 45 nm	45 nm	2	Penryn-3M; 80577	Penryn; 80576	Wolfdale-3M; 80571	Wolfdale; 80570	Wolfdale-CL; 80588	Wolfdale-DP; 80573	
Quad-Core 45 nm	45 nm	4		Penryn-QC; 80581	Yorkfield-6M; 80580	Yorkfield; 80569	Yorkfield-CL; 80584	Harpertown; 80574	Dunnington QC; 80583
Six-Core 45 nm	45 nm	6							Dunnington; 80582

=== Steppings using 45 nm process ===
						Mobile (Penryn)			Desktop (Wolfdale)				Desktop (Yorkfield)		Server (Wolfdale-DP, Harpertown, Dunnington)
Stepping	Released	Area	CPUID	L2 cache	Max. clock	Celeron	Pentium	Core 2	Celeron	Pentium	Core 2	Xeon	Core 2	Xeon	Xeon
C0	Nov 2007	107 mm^{2}	10676	6 MB	3.00 GHz			E8000 P7000 T8000 T9000 P9000 SP9000 SL9000 X9000			E8000	3100	QX9000		5200 5400
M0	Mar 2008	82 mm^{2}	10676	3 MB	2.40 GHz	7xx		SU3000 P7000 P8000 T8000 SU9000		E5000 E2000	E7000				
C1	Mar 2008	107 mm^{2}	10677	6 MB	3.20 GHz								Q9000 QX9000	3300	
M1	Mar 2008	82 mm^{2}	10677	3 MB	2.50 GHz								Q8000 Q9000	3300	
E0	Aug 2008	107 mm^{2}	1067A	6 MB	3.33 GHz			T9000 P9000 SP9000 SL9000 Q9000 QX9000			E8000	3100	Q9000 Q9000S QX9000	3300	5200 5400
R0	Aug 2008	82 mm^{2}	1067A	3 MB	2.93 GHz	7xx 900 SU2000 T3000	T4000 SU2000 SU4000	SU3000 T6000 SU7000 P8000 SU9000	E3000	E5000 E6000	E7000		Q8000 Q8000S Q9000 Q9000S	3300	
A1	Sep 2008	503 mm^{2}	106D1	3 MB	2.67 GHz										7400

In the model 23 (cpuid 01067xh), Intel started marketing stepping with full (6 MB) and reduced (3 MB) L2 cache at the same time, and giving them identical cpuid values. All steppings have the newer SSE4.1 instructions. Stepping C1/M1 was a bug fix version of C0/M0 specifically for quad core processors and only used in those. Stepping E0/R0 adds two new instructions (XSAVE/XRSTOR) and replaces all earlier steppings.

In mobile processors, stepping C0/M0 is only used in the Intel Mobile 965 Express (Santa Rosa refresh) platform, whereas stepping E0/R0 supports the later Intel Mobile 4 Express (Montevina) platform.

Model 29 stepping A1 (cpuid 106d1h) adds an L3 cache as well as six instead of the usual two cores, which leads to an unusually large die size of 503 mm^{2}. As of February 2008, it has only found its way into the very high-end Xeon 7400 series (Dunnington).

== Roadmap ==
Atom (ULV)		Node name	Pentium/Core						
Microarch.	Step	Node name	Microarch.	Step					
		600 nm	P6	Pentium Pro (133 MHz)					
		500 nm	P6	Pentium Pro (150 MHz)					
		350 nm	P6	Pentium Pro (166–200 MHz)					
		350 nm	P6	Klamath					
		250 nm	P6	Deschutes					
		250 nm	P6	Katmai	NetBurst				
		180 nm	P6	Coppermine	Willamette				
		130 nm	P6	Tualatin	Northwood				
		130 nm	Pentium M (P6)	Banias	Northwood		NetBurst(HT)		NetBurst(×2)
		90 nm	Pentium M (P6)	Dothan	Prescott	⇨	Prescott‑2M	⇨	Smithfield
		90 nm	Pentium M (P6)	Dothan	~~Tejas~~	→	⇩	→	~~Cedarmill (Tejas)~~
		65 nm	Pentium M (P6)	Yonah	~~Nehalem (NetBurst)~~		Cedar Mill	⇨	Presler
		65 nm	Core	Merom	4 cores on mainstream desktop, DDR3 introduced				
Bonnell	Bonnell	45 nm	Core	Penryn					
Bonnell	Bonnell	45 nm	Nehalem	Nehalem	HT reintroduced, integrated MC, PCH; L3-cache introduced, 256 KB L2-cache/core				
Bonnell	Saltwell	32 nm	Nehalem	Westmere	Introduced GPU on same package and AES-NI				
Bonnell	Saltwell	32 nm	Sandy Bridge	Sandy Bridge	On-die ring bus, no more non-UEFI motherboards				
Silvermont	Silvermont	22 nm	Sandy Bridge	Ivy Bridge					
Silvermont	Silvermont	22 nm	Haswell	Haswell	Fully integrated voltage regulator				
Silvermont	Airmont	14 nm	Haswell	Broadwell					
Silvermont	Airmont	14 nm	Skylake	Skylake	DDR4 introduced on mainstream desktop				
Goldmont		14 nm	Skylake	Kaby Lake					
Goldmont		14 nm	Skylake	Coffee Lake	6 cores on mainstream desktop				
Goldmont		14 nm	Skylake	Amber Lake	Mobile-only				
Goldmont Plus		14 nm	Skylake	Whiskey Lake	Mobile-only				
Goldmont Plus		14 nm	Skylake	Coffee Lake Refresh	8 cores on mainstream desktop				
Goldmont Plus		14 nm	Skylake	Comet Lake	10 cores on mainstream desktop				
Goldmont Plus		14 nm	Sunny Cove	Cypress Cove (Rocket Lake)	Backported Sunny Cove microarchitecture for 14 nm				
Tremont		10 nm	Skylake	Palm Cove (Cannon Lake)	Mobile-only				
Tremont		10 nm	Sunny Cove	Sunny Cove (Ice Lake)	512 KB L2-cache/core				
Tremont		10 nm	Sunny Cove	Willow Cove (Tiger Lake)	X^{e} graphics engine				
Gracemont		Intel 7 (10 nm ESF)	Golden Cove	Golden Cove (Alder Lake)	Hybrid, DDR5, PCIe 5.0				
Gracemont		Intel 7 (10 nm ESF)	Golden Cove	Raptor Cove (Raptor Lake)					
Crestmont		Intel 4	Redwood Cove	Meteor Lake	Mobile-only; NPU, chiplet architecture				
Crestmont		Intel 3	Redwood Cove	Arrow Lake-U					
Skymont		TSMC N3B	Lion Cove	Lunar Lake	Low power mobile only (9–30 W)				
Skymont		TSMC N3B	Lion Cove	Arrow Lake					
Darkmont		Intel 18A	Cougar Cove	Panther Lake					
Arctic Wolf		Intel 18A and/or TSMC N2P	Coyote Cove	Nova Lake					

== See also ==
- x86 architecture
- List of Intel CPU microarchitectures
- Tick-Tock model

Atom (ULV)		Node name	Pentium/Core						
Microarch.	Step	Node name	Microarch.	Step					
		600 nm	P6	Pentium Pro (133 MHz)					
		500 nm	P6	Pentium Pro (150 MHz)					
		350 nm	P6	Pentium Pro (166–200 MHz)					
		350 nm	P6	Klamath					
		250 nm	P6	Deschutes					
		250 nm	P6	Katmai	NetBurst				
		180 nm	P6	Coppermine	Willamette				
		130 nm	P6	Tualatin	Northwood				
		130 nm	Pentium M (P6)	Banias	Northwood		NetBurst(HT)		NetBurst(×2)
		90 nm	Pentium M (P6)	Dothan	Prescott	⇨	Prescott‑2M	⇨	Smithfield
		90 nm	Pentium M (P6)	Dothan	~~Tejas~~	→	⇩	→	~~Cedarmill (Tejas)~~
		65 nm	Pentium M (P6)	Yonah	~~Nehalem (NetBurst)~~		Cedar Mill	⇨	Presler
		65 nm	Core	Merom	4 cores on mainstream desktop, DDR3 introduced				
Bonnell	Bonnell	45 nm	Core	Penryn					
Bonnell	Bonnell	45 nm	Nehalem	Nehalem	HT reintroduced, integrated MC, PCH; L3-cache introduced, 256 KB L2-cache/core				
Bonnell	Saltwell	32 nm	Nehalem	Westmere	Introduced GPU on same package and AES-NI				
Bonnell	Saltwell	32 nm	Sandy Bridge	Sandy Bridge	On-die ring bus, no more non-UEFI motherboards				
Silvermont	Silvermont	22 nm	Sandy Bridge	Ivy Bridge					
Silvermont	Silvermont	22 nm	Haswell	Haswell	Fully integrated voltage regulator				
Silvermont	Airmont	14 nm	Haswell	Broadwell					
Silvermont	Airmont	14 nm	Skylake	Skylake	DDR4 introduced on mainstream desktop				
Goldmont		14 nm	Skylake	Kaby Lake					
Goldmont		14 nm	Skylake	Coffee Lake	6 cores on mainstream desktop				
Goldmont		14 nm	Skylake	Amber Lake	Mobile-only				
Goldmont Plus		14 nm	Skylake	Whiskey Lake	Mobile-only				
Goldmont Plus		14 nm	Skylake	Coffee Lake Refresh	8 cores on mainstream desktop				
Goldmont Plus		14 nm	Skylake	Comet Lake	10 cores on mainstream desktop				
Goldmont Plus		14 nm	Sunny Cove	Cypress Cove (Rocket Lake)	Backported Sunny Cove microarchitecture for 14 nm				
Tremont		10 nm	Skylake	Palm Cove (Cannon Lake)	Mobile-only				
Tremont		10 nm	Sunny Cove	Sunny Cove (Ice Lake)	512 KB L2-cache/core				
Tremont		10 nm	Sunny Cove	Willow Cove (Tiger Lake)	X^{e} graphics engine				
Gracemont		Intel 7 (10 nm ESF)	Golden Cove	Golden Cove (Alder Lake)	Hybrid, DDR5, PCIe 5.0				
Gracemont		Intel 7 (10 nm ESF)	Golden Cove	Raptor Cove (Raptor Lake)					
Crestmont		Intel 4	Redwood Cove	Meteor Lake	Mobile-only; NPU, chiplet architecture				
Crestmont		Intel 3	Redwood Cove	Arrow Lake-U					
Skymont		TSMC N3B	Lion Cove	Lunar Lake	Low power mobile only (9–30 W)				
Skymont		TSMC N3B	Lion Cove	Arrow Lake					
Darkmont		Intel 18A	Cougar Cove	Panther Lake					
Arctic Wolf		Intel 18A and/or TSMC N2P	Coyote Cove	Nova Lake					
