= Kentsfield (microprocessor) =

Intel processor microarchitecture

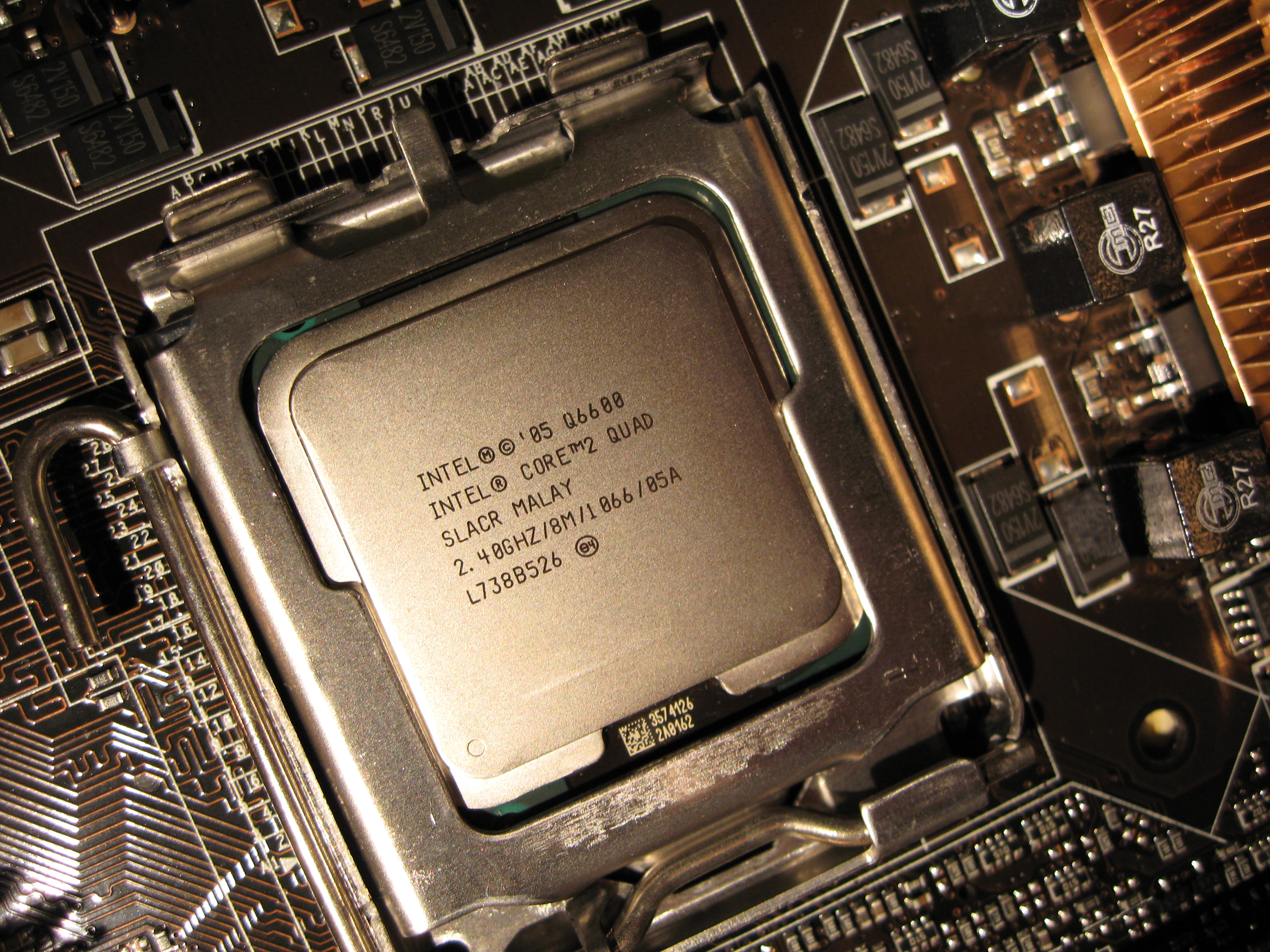
- Intel Core 2 Quad Kentsfield Q6600

General information
- Launched: November 2, 2006
- Discontinued: 2009
- Marketed by: Intel
- Designed by: Intel
- Common manufacturer: Intel
- CPUID code: 06Fx
- Product code: 80562

Performance
- Max. CPU clock rate: 0.09 GHz to 3.00 GHz
- FSB speeds: 1066 MT/s to 1333 MT/s

Physical specifications
- Cores: 4
- Socket: LGA 775

Cache
- L2 cache: 2 × 4 MiB

Architecture and classification
- Application: Desktop, UP Server
- Technology node: 65 nm
- Microarchitecture: Core
- Instruction set: x86-64

Products, models, variants
- Brand names: Core 2 Quad Q6xxx; Core 2 Extreme QX6xxx; Xeon 32xx
- Variant: Clovertown

History
- Predecessor: Presler
- Successor: Yorkfield

Kentsfield is the code name of the first Intel desktop Core 2 Quad and quad-core Xeon CPUs, released on November 2, 2006. The top-of-the-line Kentsfields were Core 2 Extreme models numbered QX6xx0, while the mainstream Core 2 Quad models were numbered Q6x00. All of them featured two 8 MiB L2 cache. The mainstream 65 nanometer Core 2 Quad Q6600, clocked at 2.4 GHz, was launched on January 8, 2007 at US$851 (reduced to US$530 on April 7, 2007). July 22, 2007 marked the release of the Core 2 Quad Q6700 and Core 2 Extreme QX6850 Kentsfields at US$530 and US$999 respectively; the price of the Q6600 was later reduced to US$266. Both Kentsfield and Kentsfield XE use product code 80562.

== Variants ==
Processor	Brand name	Model (list)	Clock Rate	Cores	L2 cache	Socket	TDP
Kentsfield	Xeon	3xxx	2.13 - 2.67 GHz	4	2 × 4 MiB	LGA 775	95–105 W
Clovertown	Xeon	5xxx	1.6 - 3 GHz	4	2 × 4 MiB	LGA 775	95–105 W
Kentsfield	Core 2 Quad	Q6xxx	2.13 - 2.67 GHz	4	2 × 4 MiB	LGA 775	95–105 W
Kentsfield XE	Core 2 Extreme	QX6xxx	2.67 - 3 GHz	4	2 × 4 MiB	LGA 775	130 W

=== Kentsfield ===
Analogous to the Pentium D branded CPUs, the Kentsfields comprise two separate silicon dies (each equivalent to a single Core 2 Duo) on one MCM. This results in lower costs, but a lesser share of the bandwidth from each of the CPUs to the northbridge than if the dies were each to sit in separate sockets as is the case for the AMD Quad FX platform. As might be predicted from the two-die MCM configuration, the thermal design power of the Kentsfield (QX6800 - 130 watts, QX6700 - 130 W, Q6600 - 105 W) is double that of its similarly clocked Core 2 Duo counterpart.

The multiple cores of the Kentsfield mostly benefits applications that can easily be broken into a small number of parallel threads (such as audio and video transcoding, data compression, video editing, 3D rendering and ray-tracing). To take a specific example, multi-threaded games such as Crysis and Gears of War which must perform multiple simultaneous tasks such as AI, audio and physics benefit from quad-core CPUs. In such cases, the processing performance may increase relative to that of a single-CPU system by a factor approaching the number of CPUs. This should, however, be considered an upper limit as it assumes that the user-level software is properly threaded. Alternatively, if the system uses integrated graphics with no or limited shader support (such as Intel's GMA 9xx and 31xx series), and a game uses only 1 or 2 cores, the extra cores could be given the task of emulating pixel and or vertex shading, improving the game's graphics quality. Since the L2 cache is separated in two parts, one for each dual core module, this would also make parallelizing the shading and other general purpose tasks easier compared to on single die quad core CPUs with fully shared L2 cache.

To return to the above mentioned gaming example, some tests have demonstrated that Crysis fails to take advantage of more than two cores at any given time. On the other hand, the impact of this issue on broader system performance can be significantly reduced on systems which frequently handle numerous unrelated simultaneous tasks such as multi-user environments or desktops which execute background processes while the user is active, or even video encoding if hardware encoding is not available or not desired (software encoding can be more bitrate efficient than hardware encoding) and there are resources available for it. There is still, however, some overhead involved in coordinating execution of multiple processes or threads and scheduling them on multiple CPUs which scales with the number of threads/CPUs. Finally, on the hardware level there exists the possibility of bottlenecks arising from the sharing of memory and/or I/O bandwidth between processors.

=== Kentsfield XE ===
The first Kentsfield XE processor, the Core 2 Extreme QX6700 (product code 80562) with a clock speed of 2.67 GHz, was released on November 2, 2006 at US$999. It was discontinued on January 4, 2008. It featured the Kentsfield XE core and complemented the Core 2 Extreme X6800 dual-core processor based on the Conroe XE core. Similarly to the previous dual-core Extreme processors, CPUs with the Kentsfield XE core had unlocked multipliers.

The Core 2 Extreme QX6800 clocked at 2.93 GHz was released on April 8, 2007, at US$1,199. It had a 130 W TDP thermal envelope, and was intended for high end OEM-only systems.

The Core 2 Extreme QX6850 clocked at 3.0 GHz was launched on July 22, 2007, at US$999. It featured a faster 1333 MT/s FSB. Simultaneously, the previously available Core 2 Extreme QX6700 had its price reduced.

== Related processors ==
The dual-core desktop version of Kentsfield is Conroe. The server versions of Kentsfield are the dual-processor Clovertown (Xeon 53xx) and the multi-processor Tigerton (Xeon 73xx).

== Successor ==
Kentsfield was replaced by the 45 nm Yorkfield processor.

Atom (ULV)		Node name	Pentium/Core						
Microarch.	Step	Node name	Microarch.	Step					
		600 nm	P6	Pentium Pro (133 MHz)					
		500 nm	P6	Pentium Pro (150 MHz)					
		350 nm	P6	Pentium Pro (166–200 MHz)					
		350 nm	P6	Klamath					
		250 nm	P6	Deschutes					
		250 nm	P6	Katmai	NetBurst				
		180 nm	P6	Coppermine	Willamette				
		130 nm	P6	Tualatin	Northwood				
		130 nm	Pentium M	Banias	Northwood		NetBurst(HT)		NetBurst(×2)
		90 nm	Pentium M	Dothan	Prescott	⇨	Prescott‑2M	⇨	Smithfield
		90 nm	Pentium M	Dothan	~~Tejas~~	→	⇩	→	~~Cedarmill (Tejas)~~
		65 nm	Pentium M	Yonah	~~Nehalem (NetBurst)~~		Cedar Mill	⇨	Presler
		65 nm	Core	Merom	4 cores on mainstream desktop, DDR3 introduced				
Bonnell	Bonnell	45 nm	Core	Penryn					
Bonnell	Bonnell	45 nm	Nehalem	Nehalem	HT reintroduced, integrated MC, PCH; L3-cache introduced, 256 KB L2-cache/core				
Bonnell	Saltwell	32 nm	Nehalem	Westmere	Introduced GPU on same package and AES-NI				
Bonnell	Saltwell	32 nm	Sandy Bridge	Sandy Bridge	On-die ring bus, no more non-UEFI motherboards				
Silvermont	Silvermont	22 nm	Sandy Bridge	Ivy Bridge					
Silvermont	Silvermont	22 nm	Haswell	Haswell	Fully integrated voltage regulator				
Silvermont	Airmont	14 nm	Haswell	Broadwell					
Silvermont	Airmont	14 nm	Skylake	Skylake	DDR4 introduced on mainstream desktop				
Goldmont		14 nm	Skylake	Kaby Lake					
Goldmont		14 nm	Skylake	Coffee Lake	6 cores on mainstream desktop				
Goldmont		14 nm	Skylake	Amber Lake	Mobile-only				
Goldmont Plus		14 nm	Skylake	Whiskey Lake	Mobile-only				
Goldmont Plus		14 nm	Skylake	Coffee Lake Refresh	8 cores on mainstream desktop				
Goldmont Plus		14 nm	Skylake	Comet Lake	10 cores on mainstream desktop				
Goldmont Plus		14 nm	Sunny Cove	Cypress Cove (Rocket Lake)	Backported Sunny Cove microarchitecture for 14 nm				
Tremont		10 nm	Skylake	Palm Cove (Cannon Lake)	Mobile-only				
Tremont		10 nm	Sunny Cove	Sunny Cove (Ice Lake)	512 KB L2-cache/core				
Tremont		10 nm	Sunny Cove	Willow Cove (Tiger Lake)	X^{e} graphics engine				
Gracemont		Intel 7 (10 nm ESF)	Golden Cove	Golden Cove (Alder Lake)	Hybrid, DDR5, PCIe 5.0				
Gracemont		Intel 7 (10 nm ESF)	Golden Cove	Raptor Cove (Raptor Lake)					
Crestmont		Intel 4	Redwood Cove	Meteor Lake	Mobile-only; NPU, chiplet architecture				
Crestmont		Intel 3	Redwood Cove	Arrow Lake-U					
Skymont		TSMC N3B	Lion Cove	Lunar Lake	Low power mobile only (9–30 W)				
Skymont		TSMC N3B	Lion Cove	Arrow Lake					
Darkmont		Intel 18A	Cougar Cove	Panther Lake					
Arctic Wolf		Intel 18A and/or TSMC N2P	Coyote Cove	Nova Lake					
