= Conroe (microprocessor) =

Code name for several Intel processors

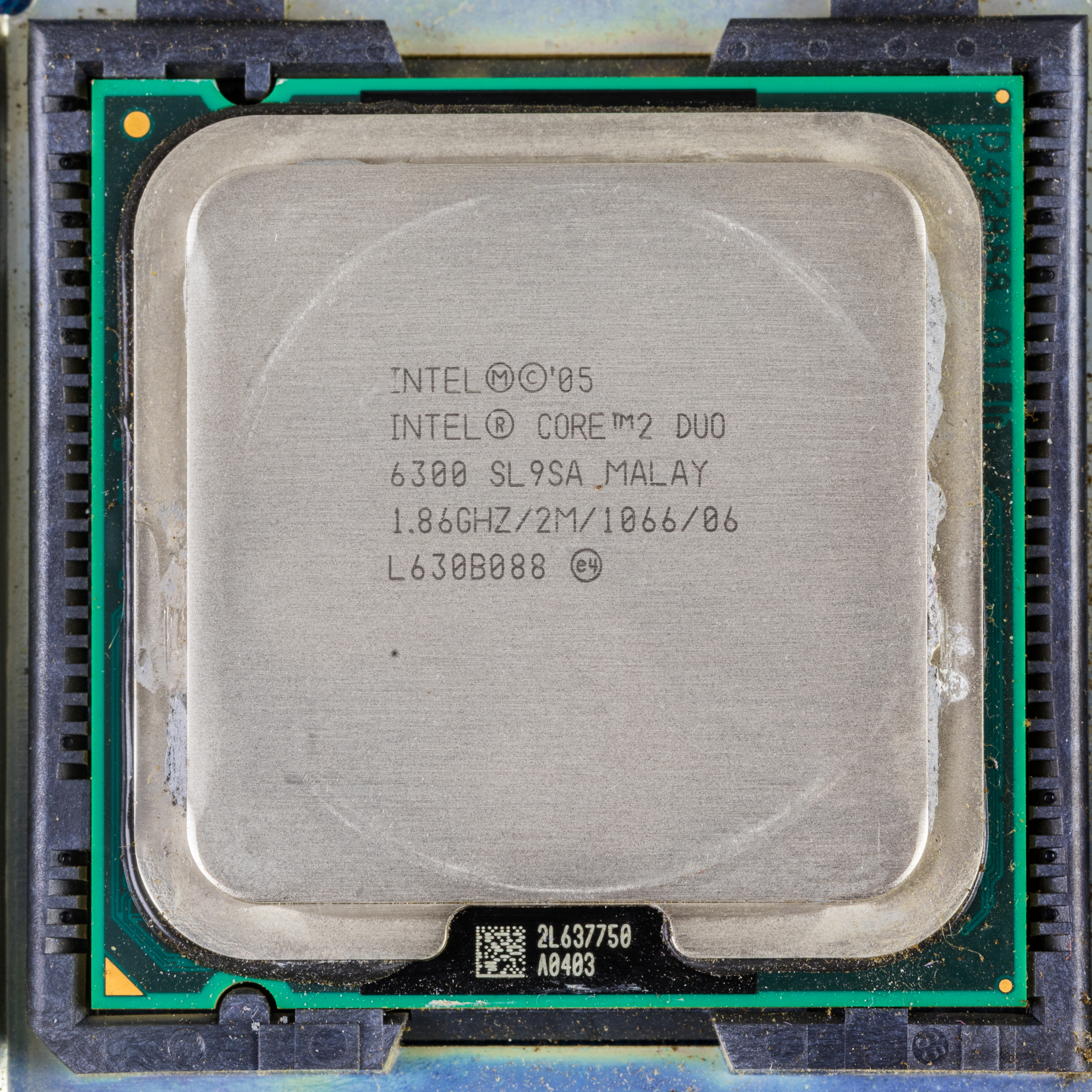
- Intel Core 2 Duo E6300

General information
- Launched: July 2006
- Discontinued: December 2009
- Marketed by: Intel
- Designed by: Intel
- Common manufacturer: Intel
- CPUID code: 06Fx (Conroe-L: 1066x)
- Product code: 80557

Performance
- Max. CPU clock rate: 1.2 GHz to 3.5 GHz
- FSB speeds: 800 MT/s to 1333 MT/s

Cache
- L1 cache: 128 KB (64 KB (32 KB instructions + 32 KB data) x2)
- L2 cache: Allendale: 2 MB; Conroe: 4 MB; Conroe-L: 512 KB

Architecture and classification
- Application: Dual-core desktop
- Technology node: 65 nm
- Microarchitecture: Core
- Instruction set: x86, x86-64

Physical specifications
- Cores: 2 (Conroe-L: 1)
- Sockets: LGA 775; LGA 771

Products, models, variants
- Brand names: Celeron 4xx; Celeron E1xxx; Pentium Dual-Core E2xxx; Core 2 Duo E4xxx; Core 2 Duo E6xxx; Xeon 30xx
- Variants: Woodcrest; Kentsfield; Clovertown; Tigerton; Merom

History
- Predecessors: Cedar Mill (uniprocessor, single core); Presler (uniprocessor, dual-core)
- Successor: Wolfdale

Support status
- Unsupported

Conroe is the code name for many Intel processors sold as Core 2 Duo, Xeon, Pentium Dual-Core and Celeron. It was the first desktop processor to be based on the Core microarchitecture, replacing the NetBurst microarchitecture based Cedar Mill processor. It has product code 80557, which is shared with Allendale and Conroe-L that are very similar but have a smaller L2 cache. Conroe-L has only one processor core and a new CPUID model. The mobile version of Conroe is Merom, the dual-socket server version is Woodcrest, the quad-core desktop version is Kentsfield and the quad-core dual-socket version is Clovertown. Conroe was replaced by the 45 nm Wolfdale processor.

== Variants ==
Processor	Brand name	Models	Cores	L2 Cache	Socket	TDP
Allendale	Xeon	3xxx	2	2 MB	LGA 775	65 W
Conroe	Xeon	3xxx	2	2−4 MB	LGA 775	65 W
Allendale	Core 2 Duo	E4xxx	2	2 MB	LGA 775	65 W
Conroe	Core 2 Duo	E6xx0	2	2−4 MB	LGA 775	65 W
Conroe-CL	Core 2 Duo	E6xx5	2	2−4 MB	LGA 771	65 W
Conroe-XE	Core 2 Extreme	X6xxx	2	4 MB	LGA 775	75 W
Allendale-1M	Pentium Dual-Core	E2xxx	2	1 MB	LGA 775	65 W
Allendale-512	Celeron	E1xxx	2	0,5 MB	LGA 775	65 W
Conroe-L	Celeron	4x0	1	0,5 MB	LGA 775	35 W
Conroe-CL	Celeron	4x5	1	0,5 MB	LGA 771	65 W

=== Conroe ===
The first Intel Core 2 Duo branded processor cores, code-named Conroe, were launched on July 27, 2006, at Fragapalooza, a yearly gaming event in Edmonton, Alberta, Canada. These processors were fabricated on 300 mm wafers using a 65 nm manufacturing process, and intended for desktop computers as a replacement for the Pentium 4 and Pentium D branded CPUs. Intel claimed that Conroe provided 40% more performance at 40% less power compared to the Pentium D; the E6300, lowest end of the initial Conroe lineup, is able to match or even exceed the former flagship Pentium Extreme Edition 965 in performance, despite a 50% clock frequency deficit. All Conroe processors are manufactured with 4 MB L2 cache; however, due to manufacturing defects or possibly for marketing purposes, the E6300 and E6400 versions based on this core have half their cache disabled, leaving them with only 2 MB of usable L2 cache. These Conroe-based E6300 and E6400 CPUs have the B2 stepping.

The lower end E6300 (1.86 GHz) and E6400 (2.13 GHz) were released on July 27, 2006. Traditionally, CPUs of the same family with less cache simply have the unavailable cache disabled, since this allows parts that fail quality control to be sold at a lower rating. When yields improve, they may be replaced with versions that only have the cache amount needed on the die, to bring down manufacturing cost. At launch time, Intel's prices for the Core 2 Duo E6300 and E6400 processors were US$183 and US$224 each in quantities of 1000.

Conroe CPUs have improved capabilities over previous models with similar processor clock rates. According to reviews, the larger 4 MB L2 cache vs. the 2 MB L2 cache at the same frequency and bus speed can give a 0–9% performance gain with certain applications and 0–16% performance gain with certain games. The higher end Conroe processors are the E6600 (2.4 GHz) and E6700 (2.67 GHz) Core 2 Duo models. The family has a 1066 MHz front-side bus, 4 MB shared L2 cache, and 65 watts TDP. These processors have been tested against AMD's then-current top performing processors (Athlon 64 FX Series), which were, until this Intel release, the highest performance X86 CPUs available. Conroe chips also produce less heat than their predecessors – a benefit of the new 65 nm technology and the more efficient microarchitecture. At launch time, Intel's prices for the Core 2 Duo E6600 and E6700 processors were US$316 and US$530 each in quantities of 1000.

E6320 and E6420 Conroe CPUs at 1.86 and 2.13 GHz respectively were launched on April 22, 2007 featuring a full 4 MB of cache.

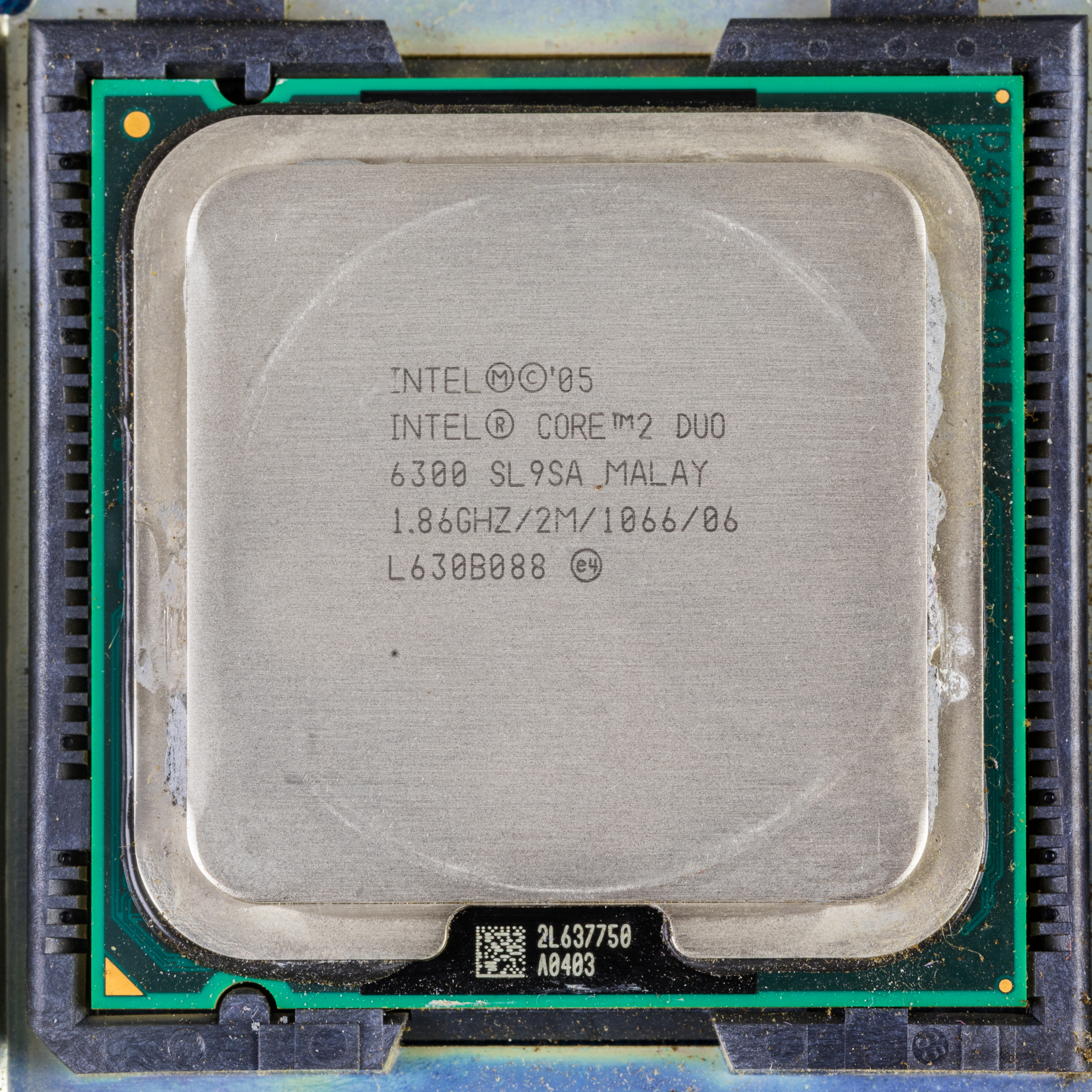
Intel Core 2 Duo E6300 processor

To coincide with the release of the Intel Bearlake (x3x) chipsets, Intel released four more processors on July 22, 2007: the Core 2 Duo E6540, E6550, E6750, and E6850. The number ending in "50" indicates a 1333 MHz FSB. The processors all have 4 MB of L2 cache, and their clock frequency is similar to that of the already released processors with the same first two digits (E6600, E6700, X6800). An additional model, the E6540, was launched with specifications similar to the E6550 but lacking Intel Trusted Execution Technology and vPro support. These processors were marketed to compete with AMD's Phenom processor line and were therefore priced below the corresponding processors with a 1066 MHz FSB.

All remaining Conroe Core 2 processors were phased out in March 2009.

==== Conroe XE ====
The Core 2 Extreme X6800 was officially released on July 29, 2006. It uses the Conroe XE core and replaced the dual-core Pentium Extreme Edition processors. The Core 2 Extreme X6800 has a clock rate of 2.93 GHz and a 1066 MT/s FSB, although it was initially expected to be released with a 3.33 GHz clock rate and a 1333 MT/s FSB. The TDP for the X6800 is 75 watts, higher than the 65 watts of regular Core 2 Duo CPUs. With SpeedStep enabled, the average temperature of the CPU when idle is essentially that of the ambient atmosphere with its fan running at 1500 RPM. The less powerful E6x00 models of Core 2 Duo were scheduled for simultaneous release with the X6800.

At launch time, Intel's price for the Core 2 Extreme X6800 was US$999 each in quantities of 1000. Like the desktop Core 2 Duo, it has 4 MB of shared L2 cache available. This means that the only major difference between the regular Core 2 Duo and Core 2 Extreme is the higher clock rate and unlocked multiplier, the usual advantages of the "Extreme Edition". The fully unlocked multiplier is of use to enthusiasts as it allows the user to set the clock rate higher than shipping frequency without modifying the FSB frequency, unlike mainstream Core 2 Duo models whose multipliers are downward unlocked only.

=== Allendale ===
Allendale was originally the name for the E4000 processors, which use a low-cost version of the Conroe core. They feature a lower front side bus frequency of 800 MT/s instead of 1066 MT/s and only half the L2 cache (2 MB, similar to the Core 2 Duo E6300 and E6400), offering a smaller die size and therefore greater yields. Most media have subsequently applied the name Allendale to all LGA 775 processors with steppings L2 and M0, while Intel refers to all of these as Conroe.

The Core 2 Duo E4300 uses an Allendale core, released on January 21, 2007. Allendale processors are produced in the LGA 775 form factor, on the 65 nm process node. Initial list price per processor in quantities of one thousand for the E4300 was US$163. A standard OEM price was US$175, or US$189 for a retail package. The price was cut on April 22, 2007, when the E4400 was released at $133 and the E4300 dropped to $113. A new E2000 series of Allendale processors with half their L2 cache disabled was released in mid-June 2007 under the Pentium Dual-Core brand name. The working cache memory was reduced by half again when the Allendale core was released under Intel's Celeron brand; the Celeron E1000 processors have a 512k L2 cache shared between its two cores.

Subsequent E4000 Allendale processors were introduced as E4500 and E4600. The final E4700 processor was using the G0 stepping instead of M0, which makes it a Conroe core. The E4000 processors were discontinued on March 6, 2009.

E6300 and E6400 CPUs, as well as their Xeon 3040 and 3050 counterparts, have been made using the original 4 MB B2 stepping with half their L2 cache disabled prior to Q1 2007, but using the 2 MB L2 stepping later. This caused contention regarding whether or not the previously available versions were specimens of the Allendale core. Only the newer cores are now commonly referred to as Allendale.

Quoted from The Tech Report:

You'll find plenty of sources that will tell you the code name for these 2 MB Core 2 Duo processors is "Allendale," but Intel says otherwise. These CPUs are still code-named "Conroe," which makes sense since they're the same physical chips with half of their L2 cache disabled. Intel may well be cooking up a chip code-named Allendale with 2 MB of L2 cache natively, but this is not that chip.

=== Conroe-L ===
The Conroe-L Celeron is a single-core processor built on the Core microarchitecture and is clocked much lower than the Cedar Mill Celerons, but still outperforms them. It is based on the 65 nm Conroe-L core, and uses a 400-series model number sequence. The FSB was increased from 533 MHz to 800 MHz in this generation, and the TDP was decreased from 65 W to 35 W. Traditionally with Celerons, it does not have Intel VT-x support or SpeedStep. All Conroe-L models are single-core processors for the value segment of the market, much like the AMD K8-based Sempron. The product line was launched on June 5, 2007.

On October 21, 2007, Intel presented a new processor for the Intel Essential Series, the Celeron 220. The Celeron 220 and is soldered on the D201GLY2 motherboard. With 1.2 GHz and a 512 KB L2 cache, it has a TDP of 19 watts, and can be cooled passively. The Celeron 220 is the successor of the Celeron 215 which is based on a Yonah core and used on the D201GLY motherboard. This processor is exclusively used on the mini-ITX boards targeted to the sub-value market segment.

=== Conroe-CL ===
Conroe-CL is a version of Conroe with the LGA 771 socket otherwise used in Woodcrest. Unlike real Woodcrest, they are only usable in single-CPU configurations. The three Conroe-CL processors that are known are sold as Core 2 Duo E6305, E6405 and Celeron 445. These processors will not work in regular LGA 775 mainboards but are typically used in blade servers that also use Woodcrest or other DP server processors.

== See also ==
- Pentium D
- Merom (microprocessor)
- Wolfdale (microprocessor)
- Celeron
- Pentium Dual-Core
- Intel Core 2
