= LGA 771 =

Intel server CPU socket

Socket J (LGA 771)
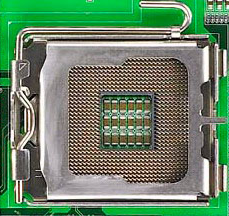
- Release date: May 16, 2006; 20 years ago
- Designed by: Intel
- Manufactured by: Intel
- Type: Land Grid Array (LGA)
- Chip form factors: Flip chip land grid array
- Contacts: 771
- FSB protocol: AGTL+
- FSB frequency: 667 MT/s, 1066 MT/s, 1333 MT/s, 1600 MT/s
- Voltage range: Varies (1.3625V max)
- Processor dimensions: 37.5 × 37.5 mm
- Processors: Intel Celeron 445 (1.87 GHz); Intel Core 2 Duo E6x05 (1.87 - 2.13 GHz); Intel Dual-Core Xeon E/X/L 50xx–52xx (1.60 - 3.73 GHz); Intel Quad-Core Xeon X 33xx (2.50 - 2.83 GHz); Intel Quad-Core Xeon E/X/L 53xx–54xx (1.60 - 3.40 GHz); Intel Core 2 Extreme QX9775 (3.20 GHz)
- Predecessor: Socket 604
- Variant: LGA 775 (Socket T)
- Successor: LGA 1366
- Memory support: DDR2, DDR3
- This article is part of the CPU socket series

LGA 771, also known as Socket J, is a CPU interface introduced by Intel in 2006. It is used in Intel Core microarchitecture and NetBurst microarchitecture (Dempsey) based DP-capable server processors, the Dual-Core Xeon is codenamed Dempsey, Woodcrest, and Wolfdale and the Quad-Core processors Clovertown, Harpertown, and Yorkfield-CL. It is also used for the Core 2 Extreme QX9775, and blade servers designated under Conroe-CL.

It was succeeded by LGA 1366 for the Nehalem-based Xeon processors.

== Technical specifications ==
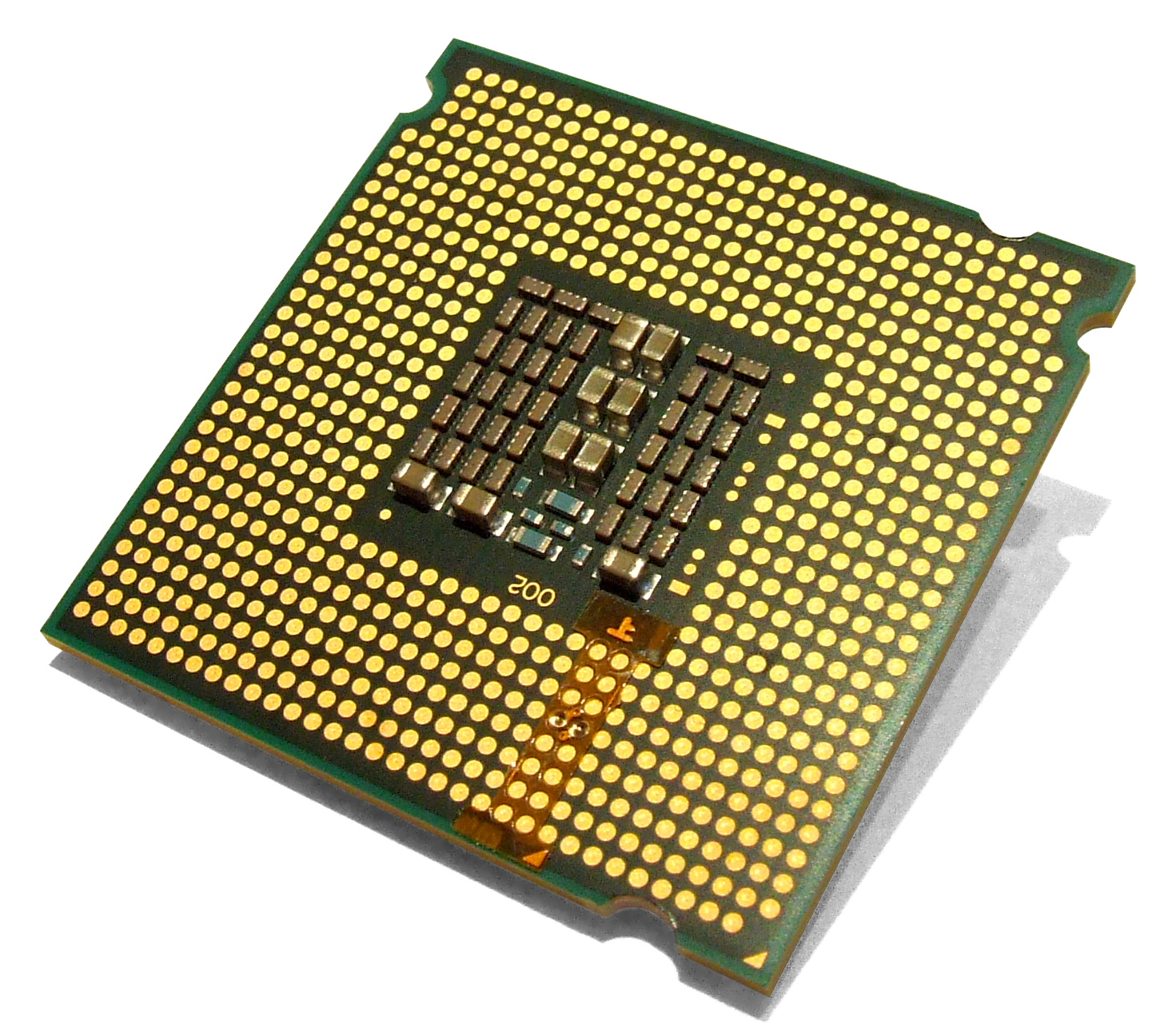
A Xeon E5450 modified to fit in LGA 775 motherboards.

As its name implies, it is a land grid array with 771 contacts. The socket has 771 protruding spring-loaded pins which touch the lands on the underside of the microprocessor.

The "J" in "Socket J" refers to the now-canceled processor codenamed "Jayhawk", which was expected to debut alongside this interface. It is intended as a successor to Socket 604 and takes much of its design from LGA 775 and is almost pin compatible with LGA 775.

Compared to LGA 775 CPUs, LGA 771 CPUs are rotated 90 degrees and have two pins swapped. Small adapters developed by Chinese computer DIY enthusiasts are available to allow LGA 771 CPUs to be installed in LGA 775 motherboards, if the BIOS microcode supports them (but it is also possible to add supporting microcode manually). This also allows for overclocking of Xeon (LGA 771) processors when used in the correct (LGA 775) motherboards. Some overclockers have managed quite substantial overclocks such as 4.023GHz on a Xeon X5492 for a total overclock of just over 18%.

== Single core processors ==
Name	Cores	Frequency	L2 Cache	TDP	FSB	Release date	Price
Xeon 3000 series
Xeon L3014	1	2.40 GHz	3 MB	30W	1066	Q1 2008	OEM
Celeron 400 series
Celeron 445	1	1.87 GHz	512 KB	65W	1066		OEM

== Dual core processors ==
- Hyper-threading supported only on 50xx series processors(codenamed Dempsey)

Name	Cores	Frequency	L2 Cache	TDP	FSB	Release date	Price
Xeon 5000 series
Xeon 5030	2	2.66 GHz	2*2 MB	95W	667		
Xeon 5040	2	2.83 GHz	2*2 MB	95W	667		
Xeon 5050	2	3.00 GHz	2*2 MB	95W	667		
Xeon 5060	2	3.20 GHz	2*2 MB	130W	1066		
Xeon 5063	2	3.20 GHz	2*2 MB	95W	1066		
Xeon 5070	2	3.46 GHz	2*2 MB	130W	1066		
Xeon 5080	2	3.73 GHz	2*2 MB	130W	1066		
Xeon 3100 series
Xeon E3113	2	3.00 GHz	6 MB	65W	1333	Q3 2008	OEM
Xeon 5100 series
Xeon 5110	2	1.60 GHz	4 MB	65W	1066		
Xeon 5120	2	1.86 GHz	4 MB	65W	1066		
Xeon 5130	2	2.00 GHz	4 MB	65W	1333	Q2 2006	
Xeon 5140	2	2.33 GHz	4 MB	65W	1333	Q2 2006	
Xeon LV 5148	2	2.33 GHz	4 MB	40W	1333	Q2 2006	
Xeon 5150	2	2.66 GHz	4 MB	65W	1333	Q2 2006	
Xeon 5160	2	3.00 GHz	4 MB	80W	1333		
Xeon 5200 series
Xeon E5205	2	1.86 GHz	6 MB	65W	1066		
Xeon E5220	2	2.33 GHz	6 MB	65W	1333		
Xeon L5215	2	1.86 GHz	6 MB	20W	1066		
Xeon L5240	2	3.00 GHz	6 MB	40W	1333		
Xeon X5260	2	3.33 GHz	6 MB	80W	1333	Q4 2007	
Xeon X5270	2	3.50 GHz	6 MB	80W	1333	Q3 2008	
Xeon X5272	2	3.40 GHz	6 MB	80W	1600	Q4 2007	

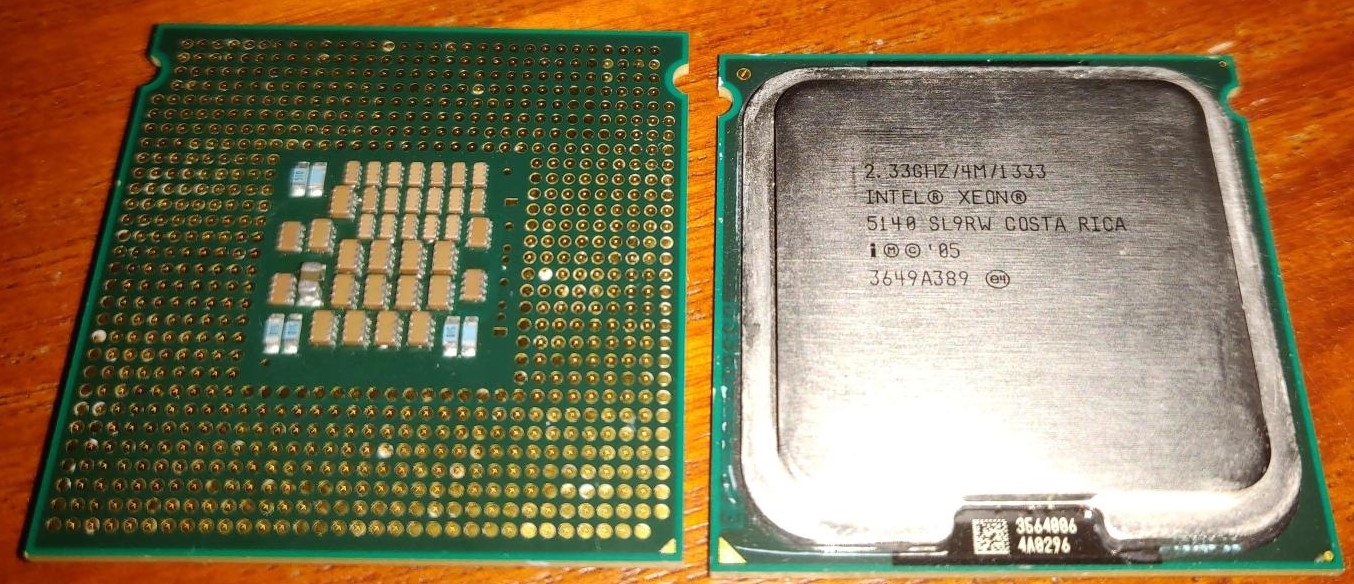
Intel Xeon 5140 processor. Compatible with LGA 771 motherboards. It has two cores at 2.33 GHz, 4 MB of L2 cache, an FSB speed of 1333 MT/s and a TDP of 65 W.

== Quad core processors ==
Name	Cores	Frequency	L2 Cache	TDP	FSB	Release date	Price
Xeon 3300 Series
Xeon X3323	4	2.50 GHz	6 MB	80W	1333	Q1 2008	OEM
Xeon X3353	4	2.67 GHz	12 MB	80W	1333	Q1 2008	OEM
Xeon X3363	4	2.83 GHz	12 MB	80W	1333	Q1 2008	OEM
Xeon 5300 series
Xeon E5310	4	1.60 GHz	8 MB	80W	1066	Q4 2006	
Xeon E5320	4	1.86 GHz	8 MB	80W	1066	Q4 2006	
Xeon E5335	4	2.00 GHz	8 MB	80W	1333	Q1 2007	
Xeon E5345	4	2.33 GHz	8 MB	80W	1333	Q1 2007	
Xeon L5310	4	1.60 GHz	8 MB	50W	1066	Q1 2007	
Xeon L5318	4	1.60 GHz	8 MB	40W	1066	Q1 2007	
Xeon L5320	4	1.86 GHz	8 MB	50W	1066	Q1 2007	
Xeon L5335	4	2.00 GHz	8 MB	50W	1333	Q3 2007	
Xeon X5355	4	2.66 GHz	8 MB	120W	1333	Q4 2006	
Xeon X5365	4	3.00 GHz	8 MB	150W	1333	Q3 2007	
Xeon 5400 series
Xeon E5405	4	2.00 GHz	12 MB	80W	1333	Q4 2007	
Xeon E5410	4	2.33 GHz	12 MB	80W	1333	Q4 2007	
Xeon E5420	4	2.50 GHz	12 MB	80W	1333	Q4 2007	
Xeon E5430	4	2.66 GHz	12 MB	80W	1333	Q4 2007	
Xeon E5440	4	2.83 GHz	12 MB	80W	1333	Q1 2008	
Xeon E5450	4	3.00 GHz	12 MB	80W	1333	Q4 2007	
Xeon E5462	4	2.80 GHz	12 MB	80W	1600	Q4 2007	
Xeon E5472	4	3.00 GHz	12 MB	80W	1600	Q4 2007	
Xeon L5408	4	2.13 GHz	12 MB	40W	1066	Q1 2008	
Xeon L5410	4	2.33 GHz	12 MB	50W	1333	Q1 2008	
Xeon L5420	4	2.50 GHz	12 MB	50W	1333	Q1 2008	
Xeon L5430	4	2.66 GHz	12 MB	50W	1333	Q3 2008	
Xeon X5450	4	3.00 GHz	12 MB	120W	1333	Q4 2007	
Xeon X5460	4	3.16 GHz	12 MB	120W	1333	Q4 2007	
Xeon X5470	4	3.33 GHz	12 MB	120W	1333	Q3 2008	
Xeon X5472	4	3.00 GHz	12 MB	120W	1600	Q4 2007	
Xeon X5482	4	3.20 GHz	12 MB	150W	1600	Q4 2007	
Xeon X5492	4	3.40 GHz	12 MB	150W	1600	Q3 2008	
Core 2 Extreme QX9000 series
QX9775	4	3.20 GHz	12 MB	150W	1600	Q1 2008	

== See also ==
- List of Intel microprocessors
- List of Intel Xeon microprocessors
