= LGA 115x =

LGA 115x may refer to:

- LGA 1156 (Socket H)
- LGA 1155 (Socket H2)
- LGA 1150 (Socket H3)
- LGA 1151 (Socket H4)
