= 67P (disambiguation) =

67P/Churyumov–Gerasimenko is a Jupiter-family comet

67P may also refer to:

- Progress 67P, a progress spaceflight to resupply the International Space Station
- Pratt & Whitney Canada PT6A-67P, an engine in the Pratt & Whitney Canada PT6 family

== See also ==
- P67 (disambiguation)
