= Intel P67 =

- Codename(s): Cougar Point
- CPU supported: Intel Core (Sandy Bridge)
- Socket supported: LGA 1155

Miscellaneous
- Release date(s): January 2011
- Predecessor: Intel P55

The Intel P67 is a mainstream chipset created by Intel. It was launched to market in January 2011, the first edition of this chipset had a faulty SATA 3.0 controller and Intel had to issue a hardware fix to resolve this problem. This fix (Revision B3) was launched to market at the beginning of March 2011.

== Features ==
Standard features:

- Supports processor overclocking (Only available for unlocked processors: Core i5-2500K, Core i5-2550K, Core i7-2600K and 2700K)
- Supports memory overclocking
- 1× PCI Express 2.0 x16 lanes at 16 GB/s bandwidth
- 2× Serial ATA (SATA) 3.0 (6 Gbit/s) ports
- 4× Serial ATA (SATA) 2.0(3 Gbit/s) ports
- 14× Universal Serial Bus (USB) 2.0 ports
- Dual-channel DDR3 memory
- Integrated Gigabit Ethernet MAC

Optional features:

- SATA RAID support (0/1/10/5) through Intel Rapid Storage Technology
- 2× PCI Express 2.0 x8 lanes at 8 GB/s bandwidth each

The P67 chipset is made to work in conjunction with Intel LGA 1155 CPUs and LGA 1156 CPUs. ASRock produced a motherboard in 2010 using the P67 chipset which supports Lynnfield and Clarkdale.
