= List of Intel Celeron processors =

The latest standard badge design used by Intel to promote the Celeron brand

The Celeron was a family of microprocessors from Intel targeted at the low-end consumer market. CPUs in the Celeron brand have used designs from sixth- to eighth-generation CPU microarchitectures. It was replaced by the Intel Processor brand in 2023.

== Desktop processors ==
=== P6-based Celerons ===
==== Celeron (single-core) ====
===== "Covington" (250 nm) =====
- All models support: MMX
- Steppings: A0, A1, B0

Model	Clock rate	L2 cache	FSB	Mult.	Voltage	TDP	Socket	Release date	Release price (USD)
Celeron 266	267 MHz	—N/a	66 MT/s	4×	2.0 V	16.59 W	Slot 1	April 15, 1998	$155
Celeron 300	300 MHz	—N/a	66 MT/s	4.5×	2.0 V	18.48 W	Slot 1	June 8, 1998	$159

===== "Mendocino" (250 nm) =====
- All models support: MMX
- L2 cache is on-die, running at full CPU speed

Model	Clock rate	L2 cache	FSB	Mult.	Voltage	TDP	Socket	Release date	Release price (USD)
Celeron 300A	300 MHz	128 KB	66 MT/s	4.5×	2.0 V	17.8 W	Slot 1; Socket 370	August 24, 1998	$149
Celeron 333	333 MHz	128 KB	66 MT/s	5×	2.0 V	19.7 W	Slot 1; Socket 370	August 24, 1998	$192
Celeron 366	367 MHz	128 KB	66 MT/s	5.5×	2.0 V	21.7 W	Slot 1; Socket 370	January 4, 1999	$131 $123
Celeron 400	400 MHz	128 KB	66 MT/s	6×	2.0 V	23.7 W	Slot 1; Socket 370	January 4, 1999	$166 $158
Celeron 433	433 MHz	128 KB	66 MT/s	6.5×	2.0 V	24.1 W	Slot 1; Socket 370	March 22, 1999	$177 $169
Celeron 466	467 MHz	128 KB	66 MT/s	7×	2.0 V	25.7 W	Socket 370	April 26, 1999	$169
Celeron 500	500 MHz	128 KB	66 MT/s	7.5×	2.0 V	27 W	Socket 370	August 2, 1999	$167
Celeron 533	533 MHz	128 KB	66 MT/s	8×	2.0 V	28.3 W	Socket 370	January 4, 2000	$167

===== "Coppermine-128" (180 nm) =====
- All models support: MMX, SSE

Model	Clock rate	L2 cache	FSB	Mult.	Voltage	TDP	Socket	Release date	Release price (USD)
Celeron 533A	533 MHz	128 KB	66 MT/s	8×	1.5/1.7 V	14 W	Socket 370	March 29, 2000	
Celeron 566	567 MHz	128 KB	66 MT/s	8.5×	1.5/1.7/1.75 V	19.2 W	Socket 370	March 29, 2000	$167
Celeron 600	600 MHz	128 KB	66 MT/s	9×	1.5/1.7/1.75 V	15.8 W	Socket 370	March 29, 2000	$181
Celeron 633	633 MHz	128 KB	66 MT/s	9.5×	1.5/1.7/1.75 V	16.5 W	Socket 370	June 26, 2000	$138
Celeron 667	667 MHz	128 KB	66 MT/s	10×	1.5/1.7/1.75 V	17.5 W	Socket 370	June 26, 2000	$170
Celeron 700	700 MHz	128 KB	66 MT/s	10.5×	1.65/1.7/1.75 V	18.3 W	Socket 370	June 26, 2000	$192
Celeron 733	733 MHz	128 KB	66 MT/s	11×	1.65/1.7/1.75 V	23.6 W	Socket 370	November 13, 2000	$112
Celeron 766	767 MHz	128 KB	66 MT/s	11.5×	1.65/1.7/1.75 V	20 W	Socket 370	November 13, 2000	$170
Celeron 800	800 MHz	128 KB	100 MT/s	8×	1.65/1.7/1.75 V	20.8 W	Socket 370	January 3, 2001	$170
Celeron 850	850 MHz	128 KB	100 MT/s	8.5×	1.7/1.75 V	25.7 W	Socket 370	April 9, 2001	$138
Celeron 900	900 MHz	128 KB	100 MT/s	9×	1.75 V	26.7 W	Socket 370	July 2, 2001	$103
Celeron 950	950 MHz	128 KB	100 MT/s	9.5×	1.75 V	28 W	Socket 370	August 31, 2001	$74
Celeron 1.00	1000 MHz	128 KB	100 MT/s	10×	1.75 V	29 W	Socket 370	August 31, 2001	$89
Celeron 1.10	1100 MHz	128 KB	100 MT/s	11×	1.75 V	33 W	Socket 370	August 31, 2001	$103

===== "Tualatin-256" (130 nm) =====
- All models support: MMX, SSE
- Family 6 model 11

Model	Clock rate	L2 cache	FSB	Mult.	Voltage	TDP	Socket	Release date	Release price (USD)
Celeron 900A	900 MHz	256 KB	100 MT/s	9×	1.475 V		Socket 370		
Celeron 1000A	1000 MHz	256 KB	100 MT/s	10×	1.475 V	27.8/29.5 W	Socket 370	January 2002	$69
Celeron 1100A	1100 MHz	256 KB	100 MT/s	11×	1.5 V	27.8/29.5 W	Socket 370	January 2002	$79
Celeron 1200	1200 MHz	256 KB	100 MT/s	12×	1.5 V	29.9/32.9 W	Socket 370	October 2, 2001	$103
Celeron 1300	1300 MHz	256 KB	100 MT/s	13×	1.5 V	32/33.4 W	Socket 370	January 3, 2002	$118
Celeron 1400	1400 MHz	256 KB	100 MT/s	14×	1.5 V	33.2/34.8 W	Socket 370	May 15, 2002	$89
Celeron 1500	1500 MHz	256 KB	100 MT/s	15×	1.5 V		Socket 370		

=== NetBurst-based Celerons ===
==== Celeron (single-core) ====
===== "Willamette-128" (180 nm) =====
- Family 15 model 1
- All models support: MMX, SSE, SSE2
- Steppings: E0

Model number	sSpec number	Freq. (GHz)	L2 Cache (KB)	FSB (MHz)	Mult	Voltage (V)	TDP (W)	Socket	Release date	Part number(s)	Release price (USD)
Celeron 1.5	SL69W	1.5	128	400	15×	1.75	?	Socket 478	2002	RK80531RC021128	
Celeron 1.6	SL69Y	1.6	128	400	16×	1.75	?	Socket 478	2002	RK80531RC025128	
Celeron 1.7	SL68C, SL69Z	1.7	128	400	17×	1.75	63.5	Socket 478	May 15, 2002	BX80531P170G128; RK80531RC029128	$83
Celeron 1.8	SL68D, SL6A2	1.8	128	400	18×	1.75	66.1	Socket 478	June 12, 2002	BX80531P180G128; RK80531RC033128	$103
Celeron 1.9	SL68E, SL6A3	1.9	128	400	19×	1.75	?	Socket 478	June 12, 2002	RK80531RC037128	
Celeron 2.0	SL68F	2.0	128	400	20×	1.75	71.2	Socket 478	June 12, 2002	RK80531RC041128	

===== "Northwood-128" (130 nm) =====
- Family 15 model 2
- All models support: MMX, SSE, SSE2
- Steppings: C0, C1, D0, D1, D4, DD

Model number	sSpec number	Freq. (GHz)	L2 Cache (KB)	FSB (MHz)	Mult	Voltage (V)	TDP (W)	Socket	Release date	Part number(s)	Release price (USD)
Celeron 1.6	SL7EZ	1.6	128	400	16×	1.475/ 1.525		Socket 478		RK80532RC025128	
Celeron 1.8A	SL7RU	1.8	128	400	18×	1.560- 1.725	66.1	Socket 478	April 2003	BX80532RC1800B; RK80532RC033128	
Celeron 2.0	SL6HY, SL6LC, SL6RV, SL6SW, SL6VY, SL6VR	2.0	128	400	20×	1.315- 1.525	52.8	Socket 478	September 18, 2002	BX80532RC2000B; RK80532RC041128	$103
Celeron 2.1	SL6RS, SL6SY, SL6VS, SL6VZ	2.1	128	400	21×	1.315- 1.525	55.5	Socket 478	November 20, 2002	BX80532RC2100B; RK80532RC045128	$89
Celeron 2.2	SL6SX, SL6RW, SL6VT, SL6W2	2.2	128	400	22×	1.315- 1.525	57.1	Socket 478	November 20, 2002	BX80532RC2200B; RK80532RC049128	$103
Celeron 2.3	SL6T2, SL6T3, SL6T5, SL6WC, SL6WD, SL6XJ	2.3	128	400	23×	1.315- 1.525	58.3	Socket 478	March 31, 2003	BX80532RC2300B; RK80532RC052128	$117
Celeron 2.4	SL6V2, SL6VU, SL6W4, SL6XG	2.4	128	400	24×	1.315- 1.525	59.8	Socket 478	March 31, 2003	BX80532RC2400B; RK80532RC056128	$127
Celeron 2.5	SL6ZY, SL72B	2.5	128	400	25×	1.315- 1.525	61	Socket 478	June 25, 2003	BX80532RC2500B; BX80532RC2500D; RK80532RC060128	$89
Celeron 2.6	SL6VV, SL6W5	2.6	128	400	26×	1.315- 1.525	62.6	Socket 478	June 25, 2003	BX80532RC2600B; BX80532RC2600D; RK80532RC064128	$103
Celeron 2.7	SL77S, SL77U	2.7	128	400	27×	1.315- 1.525	66.8	Socket 478	September 24, 2003	BX80532RC2700B; BX80532RC2700D; RK80532RC068128	$103
Celeron 2.8	SL77T, SL77V	2.8	128	400	28×	1.315- 1.525	68.4	Socket 478	November 5, 2003	BX80532RC2800B; RK80532RC072128	$117

==== Celeron D (single core) ====
===== "Prescott-256" (90 nm) =====
- All models support: MMX, SSE, SSE2, SSE3
- Intel 64: supported by 3x1, 3x6 and 355
- XD bit (an NX bit implementation): supported by all Intel 64-compatible models as well as 3x0J and 3x5J
- Steppings: C0, D0, E0, G0 & G1

Model number	sSpec number	Freq. (GHz)	L2 Cache (KB)	FSB (MHz)	Mult	Voltage (V)	TDP (W)	Socket	Release date	Part number(s)	Release price (USD)
Celeron D 310	SL8S2, SL8RZ, SL93R, SL8S4	2.133	256	533	16×	1.250 -1.400	73	Socket 478	Dec 2005	RK80546RE046256; B80546RE046256; NE80546RE046256	
Celeron D 315	SL7XY, SL7XG, SL7WS, SL87K, SL93Q, SL8HH, SL8AW	2.266	256	533	17×	1.250 -1.400	73	Socket 478	Dec 2005	RK80546RE051256; B80546RE051256; NE80546RE051256	
Celeron D 320	SL7KX, SL7JV, SL7C4, SL8HJ, SL87J, SL7VW	2.4	256	533	18×	1.250 -1.400	73	Socket 478	Jun 24 2004	RK80546RE056256	$69
Celeron D 320	SL7VQ	2.4	256	533	18×	1.250 -1.400	73	LGA 775	Jun 24 2004	BX80547RE2400C	$69
Celeron D 325	SL7ND, SL7NU, SL7C5, SL7KY, SL7VX, SL8HK, SL7TG	2.533	256	533	19×	1.250 -1.400	65, 73	Socket 478	Jun 24 2004	RK80546RE061256	$79
Celeron D 325	SL7TU	2.533	256	533	19×	1.250 -1.400	84	LGA 775	Jun 24 2004	BX80547RE2533C	$79
Celeron D 325J	SL7TL, SL7VR, SL7SS	2.533	256	533	19×	1.250 -1.400	65, 84	LGA 775	Sep 22 2004	JM80547RE061256	$79
Celeron D 326	SL7TU, SL8H5, SL98U	2.533	256	533	19×	1.250 -1.400	84	LGA 775	Jun 27 2005	JM80547RE061CN	$73
Celeron D 330	SL7KZ, SL7NV, SL7C6, SL7DL, SL7VY, SL8HL, SL7TH	2.667	256	533	20×	1.250 -1.400	73	Socket 478	Jun 24 2004	RK80546RE067256	$89
Celeron D 330	SL8HL	2.667	256	533	20×	1.250 -1.400	73	LGA 775	Jun 24 2004	BX80547RE2667C	$89
Celeron D 330J	SL7TM, SL7VS, SL7TV, SL7ST, Instruction Set 32-bit	2.667	256	533	20×	1.250 -1.400	84	LGA 775	Sep 22 2004	JM80547RE067256	$89
Celeron D 331	SL7TV, SL8H7, SL98V, Instruction Set 64-bit	2.667	256	533	20×	1.250 -1.400	84	LGA 775	Jun 27 2005	JM80547RE067CN	$79
Celeron D 335	SL8HM, SL7NW, SL7VZ, SL7TJ, SL7DM, SL7L2, SL7C7	2.8	256	533	21×	1.250 -1.400	73	Socket 478	Jun 24 2004	RK80546RE072256	$117
Celeron D 335	SL7TW	2.8	256	533	21×	1.250 -1.400	84	LGA 775	Jun 24 2004	BX80547RE2800C	$117
Celeron D 335J	SL7TN, SL7VT, SL7SU	2.8	256	533	21×	1.250 -1.400	84	LGA 775	Sep 22 2004	JM80547RE072256	$117
Celeron D 336	SL7TW, SL8H9, SL98W	2.8	256	533	21×	1.250 -1.400	84	LGA 775	Jun 27 2005	JM80547RE072CN	$89
Celeron D 340	SL7RN, SL7Q9, SL8HN, SL7W2, SL7TS	2.933	256	533	22×	1.250 -1.400	73	Socket 478	Sep 22 2004	RK80546RE077256	$117
Celeron D 340J	SL7TP, SL7RN	2.933	256	533	22×	1.250 -1.400	84	LGA 775	Sep 22 2004	BX80547RE2933C	$117
Celeron D 340J	SL7TP, SL7SV, SL7QA	2.933	256	533	22×	1.250 -1.400	84	LGA 775	Sep 22 2004	JM80547RE077256	$117
Celeron D 341	SL7TX, SL8HB, SL98X	2.933	256	533	22×	1.250 -1.400	84	LGA 775	Jun 27 2005	JM80547RE077CN	$103
Celeron D 345	SL7NX, SL7DN, SL8HP, SL7W3	3.066	256	533	23×	1.250 -1.400	73	Socket 478	Nov 2004	RK80546RE083256	
Celeron D 345J	SL7TQ, SL7VV, SL7TY	3.066	256	533	23×	1.250 -1.400	84	LGA 775, Socket 478	Oct 2004	JM80547RE083256	
Celeron D 346	SL7TY, SL8HD, SL9BR	3.066	256	533	23×	1.250 -1.400	84	LGA 775	Jun 27 2005	JM80547RE083CN	$117
Celeron D 350	SL8HQ, SL7NY, SL7L4, SL7DN	3.20	256	533	24×	1.250 -1.400	73	Socket 478	Jun 27 2005	NE80546RE088256; RK80546RE088256	$127
Celeron D 350J	SL8MK, SL7TZ	3.20	256	533	24×	1.250 -1.400	73	Socket 478	Jun 27 2005	RH80536NC0131M	$127
Celeron D 351	SL7TZ, SL8HF, SL9BS	3.20	256	533	24×	1.250 -1.400	84	LGA 775	Jun 27 2005	JM80547RE088CN	$127
Celeron D 355	SL8HS, SL9BT	3.333	256	533	25×	1.250 -1.400	84	LGA 775	Dec 2005	HH80547RE093CN	$127

===== "Cedar Mill-512" (65 nm) =====
- All models support: MMX, SSE, SSE2, SSE3, Intel 64, XD bit (an NX bit implementation)
- Steppings: C1, D0

Model number	sSpec number	Freq. (GHz)	L2 Cache (KB)	FSB (MHz)	Mult	Voltage (V)	TDP (W)	Socket	Release date	Part number(s)	Release price (USD)
Celeron D 347	SL9XU (C1); SL9KN (D0)	3.066	512	533	23×	1.25 –1.325	86; 65	LGA 775	Oct 22 2006	HH80552RE083512	$49
Celeron D 352	SL96P (C1); SL9KM (D0)	3.20	512	533	24×	1.25 –1.325	86; 65	LGA 775	May 28 2006	HH80552RE088512	$79
Celeron D 356	SL96N (C1); SL9KL (D0)	3.333	512	533	25×	1.25 –1.325	86; 65	LGA 775	May 28 2006	HH80552RE093512	$89
Celeron D 360	SL9KK (D0)	3.466	512	533	26×	1.25 –1.325	65	LGA 775	Nov 26 2006	HH80552RE099512	$84
Celeron D 365	SL9KJ (D0)	3.60	512	533	27×	1.25 –1.325	65	LGA 775	Jan 2007	HH80552RE104512	$69

=== Core-based Celerons ===
==== Celeron (single-core) ====
===== "Conroe-L" (65 nm) =====
- All models support: MMX, SSE, SSE2, SSE3, SSSE3, Intel 64, XD bit (an NX bit implementation)
- Steppings: A1

Model	sSpec number	Cores	Clock rate	L2 cache	FSB	Mult.	Voltage	TDP	Socket	Release date	Part number(s)	Release price (USD)
Celeron 220	SLAF2 (A1)	1	1.2 GHz	512 KB	533 MT/s	9×	1.05–1.3 V	19 W	μFC-BGA	October 2007	LE80557RE014512	$58
Celeron 420	SL9XP (A1)	1	1.6 GHz	512 KB	800 MT/s	8×	1.05–1.3 V	35 W	LGA 775	June 2007	HH80557RG025512	$39
Celeron 430	SL9XN (A1)	1	1.8 GHz	512 KB	800 MT/s	9×	1.05–1.3 V	35 W	LGA 775	June 2007	HH80557RG033512	$49
Celeron 440	SL9XL (A1)	1	2 GHz	512 KB	800 MT/s	10×	1.05–1.3 V	35 W	LGA 775	June 2007	HH80557RG041512	$59
Celeron 450	SLAFZ (A1)	1	2.2 GHz	512 KB	800 MT/s	11×	1.05–1.3 V	35 W	LGA 775	August 2008	HH80557RG049512	$53

===== "Conroe-CL" (65 nm) =====
- All models support: MMX, SSE, SSE2, SSE3, SSSE3, Intel 64, XD bit (an NX bit implementation), Intel VT-x
- Steppings: ?

Model	sSpec number	Cores	Clock rate	L2 cache	FSB	Mult.	Voltage	TDP	Socket	Release date	Part number(s)	Release price (USD)
Celeron 445	SLAGH	1	1.87 GHz	512 KB	1066 MT/s	7×		65 W	LGA 771		HH80556KH036512S; HH80556KH036D	

==== Celeron (dual-core) ====
===== "Allendale" (65 nm) =====
- All models support: MMX, SSE, SSE2, SSE3, SSSE3, Enhanced Intel SpeedStep Technology (EIST), Intel 64, XD bit (an NX bit implementation)
- Steppings: M0

Model	sSpec number	Cores	Clock rate	L2 cache	FSB	Mult.	Voltage	TDP	Socket	Release date	Part number(s)	Release price (USD)
Celeron E1200	SLAQW (M0)	2	1.6 GHz	512 KB	800 MT/s	8×	1.162–1.312 V	65 W	LGA 775	January 2008	HH80557PG025D	$53
Celeron E1400	SLAR2 (M0)	2	2 GHz	512 KB	800 MT/s	10×	1.162–1.312 V	65 W	LGA 775	April 2008	HH80557PG041D	$53
Celeron E1500	SLAQZ (M0)	2	2.2 GHz	512 KB	800 MT/s	11×	0.962–1.275 V	65 W	LGA 775	2008	HH80557PG049D	$53
Celeron E1600	SLAQY (M0)	2	2.4 GHz	512 KB	800 MT/s	12×	0.962–1.275 V	65 W	LGA 775	May 2009	HH80557PG056D	$53

===== "Wolfdale-3M" (45 nm) =====
- Based on Core microarchitecture
- All models support: MMX, SSE, SSE2, SSE3, SSSE3, Enhanced Intel SpeedStep Technology (EIST), Intel 64, XD bit (an NX bit implementation), Intel VT-x
- Steppings: R0
- Die size: 82 mm^{2}

Model	sSpec number	Cores	Clock rate	L2 cache	FSB	Mult.	Voltage	TDP	Socket	Release date	Part number(s)	Release price (USD)
Celeron E3200	SLGU5 (R0)	2	2.4 GHz	1 MB	800 MT/s	12×	0.85–1.3625 V	65 W	LGA 775	August 2009	BX80571E3200; AT80571RG0561ML	$43
Celeron E3300	SLGU4 (R0)	2	2.5 GHz	1 MB	800 MT/s	12.5×	0.85–1.3625 V	65 W	LGA 775	August 2009	BX80571E3300; AT80571RG0601ML	$43
Celeron E3400	SLGTZ (R0)	2	2.6 GHz	1 MB	800 MT/s	13×	0.85–1.3625 V	65 W	LGA 775	January 2010	BX80571E3400; AT80571RG0641ML	$53
Celeron E3500	SLGTY (R0)	2	2.7 GHz	1 MB	800 MT/s	13.5×	0.85–1.3625 V	65 W	LGA 775	August 2010	BX80571E3500; AT80571RG0681ML	$52

=== Westmere-based Celerons ===
==== Celeron (dual-core) ====
===== "Clarkdale" (MCP, 32 nm) =====
- Based on Westmere microarchitecture
- All models support: MMX, SSE, SSE2, SSE3, SSSE3, Enhanced Intel SpeedStep Technology (EIST),

Intel 64, XD bit (an NX bit implementation), Intel VT-x, Smart Cache.

- Contains 45 nm "Ironlake" GPU.

Model	sSpec number	Clock rate	Turbo	GPU frequency	Cores	L2 cache	L3 cache	I/O bus	Mult.	Memory	Voltage	TDP	Socket	Release date	Part number(s)	Release price (USD)
Celeron G1101	SLBMT (C2); SLBT7 (K0)	2.27 GHz	—N/a	533 MHz	2	2 × 256 KB	2 MB	DMI	17×	2 × DDR3-1066	0.65–1.4 V	73 W	LGA 1156	January 2010	CM8061600 4596AC	$70

=== Sandy Bridge-based Celerons ===
==== "Sandy Bridge" (32 nm) ====
- All models support: MMX, SSE, SSE2, SSE3, SSSE3, SSE4.1, SSE4.2, Enhanced Intel SpeedStep Technology (EIST), Intel 64, XD bit (an NX bit implementation), Intel VT-x, Smart Cache.
- Celeron G440 does not support Enhanced Intel SpeedStep Technology (EIST), this is a special case as the processor uses the minimum available multiplier (16x). The Celeron G440 also does not support Hyper-threading.
- Celeron G460, G465 and G470 support Hyper-threading.
- HD Graphics (Sandy Bridge) contain 6 EUs like the HD Graphics 2000, but does not support the following technologies: Intel Quick Sync Video, InTru 3D, Clear Video HD, Wireless Display, and it does not support 3D Video.
- Transistors: 624 or 504 million
- Die size: 149 or 131 mm^{2}

Model	sSpec number	Cores	Clock rate	Turbo	L2 cache	L3 cache	GPU model	GPU frequency	TDP	Socket	I/O bus	Release date	Part number(s)	Release price (USD)
standard power
Celeron G530	SR05H (Q0)	2	2.4 GHz	—N/a	2 × 256 KB	2 MB	Intel Graphics Technology (6 EUs)	850–1000 MHz	65 W	LGA 1155	DMI 2.0	September 2011	CM8062301046704; BX80623G530; BXC80623G530	$42
Celeron G540	SR05J (Q0)	2	2.5 GHz	—N/a	2 × 256 KB	2 MB	HD Graphics (6 EUs)	850–1000 MHz	65 W	LGA 1155	DMI 2.0	September 2011	CM8062301046804; BX80623G540; BXC80623G540	$52
Celeron G550	SR061 (Q0)	2	2.6 GHz	—N/a	2 × 256 KB	2 MB	HD Graphics (6 EUs)	850–1000 MHz	65 W	LGA 1155	DMI 2.0	June 2012	CM8062307261218; BX80623G550; BXC80623G550	$52
Celeron G555	SR0RZ (Q0)	2	2.7 GHz	—N/a	2 × 256 KB	2 MB	HD Graphics (6 EUs)	850–1000 MHz	65 W	LGA 1155	DMI 2.0	September 2012	CM8062301263601; BX80623G555; BXC80623G555	$52
low power
Celeron G440	SR0BY (Q0)	1	1.6 GHz	—N/a	1 × 256 KB	1 MB	HD Graphics (6 EUs)	650–1000 MHz	35 W	LGA 1155	DMI 2.0	September 2011	CM8062301088501; BX80623G440; BXC80623G440	$37
Celeron G460	SR0GR (Q0)	1	1.8 GHz	—N/a	1 × 256 KB	1.5 MB	HD Graphics (6 EUs)	650–1000 MHz	35 W	LGA 1155	DMI 2.0	December 2011	CM8062301088702; BX80623G460; BXC80623G460	$37
Celeron G465	SR0S8 (Q0)	1	1.9 GHz	—N/a	1 × 256 KB	1.5 MB	HD Graphics (6 EUs)	650–1000 MHz	35 W	LGA 1155	DMI 2.0	September 2012	CM8062301264500; BX80623G465; BXC80623G465	$37
Celeron G470	SR0S7 (Q0)	1	2 GHz	—N/a	1 × 256 KB	1.5 MB	HD Graphics (6 EUs)	650–1000 MHz	35 W	LGA 1155	DMI 2.0	June 2013	CM8062301264401; BX80623G470	$37
Celeron G530T	SR05K (Q0)	2	2 GHz	—N/a	2 × 256 KB	2 MB	HD Graphics (6 EUs)	650–1000 MHz	35 W	LGA 1155	DMI 2.0	September 2011	CM8062301046904	$47
Celeron G540T	SR05L (Q0)	2	2.1 GHz	—N/a	2 × 256 KB	2 MB	HD Graphics (6 EUs)	650–1000 MHz	35 W	LGA 1155	DMI 2.0	June 2012	CM8062301047004	$42
Celeron G550T	SR05V (Q0)	2	2.2 GHz	—N/a	2 × 256 KB	2 MB	HD Graphics (6 EUs)	650–1000 MHz	35 W	LGA 1155	DMI 2.0	September 2012	CM8062301002309	$42

==== "Ivy Bridge" (22 nm) ====
- All models support: MMX, SSE, SSE2, SSE3, SSSE3, SSE4.1, SSE4.2, Enhanced Intel SpeedStep Technology (EIST), Intel 64, XD bit (an NX bit implementation), Intel VT-x, Smart Cache, ECC Memory.
- HD Graphics (Ivy Bridge) contain 6 EUs as well as HD Graphics 2500, but does not support the following technologies: Intel Quick Sync Video, InTru 3D, Clear Video HD, Wireless Display, Intel Insider.

Model	sSpec number	Cores	Clock rate	Turbo	L2 cache	L3 cache	GPU model	GPU frequency	TDP	Socket	I/O bus	Release date	Part number(s)	Release price (USD)
standard power
Celeron G1610	SR10K (P0)	2	2.6 GHz	—N/a	2 × 256 KB	2 MB	Intel Graphics Technology (6 EUs)	650–1050 MHz	55 W	LGA 1155	DMI 2.0	January 20, 2013	CM8063701444901; BX80637G1610; BXC80637G1610	$42
Celeron G1620	SR10L (P0)	2	2.7 GHz	—N/a	2 × 256 KB	2 MB	HD Graphics (6 EUs)	650–1050 MHz	55 W	LGA 1155	DMI 2.0	January 20, 2013	CM8063701445001; BX80637G1620; BXC80637G1620	$52
Celeron G1630	SR16A (P0)	2	2.8 GHz	—N/a	2 × 256 KB	2 MB	HD Graphics (6 EUs)	650–1050 MHz	55 W	LGA 1155	DMI 2.0	September 1, 2013	CM8063701449000; BX80637G1630	$52
low power
Celeron G1610T	SR10M (P0)	2	2.3 GHz	—N/a	2 × 256 KB	2 MB	HD Graphics (6 EUs)	650–1050 MHz	35 W	LGA 1155	DMI 2.0	January 20, 2013	CM8063701445100	$42
Celeron G1620T	SR169 (P0)	2	2.4 GHz	—N/a	2 × 256 KB	2 MB	HD Graphics (6 EUs)	650–1050 MHz	35 W	LGA 1155	DMI 2.0	September 1, 2013	CM8063701448300	$42

=== Silvermont-based Celerons ===
==== "Bay Trail-D" (22 nm) ====
- All models support: MMX, SSE, SSE2, SSE3, SSSE3, Enhanced Intel SpeedStep Technology (EIST), Intel 64, Intel VT-x.
- GPU and memory controller are integrated onto the processor die
- GPU is based on Ivy Bridge Intel HD Graphics, with 4 execution units, and supports DirectX 11, OpenGL 4.0, OpenGL ES 3.0 and OpenCL 1.1 (on Windows). J1800 and J1900 support Intel Quick Sync Video.
- Package size: 25 mm × 27 mm

Model	sSpec number	Cores	Clock rate	Burst	L2 cache	GPU model	GPU frequency	Memory	TDP	SDP	Socket	Release date	Part number(s)	Release price (USD)
Celeron J1750	SR1LP (B2); SR1H6 (B2)	2	2.41 GHz	—N/a	1 MB	Intel Graphics Technology (4 EUs)	688-750 MHz	2 × DDR3L-1333	10 W	—N/a	FC-BGA 1170	September 2013	FH8065301562600	$72
Celeron J1800	SR1SD (B3); SR1UU (C0); SR3V6 (D1)	2	2.41 GHz	2.58 GHz	1 MB	HD Graphics (4 EUs)	688-792 MHz	2 × DDR3L-1333	10 W	—N/a	FC-BGA 1170	November 2013	FH8065301615103; FH8065301615104; FH8065301615104	$72
Celeron J1850	SR1LN (B2); SR1H5 (B2)	4	2 GHz	—N/a	2 MB	HD Graphics (4 EUs)	688-792 MHz	2 × DDR3L-1333	10 W	—N/a	FC-BGA 1170	September 2013	FH8065301455200	$82
Celeron J1900	SR1SC (B3); SR1UT (C0); SR3V5 (D1)	4	2 GHz	2.41 GHz	2 MB	HD Graphics (4 EUs)	688-854 MHz	2 × DDR3L-1333	10 W	—N/a	FC-BGA 1170	November 2013	FH8065301615009; FH8065301615010; FH8065301615010	$82

=== Airmont-based Celerons ===
==== "Braswell" (14 nm) ====
- All models support: MMX, SSE, SSE2, SSE3, SSSE3, SSE4.1, SSE4.2, Enhanced Intel SpeedStep Technology (EIST), Intel 64, XD bit (an NX bit implementation), Intel VT-x, AES-NI.
- GPU and memory controller are integrated onto the processor die
- GPU is based on Broadwell Intel HD Graphics, with 12 execution units, and supports DirectX 11.2, OpenGL 4.4, OpenGL ES 3.0 and OpenCL 2.0 (on Windows).
- Package size: 25 mm × 27 mm

Model	sSpec number	Cores	Clock rate	Burst	L2 cache	GPU model	GPU frequency	Memory	TDP	SDP	Socket	Release date	Part number(s)	Release price (USD)
Celeron J3060	SR2KR (D1)	2	1.6 GHz	2.48 GHz	1 (Note: 2-core variants are erroneously described as featuring 2 MB L2 cache on Intel ARK, but in fact only have 1 MB L2 cache; see Shvets, Anthony (March 31, 2015). "Intel quietly launches Braswell processors". CPU World.) MB	HD Graphics 400	320-700 MHz	2 × DDR3L-1600	6 W	—N/a	FC-BGA 1170	January 2016	FH8066501715934	$107
Celeron J3160	SR2KS (D1)	4	1.6 GHz	2.24 GHz	2 MB	HD Graphics 400	320-700 MHz	2 × DDR3L-1600	6 W	—N/a	FC-BGA 1170	January 2016	FH8066501715935	$107

=== Haswell-based Celerons ===
==== "Haswell-DT" (22 nm) ====
- All models support: MMX, SSE, SSE2, SSE3, SSSE3, SSE4.1, SSE4.2, Enhanced Intel SpeedStep Technology (EIST), Intel 64, XD bit (an NX bit implementation), Intel VT-x, Smart Cache.
- Haswell Celerons support Quick Sync.
- Haswell-R Celerons G1840, G1850, and G1840T also support Intel Wireless Display.
- Transistors: 1.4 billion
- Die size: 177 mm^{2}
- All models support ECC memory.

Model	sSpec number	Cores	Clock rate	Turbo	L2 cache	L3 cache	GPU model	GPU frequency	TDP	Socket	I/O bus	Release date	Part number(s)	Release price (USD)
standard power
Celeron G1820	SR1CN (C0)	2	2.7 GHz	—N/a	2 × 256 KB	2 MB	Intel Graphics Technology (10 EUs)	350–1050 MHz	53 W	LGA 1150	DMI 2.0	January 2014	CM8064601483405; BX80646G1820; BXC80646G1820	$42
Celeron G1830	SR1NC (C0)	2	2.8 GHz	—N/a	2 × 256 KB	2 MB	HD Graphics (10 EUs)	350–1050 MHz	53 W	LGA 1150	DMI 2.0	January 2014	CM8064601483404; BX80646G1830; BXC80646G1830	$52
Celeron G1840	SR1VK (C0)	2	2.8 GHz	—N/a	2 × 256 KB	2 MB	HD Graphics (10 EUs)	350–1050 MHz	53 W	LGA 1150	DMI 2.0	May 2014	CM8064601483439; BX80646G1840; BXC80646G1840	$42
Celeron G1850	SR1KH (C0)	2	2.9 GHz	—N/a	2 × 256 KB	2 MB	HD Graphics (10 EUs)	350–1050 MHz	53 W	LGA 1150	DMI 2.0	May 2014	CM8064601483406; BX80646G1850; BXC80646G1850	$52
low power
Celeron G1820T	SR1CP (C0)	2	2.4 GHz	—N/a	2 × 256 KB	2 MB	HD Graphics (10 EUs)	200–1050 MHz	35 W	LGA 1150	DMI 2.0	January 2014	CM8064601482617	$42
Celeron G1840T	SR1KA (C0)	2	2.5 GHz	—N/a	2 × 256 KB	2 MB	HD Graphics (10 EUs)	200–1050 MHz	35 W	LGA 1150	DMI 2.0	May 2014	CM8064601482618	$42
low power, embedded
Celeron G1820TE	SR182 (C0); SR1T6 (C0)	2	2.2 GHz	—N/a	2 × 256 KB	2 MB	HD Graphics (10 EUs)	200–1000 MHz	35 W	LGA 1150	DMI 2.0	January 2014	CM8064601484601; CM8064601618705	$42

=== Skylake-based Celerons ===
==== "Skylake-S" (14 nm) ====
- All models support: MMX, SSE, SSE2, SSE3, SSSE3, SSE4.1, SSE4.2, Enhanced Intel SpeedStep Technology (EIST), Intel 64, XD bit (an NX bit implementation), Intel VT-x, Intel VT-d, AES-NI, Smart Cache.
- All models support up to DDR3-1600 or DDR4-2133 memory.
- All models support ECC memory.
- Transistors: TBD
- Die size: TBD

Model	sSpec number	Cores (threads)	Clock rate	Turbo	L2 cache	L3 cache	GPU model	GPU frequency	TDP	Socket	I/O bus	Release date	Part number(s)	Release price (USD)
standard power
Celeron G3900	SR2HV (S0)	2 (2)	2.8 GHz	—N/a	2 × 256 KB	2 MB	HD Graphics 510	350–950 MHz	51 W	LGA 1151	DMI 3.0	January 2016	BX80662G3900; CM8066201928610	$42
Celeron G3920	SR2HX (S0)	2 (2)	2.9 GHz	—N/a	2 × 256 KB	2 MB	HD Graphics 510	350–950 MHz	51 W	LGA 1151	DMI 3.0	January 2016	BX80662G3920; CM8066201928609	$52
low power
Celeron G3900T	SR2HT (S0)	2 (2)	2.6 GHz	—N/a	2 × 256 KB	2 MB	HD Graphics 510	350–950 MHz	35 W	LGA 1151	DMI 3.0	January 2016	CM8066201928505	$42
embedded
Celeron G3900E	SR2GH (R0)	2 (2)	2.4 GHz	—N/a	2 × 256 KB	2 MB	HD Graphics 510	350–950 MHz	35 W	BGA 1440	DMI 3.0	January 2016	CL8066201939703	$107
Celeron G3900TE	SR2LU (R0)	2 (2)	2.3 GHz	—N/a	2 × 256 KB	2 MB	HD Graphics 510	350–950 MHz	35 W	LGA 1151	DMI 3.0	January 2016	CM8066201938802	$42
low power, embedded
Celeron G3902E	SR2GJ (R0)	2 (2)	1.6 GHz	—N/a	2 × 256 KB	2 MB	HD Graphics 510	350–950 MHz	25 W	BGA 1440	DMI 3.0	January 2016	CL8066202400204	$107

=== Goldmont-based Celerons ===
==== "Apollo Lake" (14 nm) ====
- All models support: MMX, SSE, SSE2, SSE3, SSSE3, SSE4.1, SSE4.2, Enhanced Intel SpeedStep Technology (EIST), Intel 64, XD bit (an NX bit implementation), Intel VT-x, Intel VT-d, AES-NI, TXT/TXE
- Package size: 24 mm × 31 mm
- DDR3L/LPDDR3/LPDDR4 dual-channel memory controller supporting up to 8 GB
- Display controller with 1 MIPI DSI port and 2 DDI ports (eDP 1.3, DP 1.1a, or HDMI 1.4b)
- Integrated Intel HD Graphics (Gen9) GPU
- PCI Express 2.0 controller supporting 6 lanes (3 dedicated and 3 multiplexed with USB 3.0); 4 lanes available externally
- Two USB 3.0 ports (1 dual role, 1 dedicated, 3 multiplexed with PCI Express 2.0 and 1 multiplexed with one SATA-300 port)
- Two USB 2.0 ports
- Two SATA-600 ports (one multiplexed with USB 3.0)
- Integrated HD audio controller
- Integrated image signal processor supporting four MIPI CSI ports and 13 MP sensors
- Integrated memory card reader supporting SDIO 3.01 and eMMC 5.0
- Serial I/O supporting SPI, HSUART (serial port) and I2C
- Lacks AVX, AVX2 and older SSE4.2 instruction sets.

Model	sSpec number	Cores	Clock rate	Burst	L2 cache	GPU model	GPU frequency	Memory	TDP	SDP	Socket	Release date	Part number(s)	Release price (USD)
Celeron J3355	SR2Z8 (B1); SREKJ (F1)	2	2 GHz	2.5 GHz	2 MB	HD Graphics 500	250-700 MHz	2 × DDR3L-1866; 2 × LPDDR4-2400	10 W	—N/a	FC-BGA 1296	September 2016	FH8066802986000	$107
Celeron J3455	SR2Z9 (B1); SREKK (F1)	4	1.5 GHz	2.3 GHz	2 MB	HD Graphics 500	250-700 MHz	2 × DDR3L-1866; 2 × LPDDR4-2400	10 W	—N/a	FC-BGA 1296	September 2016	FH8066802986102	$107

=== Goldmont Plus-based Celerons ===
==== "Gemini Lake" (14 nm) ====
- All models support: MMX, SSE, SSE2, SSE3, SSSE3, SSE4.1, SSE4.2, Enhanced Intel SpeedStep Technology (EIST), Intel 64, XD bit (an NX bit implementation), Intel SGX, Intel VT-x, Intel VT-d, AES-NI.
- GPU and memory controller are integrated onto the processor die
- GPU is based on Kaby Lake Intel HD Graphics, with 12 execution units, and supports DirectX 12, OpenGL 4.5, OpenGL ES 3.0 and OpenCL 2.0 (on Windows).
- Package size: 25 mm × 24 mm

Model	sSpec number	Cores	Clock rate	Burst	L2 cache	GPU model	GPU frequency	Memory	TDP	SDP	Socket	Release date	Part number(s)	Release price (USD)
Celeron J4005	SR3S5 (B0)	2	2 GHz	2.7 GHz	4 MB	UHD Graphics 600	250-700 MHz	2 × LPDDR4-2400	10 W	—N/a	FC-BGA 1090	December 2017	FH8068003067416	$107
Celeron J4105	SR3S4 (B0)	4	1.5 GHz	2.5 GHz	4 MB	UHD Graphics 600	250-750 MHz	2 × LPDDR4-2400	10 W	—N/a	FC-BGA 1090	December 2017	FH8068003067403	$107
Celeron J4115	SREZE (B0)	4	1.8 GHz	2.5 GHz	4 MB	UHD Graphics 600	250-750 MHz	2 × LPDDR4-2400	10 W	—N/a	FC-BGA 1090	Q4 2017	FH8068003067432	

==== "Gemini Lake Refresh" (14 nm) ====
- All models support: MMX, SSE, SSE2, SSE3, SSSE3, SSE4.1, SSE4.2, Enhanced Intel SpeedStep Technology (EIST), Intel 64, XD bit (an NX bit implementation), Intel SGX, Intel VT-x, Intel VT-d, AES-NI.
- GPU and memory controller are integrated onto the processor die
- GPU is based on Kaby Lake Intel HD Graphics, with 12 execution units, and supports DirectX 12, OpenGL 4.5, OpenGL ES 3.0 and OpenCL 2.0 (on Windows).
- Package size: 25 mm × 24 mm

Model	sSpec number	Cores	Clock rate	Burst	L2 cache	GPU model	GPU frequency	Memory	TDP	SDP	Socket	Release date	Part number(s)	Release price (USD)
Celeron J4025	SRET3 (R0)	2	2 GHz	2.9 GHz	4 MB	UHD Graphics 600	250-700 MHz	2 × LPDDR4-2400	10 W	—N/a	FC-BGA 1090	November 2019	FH8068003067428	$107
Celeron J4125	SRGZS (R0)	4	2 GHz	2.7 GHz	4 MB	UHD Graphics 600	250-750 MHz	2 × LPDDR4-2400	10 W	—N/a	FC-BGA 1090	November 2019	FH8068003067410	$107

=== Kaby Lake-based Celerons ===
==== "Kaby Lake-S" (14 nm) ====
- All models support: MMX, SSE, SSE2, SSE3, SSSE3, SSE4.1, SSE4.2, Enhanced Intel SpeedStep Technology (EIST), Intel 64, XD bit (an NX bit implementation), Intel VT-x, Intel VT-d, AES-NI, Smart Cache.
- All models support up to DDR3-1600 or DDR4-2400 memory (DDR4-2133 for embedded models).
- All models support ECC memory.
- Transistors: TBD
- Die size: TBD

Model	sSpec number	Cores (threads)	Clock rate	Turbo	L2 cache	L3 cache	GPU model	GPU frequency	TDP	Socket	I/O bus	Release date	Part number(s)	Release price (USD)
standard power
Celeron G3930	SR35K (S0)	2 (2)	2.9 GHz	—N/a	2 × 256 KB	2 MB	HD Graphics 610	350–1050 MHz	51 W	LGA 1151	DMI 3.0	January 2017	BX80677G3930; BXC80677G3930	$42
Celeron G3950	SR35J (S0)	2 (2)	3 GHz	—N/a	2 × 256 KB	2 MB	HD Graphics 610	350–1050 MHz	51 W	LGA 1151	DMI 3.0	January 2017	BX80677G3950	$52
low power
Celeron G3930T	SR35V (S0)	2 (2)	2.7 GHz	—N/a	2 × 256 KB	2 MB	HD Graphics 610	350–1000 MHz	35 W	LGA 1151	DMI 3.0	January 2017	CM8067703016211	$42
standard power, embedded
Celeron G3930E	SR38G (B0)	2 (2)	2.9 GHz	—N/a	2 × 256 KB	2 MB	HD Graphics 610	350–1000 MHz	54 W	LGA 1151	DMI 3.0	June 2017	CM8067703318802	$42
low power, embedded
Celeron G3930TE	SR38H (B0)	2 (2)	2.7 GHz	—N/a	2 × 256 KB	2 MB	HD Graphics 610	350–950 MHz	35 W	LGA 1151	DMI 3.0	June 2017	CM8067703318900	$42

=== Coffee Lake-based Celerons ===
==== "Coffee Lake-S" (14 nm) ====
Model	sSpec number	Cores (threads)	Clock rate	Turbo	L2 cache	L3 cache	GPU model	GPU frequency	TDP	Socket	I/O bus	Release date	Part number(s)	Release price (USD)
Standard power
Celeron G4900	SR3W4 (B0)	2 (2)	3.1 GHz	—N/a	2 × 256 KB	2 MB	UHD Graphics 610	350–1050 MHz	54 W	LGA 1151	DMI 3.0	April 2018	CM8068403378112; BX80684G4900; BXC80684G4900	$42
Celeron G4920	SR3YL (B0)	2 (2)	3.2 GHz	—N/a	2 × 256 KB	2 MB	UHD Graphics 610	350–1050 MHz	54 W	LGA 1151	DMI 3.0	April 2018	CM8068403378011; BX80684G4920	$52
Celeron G4930	SR3YN (B0)	2 (2)	3.2 GHz	—N/a	2 × 256 KB	2 MB	UHD Graphics 610	350–1050 MHz	54 W	LGA 1151	DMI 3.0	April 2019	CM8068403378114	$42
Celeron G4950	SR3YM (B0)	2 (2)	3.3 GHz	—N/a	2 × 256 KB	2 MB	UHD Graphics 610	350–1050 MHz	54 W	LGA 1151	DMI 3.0	April 2019	CM8068403378012	$52
Low power
Celeron G4900T	SR3YP (B0)	2 (2)	2.9 GHz	—N/a	2 × 256 KB	2 MB	UHD Graphics 610	350–1000 MHz	35 W	LGA 1151	DMI 3.0	April 2018	CM8068403379312	$42
Celeron G4930T	SR3YQ (B0)	2 (2)	3 GHz	—N/a	2 × 256 KB	2 MB	UHD Graphics 610	350–1000 MHz	35 W	LGA 1151	DMI 3.0	April 2019	CM8068403379313	$42

==== "Coffee Lake-H" (14 nm) ====
Model	sSpec number	Cores (threads)	Clock rate	Turbo	L2 cache	L3 cache	GPU model	GPU frequency	TDP	Socket	I/O bus	Release date	Part number(s)	Release price (USD)
Embedded
Celeron G4930E	SRFEE (U0)	2 (2)	2.4 GHz	—N/a	2 × 256 KB	2 MB	UHD Graphics 610	350–1050 MHz	35 W	BGA 1440	DMI 3.0	June 2019	CL8068404164900	$107
Low power, embedded
Celeron G4932E	SRFEL (U0)	2 (2)	1.9 GHz	—N/a	2 × 256 KB	2 MB	UHD Graphics 610	350–1050 MHz	25 W	BGA 1440	DMI 3.0	June 2019	CL8068404165500	$107

=== Comet Lake-based Celerons ===
==== "Comet Lake-S" (14 nm) ====
Model	sSpec number	Cores (threads)	Clock rate	Turbo	L2 cache	L3 cache	GPU model	GPU frequency	TDP	Socket	I/O bus	Release date	Part number(s)	Release price (USD)
Standard power
Celeron G5900	SRH44 (G1)	2 (2)	3.4 GHz	—N/a	2 × 256 KB	2 MB	UHD Graphics 610	350–1050 MHz	58 W	LGA 1200	DMI 3.0	April 2020	BX80701G5900; BXC80701G5900; CM8070104292110	$42
Celeron G5905	SRK27 (G1)	2 (2)	3.5 GHz	—N/a	2 × 256 KB	4 MB	UHD Graphics 610	350–1050 MHz	58 W	LGA 1200	DMI 3.0	July 2020	BX80701G5905; CM8070104292115	$42
Celeron G5920	SRH42 (G1)	2 (2)	3.5 GHz	—N/a	2 × 256 KB	2 MB	UHD Graphics 610	350–1050 MHz	58 W	LGA 1200	DMI 3.0	April 2020	BX80701G5920; BXC80701G5920; CM8070104292010	$52
Celeron G5925	SRK26 (G1)	2 (2)	3.6 GHz	—N/a	2 × 256 KB	4 MB	UHD Graphics 610	350–1050 MHz	58 W	LGA 1200	DMI 3.0	July 2020	BX80701G5925; CM8070104292013	$52
Standard power, embedded
Celeron G5900E	SRH7T (G1)	2 (2)	3.2 GHz	—N/a	2 × 256 KB	2 MB	UHD Graphics 610	350–1000 MHz	58 W	LGA 1200	DMI 3.0	April 2020	CM8070104424111	$44
Low power
Celeron G5900T	SRH46 (G1)	2 (2)	3.2 GHz	—N/a	2 × 256 KB	2 MB	UHD Graphics 610	350–1000 MHz	35 W	LGA 1200	DMI 3.0	April 2020	CM8070104292207	$42
Celeron G5905T	SRK28 (G1)	2 (2)	3.3 GHz	—N/a	2 × 256 KB	4 MB	UHD Graphics 610	350–1000 MHz	35 W	LGA 1200	DMI 3.0	July 2020	CM8070104292213	$42
Low power, embedded
Celeron G5900TE	SRH6J (G1)	2 (2)	3 GHz	—N/a	2 × 256 KB	2 MB	UHD Graphics 610	350–1000 MHz	35 W	LGA 1200	DMI 3.0	April 2020	CM8070104424010	$44

=== Tremont-based Celerons ===
==== "Jasper Lake" (10 nm) ====
- All models support: MMX, SSE, SSE2, SSE3, SSSE3, SSE4.1, SSE4.2, Enhanced Intel SpeedStep Technology (EIST), Intel 64,

XD bit (an NX bit implementation), Intel VT-x, Intel VT-d, AES-NI, Intel SHA Extensions, Intel SGX, SMAP/SMEP

- Display controller with 1 MIPI DSI 1.2 port and 3 DDI ports (eDP 1.4b, MIPI DSI 1.2, DP 1.4a, or HDMI 2.0b)
- Integrated Intel HD Graphics (Gen11) GPU
- PCI Express 3.0 controller supporting 8 lanes (multiplexed); 4 lanes available externally
- DDR4/LPDDR4 dual-channel memory controller supporting up to 16 GB
- Two USB 3.2 2x1 ports (a.k.a. USB 3.1)
- Four USB 3.2 1x1 ports (a.k.a. USB 3.0)
- Eight USB 2.0 ports
- Two SATA-600 ports
- Package size: 35 mm x 24 mm
- Integrated HD audio controller
- Integrated image signal processor supporting four cameras (three concurrent)
- Integrated memory card reader supporting SDIO 3.0 and eMMC 5.1
- Serial I/O supporting SPI, HSUART (serial port) and I2C
- Integrated CNVi with Wi-Fi 6 (802.11ax 1x1 and 2x2) and Bluetooth 5.x (using UART/I2S/USB2)

Model	sSpec number	Cores	Clock rate	Burst	L2 cache	L3 cache	GPU model	GPU frequency	Memory	TDP	Socket	Release date	Part number(s)	Release price (USD)
Celeron N5095	SRKGX (A1)	4	2.0 GHz	2.9 GHz	1.5 MB	4 MB	UHD Graphics (16 EUs)	450-750 MHz	2× DDR4 / LPDDR4X-2933	15 W	FC-BGA 1338	January 2021	DC8069704609810	

=== Golden Cove-based Celerons ===
==== "Alder Lake" (Intel 7) ====
- All models support: SSE4.1, SSE4.2, AVX, AVX2, FMA3, Enhanced Intel SpeedStep Technology (EIST), Intel 64, XD bit

(an NX bit implementation), Intel VT-x, Intel VT-d, AES-NI, Smart Cache, DL Boost, GNA 3.0, and Optane memory.

- All models support up to DDR5-4800 or DDR4-3200 memory, and 16 lanes of PCI Express 5.0 + 4 lanes of PCIe 4.0.

Model number	Cores (threads)	Freq.	L2 cache	L3 cache	GPU model	GPU frequency	Power	Socket	I/O bus	Release date	sSpec number	Part number(s)	Release price (USD)
Model number	Cores (threads)	Freq.	L2 cache	L3 cache	GPU model	GPU frequency	Base	Socket	I/O bus	Release date	sSpec number	Part number(s)	Release price (USD)
Standard power
Celeron G6900	2 (2)	3.4 GHz	2× 1.25 MB	4 MB	UHD 710	300–1300 MHz	46 W	LGA 1700	DMI; 4.0 ×8	January 2022	SRL67 (H0)	CM8071504651805; BX80715G6900	$42
Standard power, embedded
Celeron G6900E	2 (2)	3.0 GHz	2× 1.25 MB	4 MB	UHD 710	300–1300 MHz	46 W	LGA 1700	DMI; 4.0 ×8	January 2022	SRL6Q (H0)	CM8071504653807	$44
Low power
Celeron G6900T	2 (2)	2.8 GHz	2× 1.25 MB	4 MB	UHD 710	300–1300 MHz	35 W	LGA 1700	DMI; 4.0 ×8	January 2022	SRL68 (H0)	CM8071504651904	$42
Low power, embedded
Celeron G6900TE	2 (2)	2.4 GHz	2× 1.25 MB	4 MB	UHD 710	300–1300 MHz	35 W	LGA 1700	DMI; 4.0 ×8	January 2022	SRL6P (H0)	CM8071504653706	$44

== Mobile processors ==
=== P6-based Celerons ===
==== Mobile Celeron (single-core) ====
===== "Mendocino" (250 nm) =====
- All models support: MMX

Model	Clock rate	L2 cache	FSB	Mult.	Voltage	TDP	Socket	Release date	Release price (USD)
Mobile Celeron 266	267 MHz	128 KB	66 MT/s	4×	1.5 V	9.8 W	μPGA2; BGA2	January 1999	$106
Mobile Celeron 300	300 MHz	128 KB	66 MT/s	4.5×	1.6 V	11.1 W	μPGA2; BGA2	January 1999	$187
Mobile Celeron 333	333 MHz	128 KB	66 MT/s	5×	1.6 V	11.8 W	μPGA2; BGA2	April 1999	$159
Mobile Celeron 366	367 MHz	128 KB	66 MT/s	5.5×	1.6 V	13.1 W	μPGA2; BGA2	May 1999	$170
Mobile Celeron 400	400 MHz	128 KB	66 MT/s	6×	1.6 V	13.8 W	μPGA2; BGA2	June 1999	$187
Mobile Celeron 433	433 MHz	128 KB	66 MT/s	6.5×	1.9 V	19.4 W	μPGA2; BGA2	September 1999	$159
Mobile Celeron 466	467 MHz	128 KB	66 MT/s	7×	1.9 V	20.7 W	μPGA2; BGA2	September 1999	$209
Mobile Celeron LV 266	267 MHz	128 KB	66 MT/s	4×	1.5 V	7.9 W	BGA2	April 1999	

===== "Coppermine-128" (180 nm) =====
- All models support: MMX, SSE

Model	Clock rate	L2 cache	FSB	Mult.	Voltage	TDP	Socket	Release date	Release price (USD)
Mobile Celeron 450	450 MHz	128 KB	100 MT/s	4.5×	1.6 V	15.5 W	Socket 495; BGA2	February 14, 2000	$96
Mobile Celeron 500	500 MHz	128 KB	100 MT/s	5×	1.6 V	16.8 W	Socket 495; BGA2	February 14, 2000	$134
Mobile Celeron 550	550 MHz	128 KB	100 MT/s	5.5×	1.6 V	18.4 W	Socket 495; BGA2	April 24, 2000	$170
Mobile Celeron 600	600 MHz	128 KB	100 MT/s	6×	1.6 V	13 W	Socket 495; BGA2	June 19, 2000	$134
Mobile Celeron 650	650 MHz	128 KB	100 MT/s	6.5×	1.6 V	14 W	Socket 495; BGA2	June 19, 2000	$181
Mobile Celeron 700	700 MHz	128 KB	100 MT/s	7×	1.6 V	15 W	Socket 495; BGA2	September 25, 2000	$181
Mobile Celeron 750	750 MHz	128 KB	100 MT/s	7.5×	1.6 V	15.8 W	Socket 495; BGA2	March 19, 2001	$170
Mobile Celeron 800	800 MHz	128 KB	100 MT/s	8×	1.6 V	17.6 W	Socket 495; BGA2	May 21, 2001	$170
Mobile Celeron 850	850 MHz	128 KB	100 MT/s	8.5×	1.6 V	18.8 W	Socket 495; BGA2	July 2, 2001	$134
Mobile Celeron 900	900 MHz	128 KB	100 MT/s	9×	1.7 V	24 W	Socket 495; BGA2	October 1, 2001	$134
Mobile Celeron LV 400	400 MHz	128 KB	100 MT/s	4×	1.35 V	6.5 W	BGA2	February 14, 2000	$96
Mobile Celeron LV 500	500 MHz	128 KB	100 MT/s	5×	1.35 V	12.2 W	BGA2	June 19, 2000	$134
Mobile Celeron LV 600	600 MHz	128 KB	100 MT/s	6×	1.35 V	14.4 W	BGA2	May 21, 2001	$134
Mobile Celeron ULV 500	500 MHz	128 KB	100 MT/s	5×	1.1 V	8.1 W	BGA2	January 2001	
Mobile Celeron ULV 600	600 MHz	128 KB	100 MT/s	6×	1.1 V	9.7 W	BGA2	May 21, 2001	$144

===== "Coppermine T" (180 nm) =====
- All models support: MMX, SSE

Model	Clock rate	L2 cache	FSB	Mult.	Voltage	TDP	Socket	Release date	Release price (USD)
Mobile Celeron 733	733 MHz	128 KB	133 MT/s	5.5×	1.7 V	20.6 W	Socket 495; BGA2	October 1, 2001	$75
Mobile Celeron 800A	800 MHz	128 KB	133 MT/s	6×	1.7 V	22 W	Socket 495; BGA2	October 1, 2001	$91
Mobile Celeron 866	867 MHz	128 KB	133 MT/s	6.5×	1.7 V	23.3 W	Socket 495; BGA2	October 1, 2001	$107
Mobile Celeron 933	933 MHz	128 KB	133 MT/s	7×	1.7 V	20.6 W	Socket 495; BGA2	October 1, 2001	$134

===== "Tualatin-256" (130 nm) =====
- All models support: MMX, SSE

Model number	sSpec number	Freq. (MHz)	L2 Cache (KB)	FSB (MHz)	Mult	Voltage (V)	TDP (W)	Socket	Release date	Part number(s)	Release price (USD)
standard voltage
Mobile Celeron 1000	SL6B3 (B1); SL693 (A1); SL6AB (B1); SL694 (A1)	1000	256	133	7.5×	1.40	22	PBGA 479; PPGA 478	Apr 17 2002	RH80530NZ001256	$107
Mobile Celeron 1066	SL6H7 (B1); SL643 (A1); SL64M (A1)	1066	256	133	8×	1.45	23.2	PPGA 478	Jan 21 2002	RH80530NZ004256	$107
Mobile Celeron 1133	SL6H8 (B1); SL642 (A1); SL64L (A1)	1133	256	133	8.5×	1.45	23.8	PPGA 478	Jan 21 2002	RH80530NZ006256	$134
Mobile Celeron 1200	SL6H9 (B1); SL64K (A1); SL63Z (A1)	1200	256	133	9×	1.45	24.4	PPGA 478	Jan 21 2002	RH80530NZ009256	$170
Mobile Celeron 1266	SL6Z9 (B1)	1266	256	133	9.5×	1.40	22	PPGA 478	Apr 16 2003	RH80530NZ012256	
Mobile Celeron 1333	SL6HA (B1); SL6ZA (B1); SL68J (A1)	1333	256	133	10×	1.5	19	PPGA 478	Jun 24 2002	RH80530WZ014256	$134
low voltage
Mobile Celeron LV 650	SL6B6 (B1); SL5YA (A1)	650	256	100	6.5×	1.15	10.6	PBGA 479	Oct 1 2001	RJ80530MY650256	$134
Mobile Celeron LV 667	SL63D (A1)	667	256	133	5×	1.15		PBGA 479	Sep 16 2002	RJ80530MZ667256	
Mobile Celeron LV 733	SL6B4 (B1); SL68M (A1)	733	256	133	5.5×	1.15	11.2	PBGA 479	Apr 17 2002	RJ80530MZ733256	$134
Mobile Celeron LV 866	SL6CY (B1)	866	256	133	6.5×	1.15	9.61	PBGA 479	Jan 14 2003	RJ80530MZ866256	
ultra-low voltage
Mobile Celeron ULV 650	SL6B8 (B1); SL63F (A1)	650	256	100	6.5×	1.1	7	PBGA 479	Jan 21 2002	RJ80530VY650256	$144
Mobile Celeron ULV 700	SL6CZ (B1)	700	256	100	7×	1.1	7	PBGA 479	Sep 16 2002	RJ80530VY700256	$144
Mobile Celeron ULV 733	SL6D2 (B1)	733	256	133	5.5×	1.1	7	PBGA 479	Sep 16 2002	RJ80530VZ733256	$144
Mobile Celeron ULV 800	SL6D4 (B1)	800	256	133	6×	1.1	7	PBGA 479	Jan 14 2003	RJ80530VZ800256	

=== NetBurst-based Celerons ===
==== Mobile Celeron (single-core) ====
===== "Northwood-256" (130 nm) =====
- All models support: MMX, SSE, SSE2

Model number	sSpec number	Freq. (GHz)	L2 Cache (KB)	FSB (MHz)	Mult	Voltage (V)	TDP (W)	Socket	Release date	Part number(s)	Release price (USD)
Mobile Celeron 1.2	SL7MG (D1)	1.2	256	400	12×	1.3	20.8	PPGA 478	May 2002	RH80532NC009256	
Mobile Celeron 1.4	SL6FM (B0); SL6M4 (C1)	1.4	256	400	14×	1.3	30	PPGA 478	Jun 24 2002	RH80532NC017256	$149
Mobile Celeron 1.5	SL6FN (B0); SL6M5 (C1)	1.5	256	400	15×	1.3	30	PPGA 478	Jun 24 2002	RH80532NC021256	$170
Mobile Celeron 1.6	SL6J2 (C1)	1.6	256	400	16×	1.3	30	PPGA 478	Sep 16 2002	RH80532NC025256	$112
Mobile Celeron 1.7	SL6J3 (C1); SL6VG (D1)	1.7	256	400	17×	1.3	30	PPGA 478	Sep 16 2002	RH80532NC029256	$134
Mobile Celeron 1.8	SL6J4 (C1); SL6VH (D1)	1.8	256	400	18×	1.3	30	PPGA 478	Sep 16 2002	RH80532NC033256	$149
Mobile Celeron 2.0	SL6QH (C1); SL6VJ (D1)	2.0	256	400	20×	1.3	32	PPGA 478	Jan 14 2003	RH80532NC041256	
Mobile Celeron 2.2	SL6ZW (C0); SL73Y (D1); SL8SB (D1)	2.2	256	400	22×	1.3	35	PPGA 478	Apr 16 2003	RH80532NC049256	
Mobile Celeron 2.4	SL75J (D1)	2.4	256	400	24×	1.3	35	PPGA 478	Jun 11 2003	RH80532NC056256	
Mobile Celeron 2.5	SL75T (D1)	2.5	256	400	25×	1.3	35	PPGA 478	Nov 12 2003	RH80532NC060256	

=== Pentium-M-based Celerons ===
==== Celeron M (single-core) ====
===== "Banias-512" (130 nm) =====
- All models support: MMX, SSE, SSE2

Model	Clock rate	L2 cache	FSB	Mult.	Voltage	TDP	Socket	Release date	Release price (USD)
Celeron M 310	1.2 GHz	512 KB	400 MT/s	12×	1.356 V	24.5 W	Socket 479/FC-μBGA; Socket 479/FC-μPGA	January 5, 2004	$107
Celeron M 320	1.3 GHz	512 KB	400 MT/s	13×	1.356 V	24.5 W	Socket 479/FC-μBGA; Socket 479/FC-μBGA; Socket 479/FC-μPGA; Socket 479/FC-μPGA	January 5, 2004	$134
Celeron M 330	1.4 GHz	512 KB	400 MT/s	14×	1.356 V	24.5 W	Socket 479/FC-μBGA; Socket 479/FC-μPGA; Socket 479/FC-μPGA	April 7, 2004	$134
Celeron M 340	1.5 GHz	512 KB	400 MT/s	15×	1.356 V	24.5 W	Socket 479/FC-μBGA; Socket 479/FC-μPGA; Socket 479/FC-μPGA	June 1, 2004	$134
Celeron M ULV 600	600 MHz	512 KB	400 MT/s	6×	1.004 V	7 W	Socket 479/FC-μBGA; Socket 479/FC-μBGA	June 2004	
Celeron M ULV 800	800 MHz	512 KB	400 MT/s	8×	1.004 V	7 W	Socket 479/FC-μBGA	January 5, 2004	$161
Celeron M ULV 333	900 MHz	512 KB	400 MT/s	9×	1.004 V	7 W	Socket 479/FC-μBGA	April 7, 2004	$161

===== "Dothan-1024" (90 nm) =====
- All models support: MMX, SSE, SSE2
- XD bit (an NX bit implementation): supported by 360J, 370, 380, 390, 383

Model	Clock rate	L2 cache	FSB	Mult.	Voltage	TDP	Socket	Release date	Release price (USD)
Celeron M 350	1.3 GHz	1 MB	400 MT/s	13×	1.004–1.292 V	21 W	Socket 479/FC-μPGA; Socket 479/FC-μBGA; Socket 479/FC-μPGA; Socket 479/FC-μBGA; Socket 479/FC-μPGA; Socket 479/FC-μBGA	August 2004	
Celeron M 360	1.4 GHz	1 MB	400 MT/s	14×	1.004–1.292 V	21 W	Socket 479/FC-μPGA; Socket 479/FC-μBGA; Socket 479/FC-μPGA; Socket 479/FC-μBGA; Socket 479/FC-μPGA; Socket 479/FC-μBGA	August 2004	
Celeron M 370	1.5 GHz	1 MB	400 MT/s	15×	1.004–1.292 V	21 W	Socket 479/FC-μPGA; Socket 479/FC-μBGA; Socket 479/FC-μPGA; Socket 479/FC-μBGA; Socket 479/FC-μPGA; Socket 479/FC-μBGA	January 2005	
Celeron M 380	1.6 GHz	1 MB	400 MT/s	16×	1.004–1.292 V	21 W	Socket 479/FC-μPGA; Socket 479/FC-μBGA; Socket 479/FC-μPGA; Socket 479/FC-μBGA	July 2005	
Celeron M 390	1.7 GHz	1 MB	400 MT/s	17×	1.004–1.292 V	21 W	Socket 479/FC-μPGA; Socket 479/FC-μBGA; Socket 479/FC-μBGA	December 2005	
Celeron M ULV 383	1 GHz	1 MB	400 MT/s	10×	0.876–0.956 V	5.5 W	Socket 479/FC-μBGA	July 2005	

===== "Dothan-512" (90 nm) =====
- All models support: MMX, SSE, SSE2, XD bit (an NX bit implementation)

Model	Clock rate	L2 cache	FSB	Mult.	Voltage	TDP	Socket	Release date	Release price (USD)
Celeron 205	1.2 GHz	512 KB	400 MT/s	12×	1.26 V	21 W	Socket 479/FC-μBGA	March 2007	
Celeron M ULV 353	900 MHz	512 KB	400 MT/s	9×	0.876–0.94 V	5 W	Socket 479/FC-μBGA	July 20, 2004	$54
Celeron M ULV 373	1 GHz	512 KB	400 MT/s	10×	0.876–0.94 V	5.5 W	Socket 479/FC-μBGA	January 2005	$74

===== "Yonah-512" (65 nm) =====
- All models support: MMX, SSE, SSE2, SSE3, XD bit (an NX bit implementation)
- Steppings: C0

Model	Clock rate	L2 cache	FSB	Mult.	Voltage	TDP	Socket	Release date	Release price (USD)
Celeron 215	1.33 GHz	512 KB	533 MT/s	10×	1.0–1.3 V	27 W	Socket M	August 2007	$54

===== "Yonah-1024" (65 nm) =====
- All models support: MMX, SSE, SSE2, SSE3, XD bit (an NX bit implementation)
- Steppings: C0, D0

Model	Clock rate	L2 cache	FSB	Mult.	Voltage	TDP	Socket	Release date	Release price (USD)
Celeron M 410	1.47 GHz	1 MB	533 MT/s	11×	1.0–1.3 V	27 W	Socket M	April 2006	$54
Celeron M 420	1.6 GHz	1 MB	533 MT/s	12×	1.0–1.3 V	27 W	Socket M	April 2006	$107
Celeron M 430	1.73 GHz	1 MB	533 MT/s	13×	1.0–1.3 V	27 W	Socket M	April 2006	$134
Celeron M 440	1.87 GHz	1 MB	533 MT/s	14×	1.0–1.3 V	27 W	Socket M; PBGA479	October 2006	$107
Celeron M 450	2 GHz	1 MB	533 MT/s	15×	1.0–1.3 V	27 W	Socket M	October 2006	$134
Celeron M ULV 423	1.07 GHz	1 MB	533 MT/s	8×	0.95–0.975 V	5.5 W	FCBGA6	April 2006	$161
Celeron M ULV 443	1.2 GHz	1 MB	533 MT/s	9×	0.95–0.975 V	5.5 W	FCBGA6	September 2006	$161

===== "Sossaman" (65 nm) =====
- All models support: MMX, SSE, SSE2, SSE3, Enhanced Intel SpeedStep Technology (EIST), XD bit (an NX bit implementation), Intel VT-x
- Die size: 90.3 mm^{2}
- Steppings: D0

Model	Clock rate	L2 cache	FSB	Mult.	Voltage	TDP	Socket	Release date	Release price (USD)
Celeron 1.66	1.67 GHz	1 MB	667 MT/s	10×	1.1125–1.25 V	27 W	Socket M	March 2006	$84
Celeron 1.83	1.83 GHz	1 MB	667 MT/s	11×	1.1125–1.25 V	27 W	Socket M	January 2007	

=== Core-based Celerons ===
==== Celeron M/Celeron (single-core) ====
===== "Merom", "Merom-L" (standard-voltage, 65 nm) =====
- All models support: MMX, SSE, SSE2, SSE3, SSSE3, Intel 64, XD bit (an NX bit implementation)
- Steppings: B2, E1, G0, G2, A1

Model	sSpec number	Cores	Clock rate	L2 cache	FSB	Mult.	Voltage	TDP	Socket	Release date	Part number(s)	Release price (USD)
Celeron M 520	SL9WT (B2); SL9WN (A1)	1	1.6 GHz	1 MB	533 MT/s	12×	0.95–1.3 V	30 W	Socket M	January, 2007	LF80537NE0251M	$134
Celeron M 530	SL9UY (B2); SLGFL (G2); SL9VA (A1); SLA2G (A1); SLA6Y (B2); SLGFY (G2)	1	1.73 GHz	1 MB	533 MT/s	13×	0.95–1.3 V	30 W	Socket M; Socket M; Socket M; Socket M; FCBGA6; FCBGA6	March 2007	LF80537NE0301M; LF80537NE0301M; LF80537NE0301M; LF80537NE0301M; LE80537NE0301M; LE80537NE0301M	$134
Celeron 530	SLA48 (E1); SLA2G (A1)	1	1.73 GHz	1 MB	533 MT/s	13×	0.95–1.3 V	27 W	Socket P	March 2007	LF80537NE0301M; LF80537NE0301MN	$70
Celeron 540	SLA47 (E1); SLA2F (A1)	1	1.87 GHz	1 MB	533 MT/s	14×	0.95–1.3 V	30 W	Socket P	July 2007	LF80537NE0361M	$134
Celeron 550	SLAJ9 (G0); SLA2E (A1); SLALD (G0)	1	2 GHz	1 MB	533 MT/s	15×	0.95–1.3 V	31 W	Socket P; Socket P; FCBGA6	5 September 2007	LF80537NE0411M; LE80537NE0411M; LE80537NE0411M	$134
Celeron 560	SLA2D (A1)	1	2.13 GHz	1 MB	533 MT/s	16×	0.95–1.3 V	31 W	Socket P	December 2007	LF80537NE0461M	$134
Celeron 570	SLA2C (A1)	1	2.27 GHz	1 MB	533 MT/s	17×	0.95–1.3 V	31 W	Socket P	May 2008	LF80537NE0511M	$134

===== "Merom-2M" (standard-voltage, 65 nm) =====
- All models support: MMX, SSE, SSE2, SSE3, SSSE3, Intel 64, XD bit (an NX bit implementation)
- Steppings: M0

Model	sSpec number	Cores	Clock rate	L2 cache	FSB	Mult.	Voltage	TDP	Socket	Release date	Part number(s)	Release price (USD)
Celeron 575	SLB6M (M0)	1	2 GHz	1 MB	667 MT/s	12×	1.075–1.175 V	31 W	Socket P	September 2008	LF80537NF0411M	$86
Celeron 585	SLB6L (M0)	1	2.17 GHz	1 MB	667 MT/s	13×	1.075–1.175 V	31 W	Socket P	September 2008	LF80537NF0481M	$107

===== "Merom-L" (ultra-low-voltage, 65 nm) =====
- All models support: MMX, SSE, SSE2, SSE3, SSSE3, Intel 64, XD bit (an NX bit implementation)
- Steppings: A1, M1

Model	sSpec number	Cores	Clock rate	L2 cache	FSB	Mult.	Voltage	TDP	Socket	Release date	Part number(s)	Release price (USD)
Celeron M ULV 523	SLAHP (A1)	1	933 MHz	1 MB	533 MT/s	7×	0.85–1.1 V	5.5 W	FCBGA6	September 2007	LE80537VE9331M	$161
Celeron ULV 573	SLGMV (M1)	1	1 GHz	512 KB	533 MT/s	7.5×	0.8–0.975 V	10 W	FCBGA6	June 2009	LE80537VE001512	

==== Celeron (single-core) ====
===== "Penryn-3M" (45 nm) =====
- All models support: MMX, SSE, SSE2, SSE3, SSSE3, Intel 64, XD bit (an NX bit implementation)
- Package size: 35 mm^{2} (standard voltage), 22 mm^{2} (low voltage)
- Steppings: R0
- Die size: 107 mm^{2}

Model	sSpec number	Cores	Clock rate	L2 cache	FSB	Mult.	Voltage	TDP	Socket	Release date	Part number(s)	Release price (USD)
standard voltage
Celeron 900	SLGLQ (R0)	1	2.2 GHz	1 MB	800 MT/s	11×	1–1.25 V	35 W	Socket P	March 2009	AW80585NG0491MA	$70
Celeron 925	SLGLN (R0)	1	2.3 GHz	1 MB	800 MT/s	11.5×	1–1.25 V	35 W	Socket P	January 2011	AW80585NG0521MA	$70
ultra-low voltage
Celeron M ULV 722	SLGAT (M0); SLGAN (R0)	1	1.2 GHz	1 MB	800 MT/s	6×	0.775–1.1 V	5.5 W	μFC-BGA 956	September 2008	AV80585VG0091MP	
Celeron M ULV 723	SLGAS (M0); SLGAM (R0)	1	1.2 GHz	1 MB	800 MT/s	6×	1.05–1.15 V	10 W	μFC-BGA 956	September 2008	AV80585VG0091M	$107
Celeron M ULV 743	SLGEV (R0)	1	1.3 GHz	1 MB	800 MT/s	6.5×	1.05–1.15 V	10 W	μFC-BGA 956	September 2009	AV80585VG0131M	$107
Celeron ULV 763	SLGQQ (R0)	1	1.4 GHz	1 MB	800 MT/s	7×	1.05–1.15 V	10 W	μFC-BGA 956	January 2011	AV80585VG0171M	$107

- Note that 900 has also been used for three earlier models of Intel Celeron microprocessors with different microarchitectures.
- Intel initially listed the Celeron 900 as Dual-Core and with Virtualization Technology in its Processorfinder and ARK databases, which caused confusion among customers.
- ULV 723 possibly supports EIST, but Intel's web site is inconsistent about this.

==== Celeron (dual-core) ====
===== "Merom-2M" (65 nm) =====
- All models support: MMX, SSE, SSE2, SSE3, SSSE3, Intel 64, XD bit (an NX bit implementation)
- Steppings: M0

Model	sSpec number	Cores	Clock rate	L2 cache	FSB	Mult.	Voltage	TDP	Socket	Release date	Part number(s)	Release price (USD)
Celeron T1400	SLAQL (M0)	2	1.73 GHz	512 KB	533 MT/s	13×	1.075–1.175 V	35 W	Socket P	July 2008	LF80537NE030512	
Celeron T1500	SLAQK (M0)	2	1.87 GHz	512 KB	533 MT/s	14×	1.075–1.175 V	35 W	Socket P	July 2008	LF80537NE036512	$59
Celeron T1600	SLB6J (M0)	2	1.67 GHz	1 MB	667 MT/s	10×	1.075–1.175 V	35 W	Socket P	December 2008	LF80537NF0281MN	$80
Celeron T1700	SLB6H (M0)	2	1.83 GHz	1 MB	667 MT/s	11×	1.075–1.175 V	35 W	Socket P	December 2008	LF80537NF0341MN	$86

- Note that Intel has also released Core Solo microprocessors with the model numbers T1400, T1500, and T1600.
- T1700 possibly supports EIST, but Intel's web site is inconsistent about this.

===== "Penryn-3M" (45 nm) =====
- Based on Core microarchitecture
- All models support: MMX, SSE, SSE2, SSE3, SSSE3, Intel 64, XD bit (an NX bit implementation)
- Steppings: R0

Model	sSpec number	Cores	Clock rate	L2 cache	FSB	Mult.	Voltage	TDP	Socket	Release date	Part number(s)	Release price (USD)
standard voltage
Celeron T3000	SLGMY (R0)	2	1.8 GHz	1 MB	800 MT/s	9×	1–1.25 V	35 W	Socket P	June 2009	AW80577GG0331ML	$80
Celeron T3100	SLGEY (R0); SLGVS (R0)	2	1.9 GHz	1 MB	800 MT/s	9.5×	1–1.25 V	35 W	Socket P BGA479	June 2009	AW80577GG0371ML; AV80577NG0371M	$80 $86
Celeron T3300	SLGJW (R0); SLG92 (R0)	2	2 GHz	1 MB	800 MT/s	10×	1–1.25 V	35 W	Socket P BGA479	January 2010	AW80577GG0411ML; AW80577NG0411M	$86
Celeron T3500	SLGJV (R0)	2	2.1 GHz	1 MB	800 MT/s	10.5×	1–1.25 V	35 W	Socket P BGA479	September 2010	AW80577GG0451ML	$80
ultra-low voltage
Celeron SU2300	SLGSB (R0); SLGYW (R0)	2	1.2 GHz	1 MB	800 MT/s	6×	1.05–1.15 V	10 W	μFC-BGA 956	September 2009	AV80577UG0091M; AV80577UG0091ML	$134

- Note that the Pentium T3x00 processors have a similar number but are based on the older Merom-2M chips.
- Note that the Pentium SU2xxx processors have a similar number but are single-core processors.

=== Westmere-based Celerons ===
==== Celeron (dual-core) ====
===== "Arrandale" (MCP, 32 nm) =====
- Based on Westmere microarchitecture
- All models support: MMX, SSE, SSE2, SSE3, SSSE3, Enhanced Intel SpeedStep Technology (EIST),

Intel 64, XD bit (an NX bit implementation), Intel VT-x, Smart Cache

- P4505 and U3405 support memory ECC RAM and PCIe bifurcation.
- FSB has been replaced with DMI.
- Contains 45 nm "Ironlake" GPU.
- Die size: 81 mm^{2}
- Graphics and Integrated Memory Controller die size: 114 mm^{2}
- Steppings: C2, K0

Model	sSpec number	Clock rate	Turbo	GPU frequency	Cores	L2 cache	L3 cache	I/O bus	Mult.	Memory	Voltage	TDP	Socket	Release date	Part number(s)	Release price (USD)
standard power
Celeron P4500	SLBNL (C2); SLBUX (K0)	1.87 GHz	—N/a	500–667 MHz	2	2 × 256 KB	2 MB	DMI	14×	2 × DDR3-1066	0.775–1.4 V	35 W	Socket G1	March 2010	CP8061700 4803AA	$86
Celeron P4505	SLBQB (C2); SLBXG (K0)	1.87 GHz	—N/a	500–667 MHz	2	2 × 256 KB	2 MB	DMI	14×	2 × DDR3-1066	0.775–1.4 V	35 W	BGA-1288	March 2010	CN8061700 4545AF	OEM
Celeron P4600	SLBZY (K0)	2 GHz	—N/a	500–667 MHz	2	2 × 256 KB	2 MB	DMI	15×	2 × DDR3-1066	0.775–1.4 V	35 W	Socket G1	Sept 2010	CP8061700 5307AB	$86
ultra-low power
Celeron U3400	SLBUE (K0)	1.07 GHz	—N/a	166–500 MHz	2	2 × 256 KB	2 MB	DMI	8×	2 × DDR3-800	0.725–1.4 V	18 W	BGA-1288	May 2010	CN8061700 6039AA	$134
Celeron U3405	SLBWX (K0)	1.07 GHz	—N/a	166-500 MHz	2	2 × 256 KB	2 MB	DMI	8×	2 × DDR3-1066	0.725–1.4 V	18 W	BGA-1288	August 2010	CN8061700 6201AA	OEM
Celeron U3600	SLBSP (K0)	1.2 GHz	—N/a	166–500 MHz	2	2 × 256 KB	2 MB	DMI	9×	2 × DDR3-800	0.725–1.4 V	18 W	BGA-1288	January 2011	CN8061700 5199AB	$134

=== Sandy Bridge-based Celerons ===
==== "Sandy Bridge" (32 nm) ====
- All models support: MMX, SSE, SSE2, SSE3, SSSE3, SSE4.1, SSE4.2, Enhanced Intel SpeedStep Technology (EIST), Intel 64,

XD bit (an NX bit implementation), Intel VT-x, Smart Cache.

- (Embedded) Celeron B810E, Celeron B847E does not support XD bit(Execute Disable Bit), nor SSE4.1 and SSE4.2 instructions.
- (Embedded) Celeron B810E, Celeron B847E has support for ECC memory.
- HD Graphics (Sandy Bridge) contain 6 EUs as well as HD Graphics 2000, but does not support the following technologies:

Intel Quick Sync Video, InTru 3D, Clear Video HD, Wireless Display, and it doesn't support 3D Video.

- Transistors: 624 or 504 million
- Die size: 149 or 131 mm^{2}

Model	sSpec number	Cores	Clock rate	Turbo	L2 cache	L3 cache	GPU model	GPU frequency	TDP	Socket	I/O bus	Release date	Part number(s)	Release price (USD)
standard power
Celeron B710	SR0DS (J1); SR0EB (Q0)	1	1.6 GHz	—N/a	1 × 256 KB	1.5 MB	Intel Graphics Technology (6 EUs)	650–1000 MHz	35 W	Socket G2	DMI 2.0	June 2011	FF8062701078501; FF8062701084201	$70
Celeron B720	SR0DT (J1); SR0EA (Q0)	1	1.7 GHz	—N/a	1 × 256 KB	1.5 MB	HD Graphics (6 EUs)	650–1000 MHz	35 W	Socket G2	DMI 2.0	January 2012	FF8062701078601; FF8062701084101	$70
Celeron B730	SR0QA (Q0)	1	1.8 GHz	—N/a	1 × 256 KB	1.5 MB	HD Graphics (6 EUs)	650–1000 MHz	35 W	Socket G2	DMI 2.0	July 2012	FF8062701084002; FF8062701148002	$70
Celeron B800	SR0EW (Q0)	2	1.5 GHz	—N/a	2 × 256 KB	2 MB	HD Graphics (6 EUs)	650–1000 MHz	35 W	Socket G2	DMI 2.0	June 2011	FF8062701142600	$80
Celeron B810	SR088 (Q0)	2	1.6 GHz	—N/a	2 × 256 KB	2 MB	HD Graphics (6 EUs)	650–950 MHz	35 W	Socket G2	DMI 2.0	March 2011	FF8062700848800	$86
Celeron B815	SR0HZ (Q0)	2	1.6 GHz	—N/a	2 × 256 KB	2 MB	HD Graphics (6 EUs)	650–1050 MHz	35 W	Socket G2	DMI 2.0	January 2012	FF8062701159901	$86
Celeron B820	SR0HQ (Q0)	2	1.7 GHz	—N/a	2 × 256 KB	2 MB	HD Graphics (6 EUs)	650–1050 MHz	35 W	Socket G2	DMI 2.0	July 2012	FF8062700848602	$86
Celeron B830	SR0HR (Q0)	2	1.8 GHz	—N/a	2 × 256 KB	2 MB	HD Graphics (6 EUs)	650–1050 MHz	35 W	Socket G2	DMI 2.0	September 2012	FF8062700848702	$86
Celeron B840	SR0EN (Q0)	2	1.9 GHz	—N/a	2 × 256 KB	2 MB	HD Graphics (6 EUs)	650–1000 MHz	35 W	Socket G2	DMI 2.0	July 2011	FF8062700998301	$86
standard power, embedded
Celeron B810E	SR0BT (Q0)	2	1.6 GHz	—N/a	2 × 256 KB	2 MB	HD Graphics (6 EUs)	650–1000 MHz	35 W	BGA-1023	DMI 2.0	June 2011	AV8062700849802	OEM
low power
Celeron 787	SR0EC (J1); SR0VJ (Q0)	1	1.3 GHz	—N/a	1 × 256 KB	1.5 MB	HD Graphics (6 EUs)	350–950 MHz	17 W	BGA-1023	DMI 2.0	July 2011	AV8062701079501; AV8062701345400	$107
Celeron 797	SR0ED (J1); SR0VK (Q0)	1	1.4 GHz	—N/a	1 × 256 KB	1.5 MB	HD Graphics (6 EUs)	350–950 MHz	17 W	BGA-1023	DMI 2.0	January 2012	AV8062701079601; AV8062701345500	$107
Celeron 807	SR0EE (J1); SR0PW (J1); SR0VL (Q0)	1	1.5 GHz	—N/a	1 × 256 KB	1.5 MB	HD Graphics (6 EUs)	350–950 MHz	17 W	BGA-1023	DMI 2.0	July 2012	AV8062701079701; AV8062701079702; AV8062701345600	$70
Celeron 847	SR08N (Q0)	2	1.1 GHz	—N/a	2 × 256 KB	2 MB	HD Graphics (6 EUs)	350–800 MHz	17 W	BGA-1023	DMI 2.0	June 2011	AV8062700852800	$134
Celeron 857	SR0EZ (Q0); SR0FL (J1); SR0V2 (Q0)	2	1.2 GHz	—N/a	2 × 256 KB	2 MB	HD Graphics (6 EUs)	350–1000 MHz	17 W	BGA-1023	DMI 2.0	July 2011	AV8062701022701; AV8062701149001	$134
Celeron 867	SR0F0 (J1); SR0FK (J1); SR0V3 (Q0)	2	1.3 GHz	—N/a	2 × 256 KB	2 MB	HD Graphics (6 EUs)	350–1000 MHz	17 W	BGA-1023	DMI 2.0	January 2012	AV8062701022801; AV8062701148901; AV8062701022801	$134
Celeron 877	SR08U (Q0); SR0F8 (Q0); SR0FD (J1); SR0VB (Q0)	2	1.4 GHz	—N/a	2 × 256 KB	2 MB	HD Graphics (6 EUs)	350–1000 MHz	17 W	BGA-1023	DMI 2.0	July 2012	AV8062701085500; AV8062701085501; AV8062701148001; AV8062701085501	$86
Celeron 887	SR090 (Q0); SR0F7 (Q0); SR0FE (J1); SR0VA (Q0)	2	1.5 GHz	—N/a	2 × 256 KB	2 MB	HD Graphics (6 EUs)	350–1000 MHz	17 W	BGA-1023	DMI 2.0	September 2012	AV8062701085400; AV8062701085401; AV8062701148101; AV8062701085401	$86
low power, embedded
Celeron 827E	SR0C6 (Q0)	1	1.4 GHz	—N/a	1 × 256 KB	1.5 MB	HD Graphics (6 EUs)	350–800 MHz	17 W	BGA-1023	DMI 2.0	July 2011	AV8062701082300	OEM
Celeron 847E	SR0BU (Q0)	2	1.1 GHz	—N/a	2 × 256 KB	2 MB	HD Graphics (6 EUs)	350–800 MHz	17 W	BGA-1023	DMI 2.0	June 2011	AV8062700849902	OEM
ultra-low power, embedded
Celeron 807UE	SR0NB (Q0)	1	1 GHz	—N/a	1 × 256 KB	1 MB	HD Graphics (6 EUs)	350–800 MHz	10 W	BGA-1023	DMI 2.0	December 2011	AV8062701188200	OEM

==== "Ivy Bridge" (22 nm) ====
- All models support: MMX, SSE, SSE2, SSE3, SSSE3, SSE4.1, SSE4.2, Enhanced Intel SpeedStep Technology (EIST), Intel 64, XD bit (an NX bit implementation), Intel VT-x, Smart Cache.
- HD Graphics (Ivy Bridge) contain 6 EUs as well as HD Graphics 2500, but does not support the following technologies: Intel Quick Sync Video, InTru 3D, Clear Video HD, Wireless Display, Intel Insider.
- Embedded models have support for ECC memory.

Model	sSpec number	Cores	Clock rate	Turbo	L2 cache	L3 cache	GPU model	GPU frequency	TDP	Socket	I/O bus	Release date	Part number(s)	Release price (USD)
standard power
Celeron 1000M	SR102 (P0)	2	1.8 GHz	—N/a	2 × 256 KB	2 MB	Intel Graphics Technology (6 EUs)	650–1000 MHz	35 W	Socket G2	DMI 2.0	January 2013	AW8063801120200	$86
Celeron 1005M	SR103 (P0)	2	1.9 GHz	—N/a	2 × 256 KB	2 MB	HD Graphics (6 EUs)	650–1000 MHz	35 W	Socket G2	DMI 2.0	June 2013	AW8063801121200	$86
Celeron 1020M	SR0ZY (E1); SR13U (P0)	2	2.1 GHz	—N/a	2 × 256 KB	2 MB	HD Graphics (6 EUs)	650–1000 MHz	35 W	Socket G2	DMI 2.0	January 2013	AW8063801443700; AW8063801524200	$86
standard power, embedded
Celeron 1020E	SR10D (P0); SR0VR (P0)	2	2.2 GHz	—N/a	2 × 256 KB	2 MB	HD Graphics (6 EUs)	650–1000 MHz	35 W	Socket G2; BGA-1023	DMI 2.0	January 2013	AW8063801117700; AV8063801276200	$86
low power
Celeron 1007U	SR109 (P0)	2	1.5 GHz	—N/a	2 × 256 KB	2 MB	HD Graphics (6 EUs)	350–1000 MHz	17 W	BGA-1023	DMI 2.0	January 2013	AV8063801118700	$86
Celeron 1017U	SR10A (P0)	2	1.6 GHz	—N/a	2 × 256 KB	2 MB	HD Graphics (6 EUs)	350–1000 MHz	17 W	BGA-1023	DMI 2.0	June 2013	AV8063801130300	$86
Celeron 1037U	SR108 (P0)	2	1.8 GHz	—N/a	2 × 256 KB	2 MB	HD Graphics (6 EUs)	350–1000 MHz	17 W	BGA-1023	DMI 2.0	January 2013	AV8063801442900	$86
low power, embedded
Celeron 927UE	SR10F (P0)	1	1.5 GHz	—N/a	1 × 256 KB	1 MB	HD Graphics (6 EUs)	350–900 MHz	17 W	BGA-1023	DMI 2.0	January 2013	AV8063801129600	$107
Celeron 1047UE	SR10E (P0)	2	1.4 GHz	—N/a	2 × 256 KB	2 MB	HD Graphics (6 EUs)	350–900 MHz	17 W	BGA-1023	DMI 2.0	January 2013	AV8063801116300	$134
ultra-low power
Celeron 1019Y	SR13W (P0)	2	1 GHz	—N/a	2 × 256 KB	2 MB	HD Graphics (6 EUs)	350–800 MHz	10 W	BGA-1023	DMI 2.0	April 2013	AV8063801443502	$153

=== Haswell-based Celerons ===
==== "Haswell-MB" (22 nm) ====
- All models support: MMX, SSE, SSE2, SSE3, SSSE3, SSE4.1, SSE4.2, Enhanced Intel SpeedStep Technology (EIST), Intel 64, XD bit (an NX bit implementation), Intel VT-x, Smart Cache.
- 2970M supports Intel Quick Sync Video.

Model	sSpec number	Cores	Clock rate	Turbo	L2 cache	L3 cache	GPU model	GPU frequency	TDP	Socket	I/O bus	Release date	Part number(s)	Release price (USD)
Celeron 2950M	SR1HF (C0)	2	2 GHz	—N/a	2 × 256 KB	2 MB	Intel Graphics Technology (10 EUs)	400–1100 MHz	37 W	Socket G3	DMI 2.0	September 2013	CW8064701487007	$86
Celeron 2970M	SR1LF (C0)	2	2.2 GHz	—N/a	2 × 256 KB	2 MB	HD Graphics (10 EUs)	400–1100 MHz	37 W	Socket G3	DMI 2.0	April 2014	CW8064701487001	$75

==== "Haswell-ULT" (SiP, 22 nm) ====
- All models support: MMX, SSE, SSE2, SSE3, SSSE3, SSE4.1, SSE4.2, Enhanced Intel SpeedStep Technology (EIST), Intel 64, XD bit (an NX bit implementation), Intel VT-x, Smart Cache.
- 2957U and 2981U also support Intel Wireless Display and Intel Quick Sync Video.
- Transistors: 1.3 billion
- Die size: 181 mm^{2}

Model	sSpec number	Cores	Clock rate	Turbo	L2 cache	L3 cache	GPU model	GPU frequency	TDP	Socket	I/O bus	Release date	Part number(s)	Release price (USD)
Celeron 2955U	SR16Y (C0); SR1DU (D0)	2	1.4 GHz	—N/a	2 × 256 KB	2 MB	Intel Graphics Technology (10 EUs)	200–1000 MHz	15 W	BGA-1168	DMI 2.0	September 2013	CL8064701523900; CL8064701567500	$132
Celeron 2957U	SR1DV (D0)	2	1.4 GHz	—N/a	2 × 256 KB	2 MB	HD Graphics (10 EUs)	200–1000 MHz	15 W	BGA-1168	DMI 2.0	December 2013	CL8064701570000	$132
Celeron 2980U	SR1DM (D0)	2	1.6 GHz	—N/a	2 × 256 KB	2 MB	HD Graphics (10 EUs)	200–1000 MHz	15 W	BGA-1168	DMI 2.0	September 2013	CL8064701479801	$137
Celeron 2981U	SR1DX (D0)	2	1.6 GHz	—N/a	2 × 256 KB	2 MB	HD Graphics (10 EUs)	200–1000 MHz	15 W	BGA-1168	DMI 2.0	December 2013	CL8064701570200	$132

==== "Haswell-ULX" (SiP, 22 nm) ====
- All models support: MMX, SSE, SSE2, SSE3, SSSE3, SSE4.1, SSE4.2, Enhanced Intel SpeedStep Technology (EIST), Intel 64, XD bit (an NX bit implementation), Intel VT-x, Smart Cache.
- Transistors: 1.3 billion
- Die size: 181 mm^{2}
- GPU supports Intel Quick Sync Video.

Model	sSpec number	Cores	Clock rate	Turbo	L2 cache	L3 cache	GPU model	GPU frequency	TDP	Socket	I/O bus	Release date	Part number(s)	Release price (USD)
Celeron 2961Y	SR1DK (D0)	2	1.1 GHz	—N/a	2 × 256 KB	2 MB	Intel Graphics Technology (10 EUs)	200–850 MHz	11.5 W	BGA-1168	DMI 2.0	December 2013	CL8064701568400	

==== "Haswell-H" (22 nm) ====
- All models support: MMX, SSE, SSE2, SSE3, SSSE3, SSE4.1, SSE4.2, Enhanced Intel SpeedStep Technology (EIST), Intel 64, XD bit (an NX bit implementation), Intel VT-x, Smart Cache.
- Transistors: 1.3 billion
- Die size: 181 mm^{2}
- Embedded models support ECC memory
- GPU doesn't support Intel Quick Sync Video.

Model	sSpec number	Cores	Clock rate	Turbo	L2 cache	L3 cache	GPU model	GPU frequency	TDP	Socket	I/O bus	Release date	Part number(s)	Release price (USD)
standard power, embedded
Celeron 2000E	SR17S (C0)	2	2.2 GHz	—N/a	2 × 256 KB	2 MB	HD Graphics (10 EUs)	400–900 MHz	37 W	BGA-1364	DMI 2.0	January 2014	CL8064701528700	$86
low power, embedded
Celeron 2002E	SR17P (C0)	2	1.5 GHz	—N/a	2 × 256 KB	2 MB	HD Graphics (10 EUs)	400–900 MHz	25 W	BGA-1364	DMI 2.0	January 2014	CL8064701484102	$86

==== "Broadwell-U" (14 nm) ====
- All models support: MMX, SSE, SSE2, SSE3, SSSE3, SSE4.1, SSE4.2, Enhanced Intel SpeedStep Technology (EIST), Intel 64, XD bit (an NX bit implementation), Intel VT-x, Intel VT-d, Smart Cache, Intel Wireless Display, and configurable TDP (cTDP) down

Model	sSpec number	Cores	Clock rate	Turbo	L2 cache	L3 cache	GPU model	GPU frequency	TDP	Socket	I/O bus	Release date	Part number(s)	Release price (USD)
Celeron 3205U	SR215 (E0)	2	1.5 GHz	—N/a	2 × 256 KB	2 MB	Intel Graphics Technology (12 EUs)	100–800 MHz	15 W	BGA-1168	DMI 2.0	January 2015	FH8065801882800	$107
Celeron 3215U	SR243 (F0)	2	1.7 GHz	—N/a	2 × 256 KB	2 MB	HD Graphics (12 EUs)	300–850 MHz	15 W	BGA-1168	DMI 2.0	June 2015	FH8065801882802	$107
Celeron 3755U	SR211 (E0)	2	1.7 GHz	—N/a	2 × 256 KB	2 MB	HD Graphics (12 EUs)	100–800 MHz	15 W	BGA-1168	DMI 2.0	January 2015	FH8065801620801	$107
Celeron 3765U	SR242 (F0)	2	1.9 GHz	—N/a	2 × 256 KB	2 MB	HD Graphics (12 EUs)	300–850 MHz	15 W	BGA-1168	DMI 2.0	June 2015	FH8065801620803	$107

=== Silvermont-based Celerons ===
==== "Bay Trail-M" (22 nm) ====
- All models support: MMX, SSE, SSE2, SSE3, SSSE3, SSE4.1, SSE4.2, Enhanced Intel SpeedStep Technology (EIST), Intel 64, XD bit (an NX bit implementation), Intel VT-x.
- GPU and memory controller are integrated onto the processor die
- GPU is based on Ivy Bridge Intel HD Graphics, with 4 execution units, and supports DirectX 11, OpenGL 4.0, OpenGL ES 3.0 and OpenCL 1.1. N2807, N2808, N2830, N2840, N2930 and N2940 support Intel Quick Sync Video.
- Package size: 25 mm × 27 mm

Model	sSpec number	Cores	Clock rate	Burst	L2 cache	GPU model	GPU frequency	Memory	TDP	SDP	Socket	Release date	Part number(s)	Release price (USD)
ultra-low power
Celeron N2805	SR1LY (B2); SR1HS (B2)	2	1.46 GHz	1.5 GHz	1 MB	Intel Graphics Technology (4 EUs)	313-667 MHz	1 × DDR3L-1066	4.3 W	2.5 W	FC-BGA 1170	September 2013	FH8065301564500	$132
Celeron N2806	SR1SH (B3)	2	1.6 GHz	2 GHz	1 MB	HD Graphics (4 EUs)	313-756 MHz	1 × DDR3L-1066	4.5 W	2.5 W	FC-BGA 1170	November 2013	FH8065301616703	$132
Celeron N2807	SR1W5 (C0); SR3V8 (D1)	2	1.58 GHz	2.16 GHz	1 MB	HD Graphics (4 EUs)	313-750 MHz	1 × DDR3L-1333	4.3 W	2.5 W	FC-BGA 1170	March 2014	FH8065301730502; FH8065301730502	$107
Celeron N2808	SR1YH (C0)	2	1.58 GHz	2.25 GHz	1 MB	HD Graphics (4 EUs)	311-792 MHz	1 × DDR3L-1333	4.5 W	3 W	FC-BGA 1170	July 2014	FH8065301903500	$107
standard power
Celeron N2810	SR1LX (B2); SR1HR (B2)	2	2 GHz	—N/a	1 MB	HD Graphics (4 EUs)	313-756 MHz	2 × DDR3L-1066	7.5 W	4.5 W	FC-BGA 1170	September 2013	FH8065301564501	$132
Celeron N2815	SR1SJ (B3)	2	1.86 GHz	2.13 GHz	1 MB	HD Graphics (4 EUs)	313-756 MHz	2 × DDR3L-1066	7.5 W	4.5 W	FC-BGA 1170	November 2013	FH8065301619509	$132
Celeron N2820	SR1SG (B3)	2	2.13 GHz	2.39 GHz	1 MB	HD Graphics (4 EUs)	313-756 MHz	2 × DDR3L-1066	7.5 W	4.5 W	FC-BGA 1170	November 2014	FH8065301616603	$132
Celeron N2830	SR1W4 (C0)	2	2.16 GHz	2.41 GHz	1 MB	HD Graphics (4 EUs)	313-750 MHz	2 × DDR3L-1333	7.5 W	4.5 W	FC-BGA 1170	February 2014	FH8065301729602	$107
Celeron N2840	SR1YJ (C0)	2	2.16 GHz	2.58 GHz	1 MB	HD Graphics (4 EUs)	313-792 MHz	2 × DDR3L-1333	7.5 W	4.5 W	FC-BGA 1170	July 2014	FH8065301903600	$107
Celeron N2910	SR1LW (B2); SR1HQ (B2)	4	1.6 GHz	—N/a	2 MB	HD Graphics (4 EUs)	313-756 MHz	2 × DDR3L-1066	7.5 W	4.5 W	FC-BGA 1170	September 2013	FH8065301546402	$132
Celeron N2920	SR1SF (B3)	4	1.86 GHz	2.1 GHz	2 MB	HD Graphics (4 EUs)	313-844 MHz	2 × DDR3L-1066	7.5 W	4.5 W	FC-BGA 1170	November 2013	FH8065301616203	$132
Celeron N2930	SR1W3 (C0); SR3V7 (D1)	4	1.83 GHz	2.16 GHz	2 MB	HD Graphics (4 EUs)	313-854 MHz	2 × DDR3L-1333	7.5 W	4.5 W	FC-BGA 1170	February 2014	FH8065301729501; FH8065301729501	$107
Celeron N2940	SR1YV (C0)	4	1.83 GHz	2.25 GHz	2 MB	HD Graphics (4 EUs)	313-854 MHz	2 × DDR3L-1333	7.5 W	4.5 W	FC-BGA 1170	July 2014	FH8065301919600	$107

=== Airmont-based Celerons ===
==== "Braswell" (14 nm) ====
- All models support: MMX, SSE, SSE2, SSE3, SSSE3, SSE4.1, SSE4.2, Enhanced Intel SpeedStep Technology (EIST), Intel 64, XD bit (an NX bit implementation), Intel VT-x, AES-NI.
- GPU and memory controller are integrated onto the processor die
- GPU is based on Broadwell Intel HD Graphics, with 12 execution units, and supports DirectX 11.2, OpenGL 4.3, OpenGL ES 3.0 and OpenCL 1.2 (on Windows).
- Package size: 25 mm × 27 mm

Model	sSpec number	Cores	Clock rate	Burst	L2 cache	GPU model	GPU frequency	Memory	TDP	SDP	Socket	Release date	Part number(s)	Release price (USD)
Celeron N3000	SR29J (C0)	2	1.04 GHz	2.08 GHz	2 MB	Intel Graphics Technology (12 EUs)	320-600 MHz	2 × DDR3L-1600	4 W	3 W	FC-BGA 1170	March 2015	FH8066501715915	$107
Celeron N3010	SR2KM (D1)	2	1.04 GHz	2.24 GHz	2 MB	HD Graphics 400	320-600 MHz	2 × DDR3L-1600	4 W	3 W	FC-BGA 1170	January 2016	FH8066501715938	$107
Celeron N3050	SR29H (C0); SR2A9 (C0)	2	1.6 GHz	2.16 GHz	2 MB	HD Graphics (12 EUs)	320-600 MHz	2 × DDR3L-1600	6 W	4 W	FC-BGA 1170	March 2015	FH8066501715914; FH8066501715925	$107
Celeron N3060	SR2KN (D1); SR2ZN (D1)	2	1.6 GHz	2.48 GHz	2 MB	HD Graphics 400	320-600 MHz	2 × DDR3L-1600	6 W	4 W	FC-BGA 1170	January 2016	FH8066501715929; FH8066501715949	$107
Celeron N3150	SR29F (C0); SR2A8 (C0)	4	1.6 GHz	2.08 GHz	2 MB	HD Graphics (12 EUs)	320-640 MHz	2 × DDR3L-1600	6 W	4 W	FC-BGA 1170	March 2015	FH8066501715913; FH8066501715924	$107
Celeron N3160	SR2KP (D1)	4	1.6 GHz	2.24 GHz	2 MB	HD Graphics 400	320-640 MHz	2 × DDR3L-1600	6 W	4 W	FC-BGA 1170	January 2016	FH8066501715928	$107

=== Skylake-based Celerons ===
==== "Skylake-U" (14 nm) ====
- All models support: MMX, SSE, SSE2, SSE3, SSSE3, SSE4.1, SSE4.2, Enhanced Intel SpeedStep Technology (EIST), Intel 64, XD bit (an NX bit implementation), Intel VT-x, Intel VT-d, AES-NI, Smart Cache, Intel Wireless Display, and configurable TDP (cTDP) down

Model	sSpec number	Cores (threads)	Clock rate	Turbo	L2 cache	L3 cache	GPU model	GPU frequency	TDP	Socket	I/O bus	Release date	Part number(s)	Release price (USD)
Celeron 3855U	SR2EV (D1)	2 (2)	1.6 GHz	—N/a	2 × 256 KB	2 MB	HD Graphics 510	300–900 MHz	15 W	BGA 1356	DMI 3.0	December 2015	FJ8066201931008	$107
Celeron 3955U	SR2EW (D1)	2 (2)	2 GHz	—N/a	2 × 256 KB	2 MB	HD Graphics 510	300–900 MHz	15 W	BGA 1356	DMI 3.0	December 2015	FJ8066201931006	$107

=== Goldmont-based Celerons ===
==== "Apollo Lake" (14 nm) ====
- All models support: MMX, SSE, SSE2, SSE3, SSSE3, SSE4.1, SSE4.2, Enhanced Intel SpeedStep Technology (EIST), Intel 64, XD bit (an NX bit implementation), Intel VT-x, Intel VT-d, AES-NI.
- GPU and memory controller are integrated onto the processor die
- GPU is based on Skylake Intel HD Graphics, with 12 execution units, and supports DirectX 12, OpenGL 4.5, OpenGL ES 3.0 and OpenCL 1.2 (on Windows).
- Package size: 24 mm × 31 mm

Model	sSpec number	Cores	Clock rate	Burst	L2 cache	GPU model	GPU frequency	Memory	TDP	SDP	Socket	Release date	Part number(s)	Release price (USD)
Celeron N3350	SR2YB (B0); SR2Z7 (B1); SR36M (B1); SREKH (F1)	2	1.1 GHz	2.4 GHz	2 MB	HD Graphics 500	200-650 MHz	2 × DDR3L-1866; 2 × LPDDR4-2400	6 W	4 W	FC-BGA 1296	September 2016	FH8066802980002	$107
Celeron N3450	SR2YA (B0); SR2Z6 (B1); SR36L (B1)	4	1.1 GHz	2.2 GHz	2 MB	HD Graphics 500	200-700 MHz	2 × DDR3L-1866; 2 × LPDDR4-2400	6 W	4 W	FC-BGA 1296	September 2016	FH8066802979803	$107

=== Goldmont Plus-based Celerons ===
==== "Gemini Lake" (14 nm) ====
- All models support: MMX, SSE, SSE2, SSE3, SSSE3, SSE4.1, SSE4.2, Enhanced Intel SpeedStep Technology (EIST), Intel 64, XD bit (an NX bit implementation), Intel SGX, Intel VT-x, Intel VT-d, AES-NI.
- GPU and memory controller are integrated onto the processor die
- GPU is based on Kaby Lake Intel HD Graphics, with 12 execution units, and supports DirectX 12, OpenGL 4.5, OpenGL ES 3.0 and OpenCL 1.2 (on Windows).
- Package size: 25 mm × 24 mm

Model	sSpec number	Cores	Clock rate	Burst	L2 cache	GPU model	GPU frequency	Memory	TDP	SDP	Socket	Release date	Part number(s)	Release price (USD)
Celeron N4000	SR3S1 (B0)	2	1.1 GHz	2.6 GHz	4 MB	UHD Graphics 600	200-650 MHz	2 × LPDDR4-2400	6 W	4.8 W	FC-BGA 1090	December 2017	FH8068003067417	$107
Celeron N4100	SR3S0 (B0)	4	1.1 GHz	2.4 GHz	4 MB	UHD Graphics 600	200-700 MHz	2 × LPDDR4-2400	6 W	4.8 W	FC-BGA 1090	December 2017	FH8068003067408	$107

==== "Gemini Lake Refresh" (14 nm) ====
- All models support: MMX, SSE, SSE2, SSE3, SSSE3, SSE4.1, SSE4.2, Enhanced Intel SpeedStep Technology (EIST), Intel 64, XD bit (an NX bit implementation), Intel SGX, Intel VT-x, Intel VT-d, AES-NI.
- GPU and memory controller are integrated onto the processor die
- GPU is based on Kaby Lake Intel HD Graphics, with 12 execution units, and supports DirectX 12, OpenGL 4.5, OpenGL ES 3.0 and OpenCL 1.2 (on Windows).
- Package size: 25 mm × 24 mm

Model	sSpec number	Cores	Clock rate	Burst	L2 cache	GPU model	GPU frequency	Memory	TDP	SDP	Socket	Release date	Part number(s)	Release price (USD)
Celeron N4020	SRET0 (R0)	2	1.1 GHz	2.8 GHz	4 MB	UHD Graphics 600	200-650 MHz	2 × LPDDR4-2400	6 W	4.8 W	FC-BGA 1090	November 2019	FH8068003067426	$107
Celeron N4120	SRESZ (R0)	4	1.1 GHz	2.6 GHz	4 MB	UHD Graphics 600	200-700 MHz	2 × LPDDR4-2400	6 W	4.8 W	FC-BGA 1090	November 2019	FH8068003067400	$107
Celeron J4125	SRGZS (R0)	4	2 GHz	2.7 GHz	4 MB	UHD Graphics 600	250-750 MHz	2 × LPDDR4-2400	10 W	—N/a	FC-BGA 1090	Q4 2019	FH8068003067410	

=== Kaby Lake-based Celerons ===
==== "Kaby Lake-U" (14 nm) ====
- All models support: MMX, SSE, SSE2, SSE3, SSSE3, SSE4.1, SSE4.2, SGX, MPX, Enhanced Intel SpeedStep Technology (EIST), Intel 64, XD bit (an NX bit implementation), Intel VT-x, Intel VT-d, AES-NI, Smart Cache, and configurable TDP (cTDP) down

Model	sSpec number	Cores (threads)	Clock rate	Turbo	L2 cache	L3 cache	GPU model	GPU frequency	TDP	Socket	I/O bus	Release date	Part number(s)	Release price (USD)
Celeron 3865U	SR349 (H0)	2 (2)	1.8 GHz	—N/a	2 × 256 KB	2 MB	HD Graphics 610	300–900 MHz	15 W	BGA 1356	DMI 3.0	January 2017	FJ8067702739933	$107
Celeron 3965U	SR34A (H0)	2 (2)	2.2 GHz	—N/a	2 × 256 KB	2 MB	HD Graphics 610	300–900 MHz	15 W	BGA 1356	DMI 3.0	January 2017	FJ8067702739934	$107

==== "Kaby Lake-Y" (14 nm) ====
- All models support: MMX, SSE, SSE2, SSE3, SSSE3, SSE4.1, SSE4.2, SGX, MPX, Enhanced Intel SpeedStep Technology (EIST), Intel 64, XD bit (an NX bit implementation), Intel VT-x, Intel VT-d, AES-NI, Smart Cache, and configurable TDP (cTDP) down

Model	sSpec number	Cores (threads)	Clock rate	Turbo	L2 cache	L3 cache	GPU model	GPU frequency	TDP	Socket	I/O bus	Release date	Part number(s)	Release price (USD)
Celeron 3965Y	SR3GG (H0)	2 (2)	1.5 GHz	—N/a	2 × 256 KB	2 MB	HD Graphics 615	300–850 MHz	6 W	BGA 1515	DMI 3.0	June 2017	HE8067702740021	$107

==== "Kaby Lake Refresh" (14 nm) ====
- All models support: MMX, SSE, SSE2, SSE3, SSSE3, SSE4.1, SSE4.2, SGX, MPX, Enhanced Intel SpeedStep Technology (EIST), Intel 64, XD bit (an NX bit implementation), Intel VT-x, Intel VT-d, AES-NI, Smart Cache, and configurable TDP (cTDP) down.

Model	sSpec number	Cores (threads)	Clock rate	Turbo	L2 cache	L3 cache	GPU model	GPU frequency	TDP	Socket	I/O bus	Release date	Part number(s)	Release price (USD)
Celeron 3867U	SRESK (Y0)	2 (2)	1.8 GHz	—N/a	2 × 256 KB	2 MB	HD Graphics 610	300–900 MHz	15 W	BGA 1356	DMI 3.0	January 2019	FJ8067703283011	$107

=== Coffee Lake-based Celerons ===
==== "Whiskey Lake-U" (14 nm) ====
Model	sSpec number	Cores (threads)	Clock rate	Turbo	L2 cache	L3 cache	GPU model	GPU frequency	TDP	Socket	I/O bus	Release date	Part number(s)	Release price (USD)
ultra-low power
Celeron 4205U	SRESP (W0); SRFG2 (V0)	2 (2)	1.8 GHz	—N/a	2 × 256 KB	2 MB	UHD Graphics 610	300–900 MHz	15 W	BGA 1528	DMI 3.0	January 2019	CL8068404080803; CL8068404080807	$107
Celeron 4305U	SRFA5 (V0)	2 (2)	2.2 GHz	—N/a	2 × 256 KB	2 MB	UHD Graphics 610	300–900 MHz	15 W	BGA 1528	DMI 3.0	April 2019	CL8068404066103	$107
ultra-low power, embedded
Celeron 4305UE	SRFDZ (V0)	2 (2)	2 GHz	—N/a	2 × 256 KB	2 MB	UHD Graphics 620	300–1000 MHz	15 W	BGA 1528	DMI 3.0	June 2019	CL8068404210005	$107

=== Comet Lake-based Celerons ===
==== "Comet Lake-U" (14 nm) ====
Model	sSpec number	Cores (threads)	Clock rate	Turbo	L2 cache	L3 cache	GPU model	GPU frequency	TDP	Socket	I/O bus	Release date	Part number(s)	Release price (USD)
Celeron 5205U	SRGL3 (V0)	2 (2)	1.9 GHz	—N/a	2 × 256 KB	2 MB	UHD Graphics 610	300–900 MHz	15 W	BGA 1528	DMI 3.0	October 2019	FJ8070104307803	$107
Celeron 5305U	SRGL4 (V0)	2 (2)	2.3 GHz	—N/a	2 × 256 KB	2 MB	UHD Graphics 610	300–900 MHz	15 W	BGA 1528	DMI 3.0	May 2020	FJ8070104307903	$107

=== Tiger Lake-based Celerons ===
==== "Tiger Lake-UP3" (10 nm SuperFin) ====
- All models support: SSE4.1, SSE4.2, AVX2, FMA3, Speed Shift Technology (SST), Intel 64, Intel VT-x, Intel VT-d, AES-NI, Smart Cache, DL Boost, Optane memory, GNA 2.0, IPU6, TB4.

Model	sSpec number	Cores (threads)	Clock rate	Turbo	L2 cache	L3 cache	GPU model	GPU frequency	TDP	Memory	Release date	Part number(s)	Release price (USD)
Mobile
Celeron 6305	SRK0B (B1)	2 (2)	1.8 GHz	—N/a	2 × 1.25 MB	4 MB	UHD Graphics (48 EU)	?–1250 MHz	15 W	2× LPDDR4X-3733; 2× DDR4-3200	October 2020	FH8069004531901	$107
Embedded
Celeron 6305E	SRK17 (B1)	2 (2)	1.8 GHz	—N/a	2 × 1.25 MB	4 MB	UHD Graphics (48 EU)	?–1250 MHz	15 W	2× LPDDR4X-3733; 2× DDR4-3200	October 2020	FH8069004542700	$107

=== Tremont-based Celerons ===
==== "Jasper Lake" (10 nm) ====
- All models support: MMX, SSE, SSE2, SSE3, SSSE3, SSE4.1, SSE4.2, Enhanced Intel SpeedStep Technology (EIST), Intel 64,

XD bit (an NX bit implementation), Intel VT-x, Intel VT-d, AES-NI, Intel SHA Extensions, Intel SGX, SMAP/SMEP

- Display controller with 1 MIPI DSI 1.2 port and 3 DDI ports (eDP 1.4b, MIPI DSI 1.2, DP 1.4a, or HDMI 2.0b)
- Integrated Intel HD Graphics (Gen11) GPU
- PCI Express 3.0 controller supporting 8 lanes (multiplexed); 4 lanes available externally
- DDR4/LPDDR4 dual-channel memory controller supporting up to 16 GB
- Two USB 3.2 2x1 ports (a.k.a. USB 3.1)
- Four USB 3.2 1x1 ports (a.k.a. USB 3.0)
- Eight USB 2.0 ports
- Two SATA-600 ports
- Package size: 35 mm x 24 mm
- Integrated HD audio controller
- Integrated image signal processor supporting four cameras (three concurrent)
- Integrated memory card reader supporting SDIO 3.0 and eMMC 5.1
- Serial I/O supporting SPI, HSUART (serial port) and I2C
- Integrated CNVi with Wi-Fi 6 (802.11ax 1x1 and 2x2) and Bluetooth 5.x (using UART/I2S/USB2)

Model	sSpec number	Cores	Clock rate	Burst	L2 cache	L3 cache	GPU model	GPU frequency	Memory	TDP	Socket	Release date	Part number(s)	Release price (USD)
Celeron N4500	SRKH0 (A1)	2	1.1 GHz	2.8 GHz	1.5 MB	4 MB	UHD Graphics (16 EUs)	350-750 MHz	2× DDR4 / LPDDR4X-2933	6 W	FC-BGA 1338	January 2021	DC8069704609907	
Celeron N4505	SRKGW (A1)	2	2.0 GHz	2.9 GHz	1.5 MB	4 MB	UHD Graphics (16 EUs)	450-750 MHz	2× DDR4 / LPDDR4X-2933	10 W	FC-BGA 1338	January 2021	DC8069704609809	
Celeron N5100	SRKGZ (A1)	4	1.1 GHz	2.8 GHz	1.5 MB	4 MB	UHD Graphics (24 EUs)	350-800 MHz	2× DDR4 / LPDDR4X-2933	6 W	FC-BGA 1338	January 2021	DC8069704609906	
Celeron N5105	SRKGV (A1)	4	2.0 GHz	2.9 GHz	1.5 MB	4 MB	UHD Graphics (24 EUs)	450-800 MHz	2× DDR4 / LPDDR4X-2933	10 W	FC-BGA 1338	January 2021	DC8069704609808	

=== Alder Lake-based Celerons ===
==== "Alder Lake-U" (Intel 7) ====
- All models support: SSE4.1, SSE4.2, AVX, AVX2, FMA3, Speed Shift Technology (SST), Intel 64,

Intel VT-x, Intel VT-d, AES-NI, IPU6, TB4, Smart Cache, Thread Director, DL Boost, and GNA 3.0.

- Support 20 lanes (UP3) or 14 lanes (UP4) of PCI Express 4.0/3.0.
- All models support up to LPDDR5-5200 or LPDDR4X-4266 memory
- Standard power models also support up to DDR5-4800 or DDR4-3200 memory.

Model number	P-core (performance)			E-core (efficiency)			L3 cache	GPU model	GPU freq	Power		Socket	I/O bus	Release date	sSpec number	Part number(s)	Release price (USD)
Model number	Cores (threads)	Freq.	L2 cache	Cores (threads)	Freq.	L2 cache	L3 cache	GPU model	GPU freq	Base	Max	Socket	I/O bus	Release date	sSpec number	Part number(s)	Release price (USD)
Standard power (UP3)
Celeron 7305	1 (1)	1.1 GHz	1× 1.25 MB	4 (4)	0.9 GHz	1× 2 MB	8 MB	UHD; Graphics (48 EU)	1100 MHz	15 W	55 W	BGA 1744	DMI; 4.0 ×8	Q1 2022	SRLFX (R0)	FJ8071504 827300	$107
Low power (UP4)
Celeron 7300	1 (1)	1.0 GHz	1× 1.25 MB	4 (4)	0.7 GHz	1× 2 MB	8 MB	UHD; Graphics (48 EU)	800 MHz	9 W	29 W	BGA 1781	DMI; 4.0 ×8	Q1 2022			

== Embedded processors ==
=== Nehalem-based Celerons ===
==== Celeron (single-core) ====
===== "Jasper Forest" (45 nm) =====
- All models support: MMX, SSE, SSE2, SSE3, SSSE3, Enhanced Intel SpeedStep Technology (EIST), Intel 64, XD bit (an NX bit implementation), Intel VT-x, Intel VT-d, HyperThreading, Smart Cache, ECC memory.
- Single-Core version of Xeon C3500-Series

Model	sSpec number	Clock rate	Turbo	Cores	L2 cache	L3 cache	I/O bus	Mult.	Memory	Voltage	TDP	Socket	Release date	Part number(s)	Release price (USD)
Celeron P1053	SLBWN (B0)	1.33 GHz	—N/a	1	1 × 256 KB	2 MB	DMI	10×	3 × DDR3-800	1.0–1.5 V	30 W	LGA 1366	February 2010	AT80612004743AA	$160

=== Sandy Bridge-based Celerons ===
==== Celeron (single-core) ====
===== "Gladden" (32 nm) =====
- All models support: MMX, SSE, SSE2, SSE3, SSSE3, SSE4.1, SSE4.2, AVX, Enhanced Intel SpeedStep Technology (EIST), Intel 64, XD bit (an NX bit implementation), Intel VT-x, EPT, Hyper-threading, Smart Cache, ECC memory.
- Transistors:
- Die size:

Model	sSpec number	Cores	Clock rate	Turbo	L2 cache	L3 cache	TDP	Socket	I/O bus	Memory	Release date	Part number(s)	Release price (USD)
standard power
Celeron 725C	SR0NX (Q0)	1	1.3 GHz	—N/a	1 × 256 KB	1.5 MB	10 W	FC-BGA10	DMI 2.0	1 × DDR3-1333	Q2 2012	AV8062701147000	$74

=== Tremont-based Celerons ===
==== "Elkhart Lake" (10 nm SuperFin) ====
- All models support: MMX, SSE, SSE2, SSE3, SSSE3, SSE4.1, SSE4.2, Intel 64, XD bit (an NX bit implementation), Intel VT-x, Intel VT-d, AES-NI.
- GPU is based on Gen11 Intel HD Graphics, with up to 32 execution units, and supports up to 3 displays (4K @ 60 Hz) through HDMI, DP, eDP, or DSI.
- SoC peripherals include 4 × USB 2.0/3.0/3.1, 2 × SATA, 3 × 2.5GbE LAN, UART, and up to 8 lanes of PCI Express 3.0 in x4, x2, and x1 configurations.
- Package size: 35 mm × 24 mm

Model	sSpec number	Cores	Clock rate	Burst	L2 cache	GPU model	GPU frequency	Memory	TDP	SDP	Socket	Release date	Part number(s)	Release price (USD)
Celeron N6210	SRKUC (B1)	2	1.2 GHz	2.6 GHz	1.5 MB	UHD Graphics (16 EUs)	250–750 MHz	4 × LPDDR4X-3200; 2 × DDR4-3200	6.5 W	—N/a	BGA 1493	March 2021	DC8070304190883	$54
Celeron N6211		2	1.2 GHz	3.0 GHz	1.5 MB	UHD Graphics (16 EUs)	250–750 MHz	4 × LPDDR4X-3200; 2 × DDR4-3200	6.5 W	—N/a		Q1 2021		$54
Celeron J6412	SRKUA (B1)	4	2.0 GHz	2.6 GHz	1.5 MB	UHD Graphics (16 EUs)	400–800 MHz	4 × LPDDR4X-3733; 2 × DDR4-3200	10 W	—N/a	BGA 1493	March 2021	DC8070304190881	$54
Celeron J6413		4	1.8 GHz	3.0 GHz	1.5 MB	UHD Graphics (16 EUs)	400–800 MHz	4 × LPDDR4X-3733; 2 × DDR4-3200	10 W	—N/a		Q1 2021		$54

=== Tiger Lake-based Celerons ===
==== "Tiger Lake-H" (10 nm SuperFin) ====
- All models support: SSE4.1, SSE4.2, AVX2, AVX-512, FMA3, Speed Shift Technology (SST), Intel 64, Intel VT-x, Intel VT-d, AES-NI, Smart Cache, DL Boost, Optane memory, GNA 2.0, IPU6, TB4.

Model	sSpec number	Cores (threads)	Clock rate	Turbo	L2 cache	L3 cache	GPU model	GPU frequency	TDP	Memory	Release date	Part number(s)	Release price (USD)
Celeron 6600HE	SRKX7 (R0)	2 (2)	2.6 GHz	—N/a	2 × 1.25 MB	8 MB	UHD Graphics (16 EU)	350–1100 MHz	35 W	2× DDR4-3200	August 2021	FH8069004638144	$107

=== Alder Lake-based Celerons ===
==== "Alder Lake-U" (Intel 7) ====
- All models support: SSE4.1, SSE4.2, AVX, AVX2, FMA3, Speed Shift Technology (SST), Intel 64,

Intel VT-x, Intel VT-d, AES-NI, IPU6, TB4, Smart Cache, Thread Director, DL Boost, and GNA 3.0.

- Support 20 lanes (UP3) of PCI Express 4.0/3.0.
- All models support up to LPDDR5-5200 or LPDDR4X-4266 memory
- Standard power models also support up to DDR5-4800 or DDR4-3200 memory.

Model number	P-core (performance)		E-core (efficiency)		L3 cache	GPU model	GPU freq	Power		Socket	I/O bus	Release date	sSpec number	Part number(s)	Release price (USD)
Model number	Cores (threads)	Freq.	Cores (threads)	Freq.	L3 cache	GPU model	GPU freq	Base	Max	Socket	I/O bus	Release date	sSpec number	Part number(s)	Release price (USD)
Standard power (UP3)
Celeron 7305E	1 (1)	1.0 GHz	4 (4)	—N/a	8 MB	UHD Graphics (48 EU)	1100 MHz	15 W	—N/a	BGA 1744	DMI; 4.0 ×8	Q1 2022	SRLZL (R0)	FJ8071504827303	$107
Celeron 7305L	1 (1)	1.1 GHz	4 (4)	—	8 MB	UHD Graphics (12th Gen)	1100 MHz	15 W	28 W	FCLGA 1700		Q3 2022	SRMC6	CM8071505163800	$107

== See also ==
- Intel Celeron
- List of Intel Pentium processors
- List of Intel Core i3 processors
- List of Intel Core i5 processors
- List of Intel Core i7 processors
- List of Intel Core i9 processors
