= Intel P55 =

Intel P55 Express Platform Controller Hub (PCH)
- Codename(s): Ibex Peak
- CPU supported: Pentium G6950; Core i3 Core i5 Core i7
- Socket supported: LGA 1156
- Fabrication process: 65nm
- TDP: 4.7 W

Miscellaneous
- Release date(s): September 8, 2009
- Predecessor: ICH10 & P45 Express
- Successor: P67 and Z68

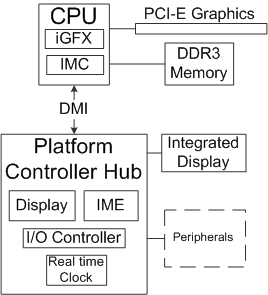
P55 Block Diagram

The Intel P55 is the first desktop chipset from Intel based on the PCH chipset design. The P55 Express chipset uses the LGA 1156 socket. Compatible CPUs include the first generation Core i series i3, i5, and i7 processor line along with a Pentium G6950. Like any PCH chipset, the P55 uses a Direct Media Interface connection.

== Features ==
- The chipset does not support onboard graphics.
- 6 SATA 3 Gbit/s ports
- 8 PCI-Express 2.0 lanes (bandwidth limited to 2.5 GT/s same as PCIe 1.0, normal PCIe 2.0 has 5 GT/s bandwidth)
- 14 USB 2.0 ports
- Integrated LAN 10/100/1000
- SMBus 2.0
- Integrated clock chip buffer
- Intel HD Audio
- Intel AC'97 Technology
- Intel Rapid Storage Technology

== See also ==
- List of Intel chipsets
- Intel 5 Series
