= Intel P45 =

Motherboard chipset made by Intel

Intel P45 Express
- Codename: Eaglelake
- CPU supported: Core 2 (Quad, Duo, Extreme); Dual-Core Pentium; Celeron (Core architecture)
- Socket supported: LGA 775
- Fabrication process: 65 nm
- TDP: 22 W
- Southbridge: ICH10

Miscellaneous
- Release date: June 5, 2008
- Predecessor: P35 (Bearlake)
- Successor: P55 Express (for Core i5 CPUs)

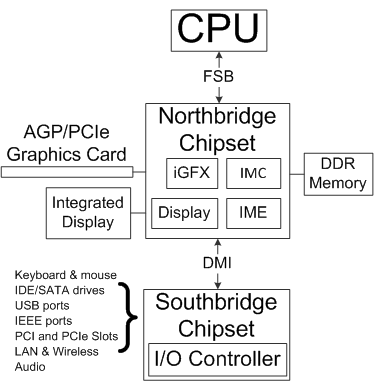
P45 Block Diagram

The P45 Express (codenamed Eaglelake) is a mainstream desktop computer chipset from Intel released in Q2 2008. The first mainboards featuring the P45 chipset were shown at CeBIT 2008.

The P45 Express chipset supports Intel's LGA 775 socket and Core 2 Duo and Quad processors. It is a 65 nm chipset, compared to the earlier generation chipsets (P35, X38, X48) which were 90 nm.

== Features ==
- 1333/1066/800 MT/s front-side bus (FSB), most motherboard manufacturers claim support up to 1600 MT/s.
- PCI Express 2.0, 1 ×16 or 2 ×8 in CrossFire configuration.
- Dual-channel DDR2 memory
  - up to 16 GiB addressable memory; officially up to 800 MHz, most motherboard manufacturers claim support up to 1200 MHz
- Dual-channel DDR3 memory
  - up to 8 GiB addressable memory; officially up 1066 MHz, most motherboard manufacturers claim support up to 1333 MHz
- ICH10 / ICH10R southbridge
- Supports 45 nm processors

== See also ==
- List of Intel chipsets
