= P67 =

P67 may refer to:

- BRM P67, an experimental Formula One car
- Intel P67, a computer chipset
- French submarine Curie (P67), also HMS Vox (P67), a submarine in service with the Free French Naval Forces and the Royal Navy
- Magdalen papyrus, a biblical manuscript
- McDonnell XP-67, an American prototype interceptor aircraft
- P67, a state regional road in Latvia
