= LGA 1156 =

Intel desktop CPU socket

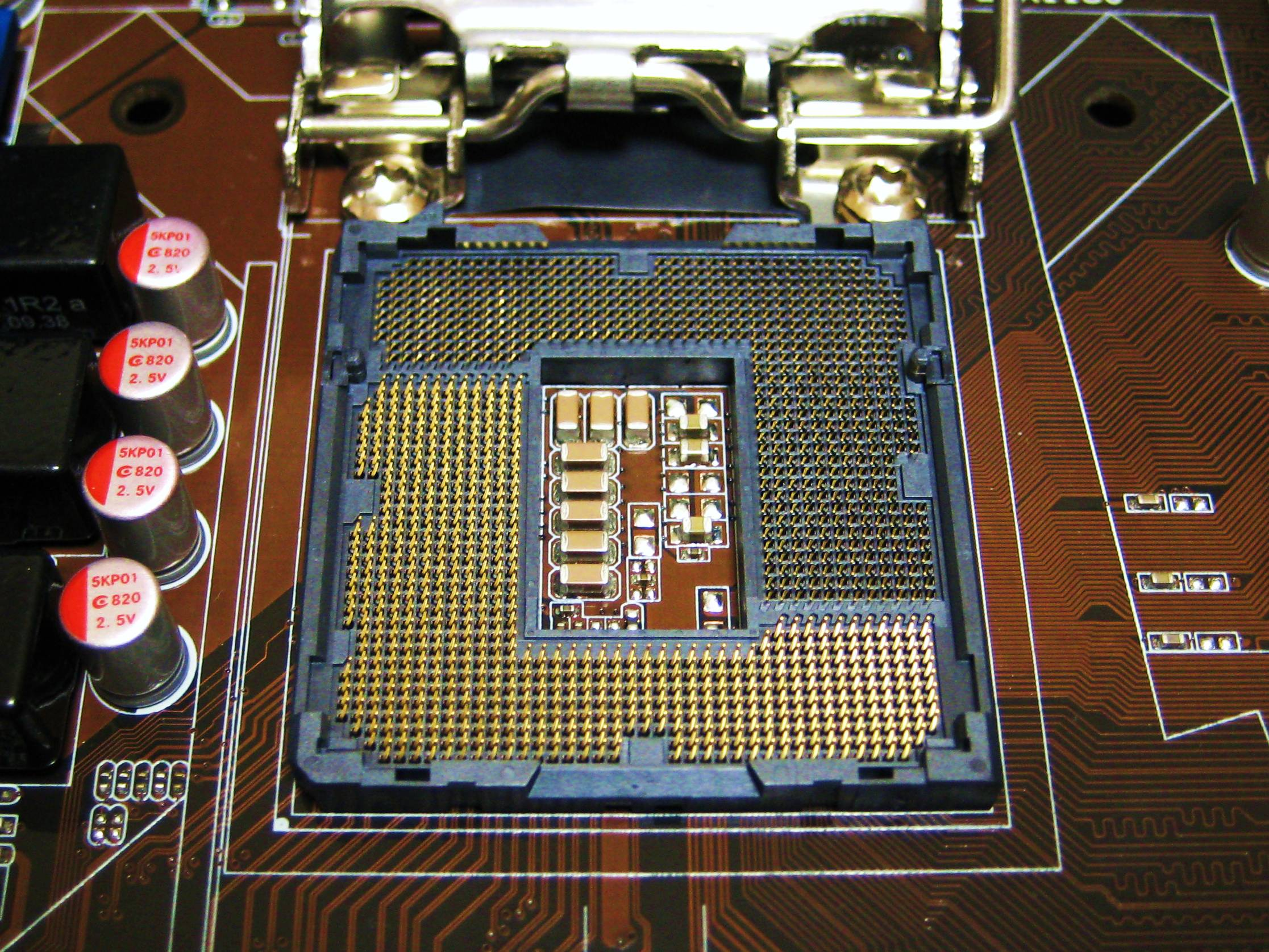
- Release date: September 2009
- Type: LGA
- Chip form factors: Flip-chip land grid array
- Contacts: 1156
- FSB protocol: PCIe 16× (video) + 4× (DMI) + 2 DP (FDI), 2 DDR3 channels
- Processor dimensions: 37.5 × 37.5 mm
- Processors: Nehalem (1.86 - 3.06 GHz); Westmere (2.00 - 3.60 GHz)
- Predecessor: LGA 775 (high-end desktops and low-end servers); LGA 771 (low- and mid-end servers)
- Successor: LGA 1155
- Memory support: DDR3
- This article is part of the CPU socket series

LGA 1156 (land grid array 1156), also known as Socket H or H1, is an Intel desktop CPU socket. The last processors supporting the LGA 1156 ceased production in 2011. It was succeeded by the mutually incompatible socket LGA 1155.

LGA 1156, along with LGA 1366, were designed to replace LGA 775. Whereas LGA 775 processors connect to a northbridge using the Front Side Bus, LGA 1156 processors integrate the features traditionally located on a northbridge within the processor itself. The LGA 1156 socket allows the following connections to be made from the processor to the rest of the system:

- PCI-Express 2.0 ×16 for communication with a graphics card. Some processors allow this connection to be divided into two ×8 lanes to connect two graphics cards. Some motherboard manufacturers use Nvidia's NF200 chip to allow even more graphics cards to be used.
- DMI for communication with the Platform Controller Hub (PCH). This consists of a PCI-Express 2.0 ×4 connection.
- FDI for communication with the PCH. This consists of two DisplayPort connections.
- Two memory channels for communication with DDR3 SDRAM. The clock speed of the memory that is supported will depend on the processor.

LGA 1156 was introduced on September 8, 2009 with the release of the Core i7-800 series, Core i5-700 series, Xeon L3426 and Xeon X3400 series, and reached EOL on December 7, 2012.

== Heatsink ==
For LGA 1156 the 4 holes for fastening the heatsink to the motherboard are placed in a square with a lateral length of 75 mm. This configuration was retained for the later, LGA 1155, LGA 1150, LGA 1151, and LGA 1200 sockets meaning that cooling solutions should generally be interchangeable.

== Supported processors ==
| μArch | Code name | Brand name | Model (list) | Frequency | Cores/threads | Max. memory speed |
|---|---|---|---|---|---|---|
| Nehalem (45 nm) | Lynnfield | Core i5 | i5-7xx | 2.66–2.8 GHz | 4/4 | DDR3-1333 |
| Nehalem (45 nm) | Lynnfield | Core i7 | i7-8xx | 2.8–3.07 GHz | 4/8 | DDR3-1333 |
| Nehalem (45 nm) | Lynnfield | Xeon | L34xx | 1.86 GHz | 4/4 or 4/8 | DDR3-1333 |
| Nehalem (45 nm) | Lynnfield | Xeon | X34xx | 2.4–3.07 GHz | 4/4 or 4/8 | DDR3-1333 |
| Westmere (32 nm) | Clarkdale | Celeron | G1xxx | 2.26 GHz | 2/2 | DDR3-1066 |
| Westmere (32 nm) | Clarkdale | Pentium | G6xxx | 2.80 GHz | 2/2 | DDR3-1066 |
| Westmere (32 nm) | Clarkdale | Core i3 | i3-5xx | 2.93–3.33 GHz | 2/4 | DDR3-1333 |
| Westmere (32 nm) | Clarkdale | Core i5 | i5-6xx | 3.2–3.6 GHz | 2/4 | DDR3-1333 |
| Westmere (32 nm) | Clarkdale | Xeon | L34xx | 2.0–2.27 GHz | 2/4 | DDR3-1066 |

All LGA 1156 processors and motherboards made to date are interoperable, making it possible to switch between a Celeron, Pentium, Core i3 or Core i5 with integrated graphics and a Core i5 or Core i7 without graphics. However, using a chip with integrated graphics on a P55 motherboard will (in addition to likely requiring a BIOS update) not allow use of the on-board graphics processor, and likewise, using a chip without integrated graphics on a H55, H57 or Q57 motherboard will not allow use of the motherboard's graphics ports.

== Supported chipsets ==
The Desktop chipsets that officially support LGA 1156 are Intel's H55, H57, P55, and Q57. Server chipsets supporting the socket are Intel's 3400, 3420 and 3450.

Some small Chinese manufacturers are producing LGA 1156 motherboards based on H61 chipset, and ASRock, for very short time, produced LGA 1156 motherboard based on P67 chipset, the P67 Transformer. It exclusively supports Lynnfield and Clarksfield processors and was discontinued after B2 revision of 6 series chipsets was recalled, not receiving a version with B3 revision of P67 chipset.

| Name | H55 | P55 | H57 | Q57 |
|---|---|---|---|---|
| Overclocking | Yes | | | No |
| Allows using built-in GPU with Intel Clear Video Technology | Yes | No | Yes | |
| Maximum USB 2.0 ports (Note: USB 3.0 is not supported by any of these chipsets. Motherboard manufacturers may use external hardware to add USB 3.0 support.) | 12 | 14 | | |
| Maximum SATA 2.0/3.0 ports | 6 | | | |
| PATA (IDE) (Note: PATA (IDE) is no longer supported in Series 5, but most motherboard manufacturers chose to include support through the addition of third-party IDE controller.) | No | | | |
| Main PCIe configuration | 1 × PCIe 2.0 ×16 | | | |
| Secondary PCIe | 6 × PCIe 2.0 ×1 | 8 × PCIe 2.0 ×1 | | |
| Conventional PCI support | Yes | | | |
| Intel Rapid Storage Technology (RAID) | ? | | | |
| Smart Response Technology | ? | | | |
| Intel VT-d, Active Management, Trusted Execution, Anti-Theft, and vPro Technology | No | | | Yes |
| Release date | Q1'10 | Q3'09 | Q1'10 | |
| Maximum TDP | 45 W | | | |
| Chipset lithography | 65,45&32 nm | | | |

== See also ==
- List of Intel microprocessors
- List of Intel Core processors
- List of Intel Pentium microprocessors
- List of Intel Celeron microprocessors
- List of Intel Xeon microprocessors
- Clarkdale (microprocessor)
- Lynnfield (microprocessor)
- LGA 775
- LGA 1366
- LGA 1155
