= Pentium =

Brand of discontinued microprocessors produced by Intel

- Final logo (2020–2023)

General information
- Launched: March 22, 1993; 33 years ago
- Discontinued: January 1, 2023; 3 years ago
- Marketed by: Intel
- Designed by: Intel
- Common manufacturer: Intel

Performance
- Max. CPU clock rate: 60 MHz to 5.3 GHz
- FSB speeds: 50 MHz to 1066 MT/s
- DMI speeds: 2 GT/s to 16 GT/s

Physical specifications
- Cores: 1-5
- Sockets: Desktop; Socket 4; Socket 5; Socket 7; Socket 8; Slot 1; Socket 370; Socket 423; Socket 478; LGA 775; LGA 1156; LGA 1155; LGA 1150; LGA 1151; LGA 1200; LGA 1700; Mobile; Socket 495; Socket 479; Socket M; Socket P; Socket G1; Socket G2; Socket G3

Architecture and classification
- Technology node: 800 nm to Intel 7
- Microarchitecture: P5; P6; NetBurst; Core; Nehalem; Westmere; Sandy Bridge; Ivy Bridge; Haswell; Broadwell; Skylake; Willow Cove; Golden Cove
- Instruction set: IA-32, x86-64
- Instructions: x86

Products, models, variants
- Brand names: Pentium/Pentium MMX; Pentium Pro; Pentium II/Pentium II MMX; Pentium III; Pentium 4/Pentium 4 Extreme Edition; Pentium D/Pentium Extreme Edition; Pentium M; Pentium Silver; Pentium Gold
- Variant: Atom, Celeron

History
- Predecessor: i486
- Successors: Core, Intel Processor

Pentium logos

1993–2003

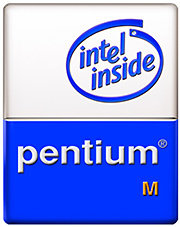
2003–2006

2006–2009

2009–2013

2013–2015

2015–2020

2020–2023

The Pentium is a discontinued series of x86 architecture-compatible microprocessors produced by Intel from 1993 to 2023. The original Pentium was Intel's fifth generation processor, succeeding the i486; Pentium was Intel's flagship processor line for over a decade until the introduction of the Intel Core line in 2006. Pentium-branded processors released from 2009 onwards were considered mid-range budget products positioned above the entry-level Atom and Celeron series, but below the faster Core lineup and workstation/server Xeon series.

The later Pentiums, which have little more than their name in common with earlier Pentiums, were based on both the architecture used in Atom and that of Core processors. In the case of Atom architectures, Pentiums were the highest performance implementations of the architecture. Pentium processors with Core architectures prior to 2017 were distinguished from the faster, higher-end i-series processors by lower clock rates and disabling some features, such as hyper-threading, virtualization and sometimes L3 cache. In 2017, the Pentium brand was split up into two separate lines using the Pentium name: Pentium Silver, aiming for low-power devices using the Atom and Celeron architectures; and Pentium Gold, aiming for entry-level desktop and using existing architectures such as Kaby Lake or Coffee Lake.

In September 2022, Intel announced that the Pentium and Celeron branding would be discontinued and replaced with the new "Intel Processor" branding for low-end processors starting on January 1, 2023.

== Overview ==
During development, Intel generally identifies processors with codenames, such as Prescott, Willamette, Coppermine, Katmai, Klamath, or Deschutes. These usually become widely known, even after the processors are given official names on launch.

The original Pentium-branded CPUs were expected to be named 586 or i586, to follow the naming convention of prior generations (286, i386, i486). However, as the firm wanted to prevent their competitors from branding their processors with similar names (as AMD had done with their Am486), Intel filed a trademark application on the name in the United States, but was denied because a series of numbers was considered to lack trademark distinctiveness. Instead, they would name their processors as "Pentium" rather than using numbers, which Andrew Grove wanted to trademark that generation processor.

Following Intel's prior series of 8086, 80186, 80286, 80386, and 80486 microprocessors, the firm's first P5-based processor was released as the original Intel Pentium on March 22, 1993. Marketing firm Lexicon Branding was hired to coin a name for the new processor. The suffix -ium was chosen as it could connote a fundamental ingredient of a computer, like a chemical element, while the prefix pent- could refer to the fifth generation of x86.

Due to its success, the Pentium brand would continue through several generations of high-end processors. In 2006, the name briefly disappeared from Intel's technology roadmaps, only to re-emerge in 2007.

In 1998, Intel introduced the Celeron brand for low-priced processors, as a replacement for the original Pentium and the 80486 brand – the latter had been the low-end option for entry-level desktops and laptops for nine years. With the 2006 introduction of the Intel Core brand as the company's new flagship line of processors, the Pentium series was to be discontinued. However, due to a demand for mid-range dual-core processors, the Pentium brand was repurposed to be Intel's mid-range processor series, between the Celeron and Core series, continuing with the Pentium Dual-Core line.

In 2009, the "Dual-Core" suffix was dropped, and new x86 processors started carrying the plain Pentium name again.

In 2014, Intel released the Pentium 20th Anniversary Edition, to mark the 20th anniversary of the Pentium brand. These processors are unlocked and highly overclockable.

A year later, the "20th Anniversary Edition" wordmark was dropped, and new x86 processors started carrying the formerly used Pentium name again.

In 2017, Intel split the Pentium branding into two line-ups. Pentium Silver targets low-power devices and shares architecture with Atom and Celeron, while Pentium Gold targets entry-level desktops and uses existing architecture, such as Kaby Lake and Coffee Lake.

In September 2022, Intel announced that the Pentium and Celeron branding would be discontinued and replaced with the new "Intel Processor" branding for low-end processors in laptops starting on January 1, 2023. This applies to desktops using Pentium and Celeron processors as well, and both brands were discontinued around the same time laptops stopped using Pentium processors in favor of "Intel Processor" branded processors on January 1, 2023.

Intel Pentium processor family
Brand	Microarchitecture	Desktop	Laptop	Server
Pentium Pentium OverDrive	P5	P5 (0.8 μm); P54C (0.6 μm); P54CS (0.35 μm)		
Pentium MMX Pentium OverDrive MMX	P5	P55C (0.35 μm); Tillamook (0.25 μm)		
Pentium Pro	P6			P6 (0.5 μm); P6 (0.35 μm)
Pentium II Pentium II Xeon Pentium II OverDrive Mobile Pentium II	P6	Klamath (0.35 μm); Deschutes (0.25 μm)	Tonga (0.25 μm); Dixon (0.25 μm); Dixon (0.18 μm)	Drake (0.25 μm)
Pentium III Pentium III Xeon Mobile Pentium III Pentium III M	P6	Katmai (0.25 μm); Coppermine (180 nm); Tualatin (130 nm)	Coppermine (180 nm); Tualatin (130 nm)	Tanner (0.25 μm); Cascades (180 nm)
Pentium 4 Pentium 4 Extreme Edition	NetBurst	Willamette (180 nm); Northwood (130 nm); Gallatin (130 nm); Prescott-2M (90 nm); Prescott (90 nm); Cedar Mill (65 nm)	Northwood (130 nm); Prescott (90 nm)	Rebranded as Xeon
Pentium D Pentium Extreme Edition	NetBurst	Smithfield (90 nm); Presler (65 nm)		Rebranded as Xeon
Pentium M	P6 based		Banias (130 nm); Dothan (90 nm)	Rebranded as Xeon
Pentium Dual-Core	P6 based		Yonah (65 nm)	Rebranded as Xeon
Pentium Dual-Core	Core	Allendale (65 nm); Wolfdale-3M (45 nm)	Merom-2M (65 nm)	Rebranded as Xeon
Pentium	Core	Wolfdale-3M (45 nm)	Penryn-3M (45 nm)	Rebranded as Xeon
Pentium	Nehalem	Clarkdale (32 nm)	Arrandale (32 nm)	Rebranded as Xeon
Pentium	Sandy Bridge	Sandy Bridge (32 nm)		Rebranded as Xeon
Pentium	Ivy Bridge	Ivy Bridge (22 nm)		Rebranded as Xeon
Pentium	Haswell	Haswell (22 nm)		Rebranded as Xeon
Pentium	Broadwell	Broadwell (14 nm)		Rebranded as Xeon
Pentium	Skylake	Skylake (14 nm)	Braswell; Goldmont	Rebranded as Xeon
Pentium	Kaby Lake	Kaby Lake (14 nm)	Goldmont Plus (Gemini Lake)	Rebranded as Xeon
Pentium	Coffee Lake	Coffee Lake (14 nm)		Rebranded as Xeon
Pentium	Comet Lake	Comet Lake (14 nm)		Rebranded as Xeon

== Pentium-branded processors ==
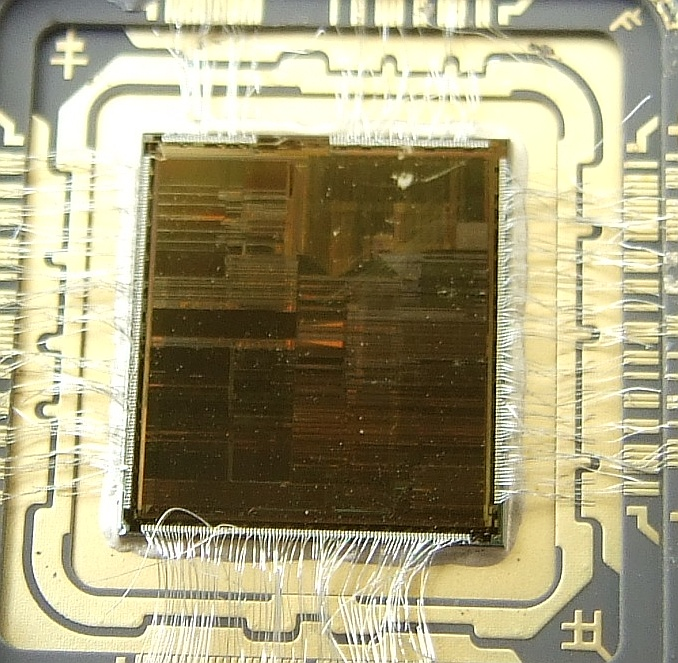
The die of a Pentium processor in its package

Intel Pentium 120 MHz die shot

=== P5 microarchitecture based ===
The original Intel P5 or Pentium and Pentium MMX processors were the superscalar follow-on to the 80486 processor and were marketed from 1993 to 1999. Some versions of these were available as Pentium OverDrive that would fit into older CPU sockets.

==== Pentium ====
Core p	Process	Clock rates	L1 cache	FSB	Socket	Release date
P5	0.8 μm	60–66 MHz	16 KB	60–66 MHz	Socket 4	March 1993
P54C	0.6 μm	75–120 MHz	16 KB	50–66 MHz	Socket 5	October 1994
P54CS	0.35 μm	133–200 MHz	16 KB	60–66 MHz	Socket 7	June 1995
P55C	0.35 μm	120–233 MHz	32 KB	60–66 MHz	Socket 7	January 1997
Tillamook	0.25 μm	166–300 MHz	32 KB	66 MHz	Socket 7	August 1997

=== P6 microarchitecture based ===
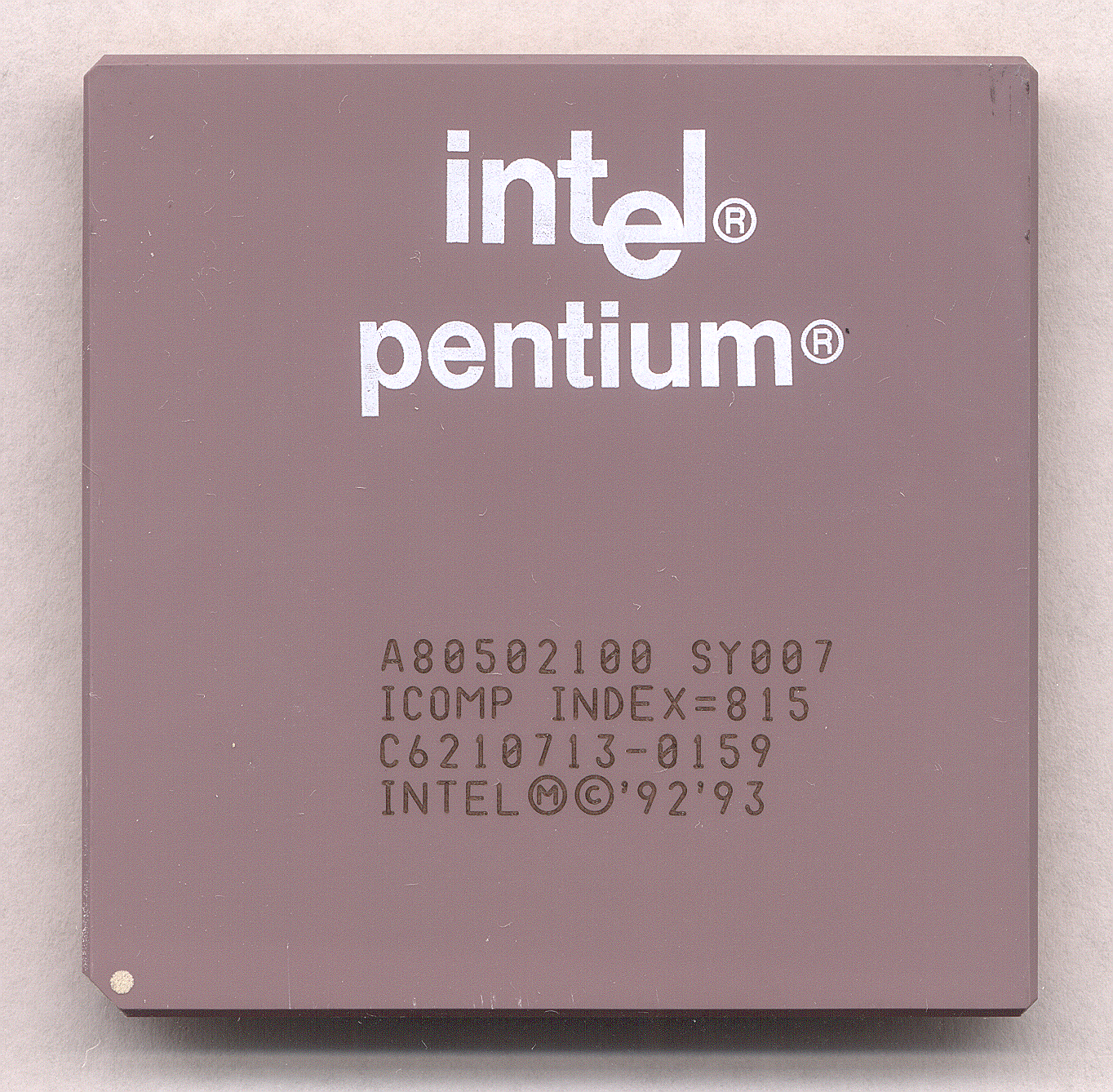
A 100 MHz Pentium (ICOMP=815) processor manufactured in 1996

In parallel with the P5 microarchitecture, Intel developed the P6 microarchitecture and started marketing it as the Pentium Pro for the high-end market in 1995. It introduced out-of-order execution and an integrated second-level cache on dual-chip processor package. The second P6 generation replaced the original P5 with the Pentium II and rebranded the high-end version as Pentium II Xeon. It was followed by a third version named the Pentium III and Pentium III Xeon respectively. The Pentium II line added the MMX instructions that were also present in the Pentium MMX.

Versions of these processors for the laptop market were initially named Mobile Pentium II and Mobile Pentium III, later versions were named Pentium III-M. Starting with the Pentium II, the Celeron brand was used for low-end versions of most Pentium processors with a reduced feature set such as a smaller cache or missing power management features.

==== Pentium Pro ====
Core	Process	Clock rates	L2 cache	FSB	Socket	Release date
P6	0.5 μm	150 MHz	256 KB	60–66 MHz	Socket 8	November 1995
P6	0.35 μm	166–200 MHz	256–1024 KB	60–66 MHz	Socket 8	

==== Pentium II ====
Core	Process	Clock rates	L2 cache	FSB	Socket	Release date
Klamath	0.35 μm	233–300 MHz	512 KB	66 MT/s	Slot 1	May 1997
Deschutes	0.25 μm	266–450 MHz	512 KB	66–100 MT/s	Slot 1	January 1998
Tonga	0.25 μm	233–300 MHz	512 KB	66 MT/s	MMC-2	April 1998
Dixon	0.25 μm	266–366 MHz	256 KB	66 MT/s	MMC-2	January 1999

==== Pentium III ====
Core	Process	Clock rates	L2 cache	FSB	Socket	Release date
Katmai	0.25 μm	450–600 MHz	512 KB	100–133 MT/s	Slot 1	February 1999
Coppermine	0.18 μm	400 MHz–1.13 GHz	256 KB	100–133 MHz	Slot 1, Socket 370, BGA2, μPGA2	October 1999
Tualatin	0.13 μm	700 MHz–1.4 GHz	512 KB	100–133 MHz	Socket 370, BGA2, μPGA2	July 2001

=== NetBurst microarchitecture based ===
In 2000, Intel introduced a new microarchitecture named NetBurst, with a much longer pipeline enabling higher clock frequencies than the P6-based processors. Initially, these were named Pentium 4, and the high-end versions have since been named simply Xeon. As with Pentium III, there are both Mobile Pentium 4 and Pentium 4 M processors for the laptop market, with Pentium 4 M denoting the more power-efficient versions. Enthusiast versions of the Pentium 4 with the highest clock rates were named Pentium 4 Extreme Edition.

The Pentium D was the first multi-core Pentium, integrating two Pentium 4 chips in one package and was available as the enthusiast Pentium Extreme Edition.

==== Pentium 4 ====
Core	Process	Clock rates	L2 cache	FSB rates	Socket	Release date
Willamette	180 nm	1.3–2.0 GHz	256 KB	400 MT/s	Socket 423, Socket 478	November 2000
Northwood	130 nm	1.6–3.4 GHz	512 KB	400 MT/s–800 MT/s	Socket 478	January 2002
Gallatin	130 nm	3.2–3.46 GHz	512 KB + 2 MB L3	800–1066 MT/s	Socket 478, LGA 775	November 2003
Prescott	90 nm	2.4–3.8 GHz	1 MB	533 MT/s–800 MT/s	Socket 478, LGA 775	February 2004
Prescott-2M	90 nm	2.8–3.8 GHz	2 MB	800–1066 MT/s	LGA 775	February 2005
Cedar Mill	65 nm	3.0–3.6 GHz	2 MB	800 MT/s	LGA 775	January 2006

==== Pentium D ====
Core	Process	Clock rates	L2 cache	FSB rates	Socket	Release date
Smithfield	90 nm	2.66–3.2 GHz	2 MB	533–800 MT/s	LGA 775	May 2005
Smithfield XE	90 nm	3.2 GHz	2 MB	800 MT/s	LGA 775	May 2005
Presler	65 nm	2.8–3.6 GHz	4 MB	800 MT/s	LGA 775	January 2006
Presler XE	65 nm	3.46–3.73 GHz	4 MB	1066 MT/s	LGA 775	January 2006

=== Pentium M microarchitecture based ===
In 2003, Intel introduced a new processor based on the P6 microarchitecture named Pentium M, which was much more power-efficient than the Mobile Pentium 4, Pentium 4 M, and Pentium III M. Dual-core versions of the Pentium M were developed under the code name Yonah and sold under the marketing names Core Duo and Pentium Dual-Core. Unlike Pentium D, it integrated both cores on one chip. From this point, the Intel Core brand name was used for the mainstream Intel processors, and the Pentium brand became a low-end version between Celeron and Core. All Pentium M based designs including Yonah are for the mobile market.

==== Pentium M ====
Core	Process	Clock rates	L1 cache	L2 cache	FSB	Socket	Release date
Banias	130 nm	0.9–1.7 GHz	64 KB	1 MB	400 MT/s	Socket 479	March 2003
Dothan	90 nm	1.00–2.26 GHz	64 KB	2 MB	400–533 MT/s	FC-uBGA	June 2004

==== Pentium Dual-Core ====
Core	Process	Clock rates	L1 cache	L2 cache	FSB rates	Socket	Release date
Yonah	65 nm	1.6–1.86 GHz	64 KB	1 MB	533 MT/s	Socket M	January 2007

=== Core microarchitecture based ===
The Pentium Dual-Core name continued to be used when the Yonah design was extended with 64-bit support, now named the Core microarchitecture. This eventually replaced all NetBurst-based processors across the four brands Celeron, Pentium, Core, and Xeon. Pentium Dual-Core processors based on the Core microarchitecture use the Allendale and Wolfdale-3M designs for desktop processors and Merom-2M for mobile processors.

==== Pentium Dual-Core ====
Pentium Dual Core logo

Core	Process	Clock rates	L1 cache	L2 cache	FSB rates	Socket	Release date
Merom-2M	65 nm	1.46–2.16 GHz	64 KB	1 MB	533–667 MT/s	Socket P	Q4 2007
Allendale	65 nm	1.6–2.4 GHz	64 KB	1 MB	800 MT/s	Socket 775	June 2007
Wolfdale-3M	45 nm	2.2–2.7 GHz	64 KB	2 MB	800 MT/s	Socket 775	August 2008

==== Pentium (2009) ====
Core	Process	Clock rates	L1 cache	L2 cache	FSB rates	Socket	Release date
Wolfdale-3M	45 nm	2.8–3.2 GHz	64 KB	2 MB	1066 MT/s	Socket 775	May 2009
Penryn-3M	45 nm	2.0–2.3 GHz	64 KB	1 MB	800 MT/s	Socket P	January 2009
Penryn-3M ULV	45 nm	1.3–1.5 GHz	64 KB	2 MB	800 MT/s	BGA 956	September 2009
Penryn-L ULV ^{1}	45 nm	1.3–1.4 GHz	64 KB	2 MB	800 MT/s	BGA 956	May 2009

Codename	Brand name	Model (list)	Cores	L2 cache	Socket	TDP
Allendale	Pentium Dual-Core	E2xxx	2	1 MB	LGA 775	65 W
Merom-2M	Mobile Pentium Dual-Core	T2xxx; T3xxx	2	1 MB	Socket P	35 W
Wolfdale-3M	Pentium Dual-Core	E2xxx	2	1 MB	LGA 775	65 W
Wolfdale-3M	Pentium Dual-Core	E5xxx	2	2 MB	LGA 775	65 W
Wolfdale-3M	Pentium	E6xxx	2	2 MB	LGA 775	65 W
Penryn-3M	Mobile Pentium	T4xxx	2	1 MB	Socket P	35 W
Penryn-3M	Mobile Pentium	SU4xxx	2	2 MB	μFC-BGA 956	10 W
Penryn-L	Mobile Pentium	SU2xxx	1	2 MB	μFC-BGA 956	5.5 W

In 2009, Intel dropped the "Dual-Core" wordmark from the name, renaming the Wolfdale-3M based processors to Pentium, and introduced new single- and dual-core processors based on Penryn under the Pentium name. They were produced and marketed until the 3rd quarter of 2011, when dual-core processors based on Westmere on the Pentium name finally replaced them.

The Penryn core is the successor to the Merom core and Intel's 45 nm version of their mobile series of Pentium processors. The FSB frequency is increased from 667 MHz to 800 MHz, and the voltage is lowered. Intel released the first Penryn Core, the Pentium T4200, in December 2008. In June 2009, Intel released the first single-core processor to use the Pentium name, a Consumer Ultra-Low Voltage (CULV) Penryn core named Pentium SU2700.

In September 2009, Intel introduced the Pentium SU4000 series together with the Celeron SU2000 and Core 2 Duo SU7000 series, which are dual-core CULV processors based on Penryn-3M and using 800 MHz FSB. The Pentium SU4000 series has 2 MB L2 cache but is otherwise basically identical to the other two lines.

=== Nehalem microarchitecture based ===
The Nehalem microarchitecture was introduced in late 2008 as a successor to the Core microarchitecture, and in early 2010, a new Pentium G6950 processor based on the Clarkdale design was introduced based on the Westmere refresh of Nehalem, which were followed by the mobile P6xxx based on Arrandale a few months later.

Core	Process	Clock rates	L2 cache	L3 cache	I/O bus	Socket	Release date
Clarkdale	32 nm	2.8–2.93 GHz	512 KB	3 MB	DMI	Socket 1156	January 2010
Arrandale	32 nm	1.2–1.86 GHz	512 KB	3 MB	DMI	Socket 988; BGA	Q2 2010

Codename	Brand name	L3 cache	Socket	TDP	Features
Clarkdale	Pentium G6xxx	3 MB	LGA 1156	73 W	Integrated GPU
Arrandale	Pentium P6xxx	3 MB	LGA 1156	35 W	Integrated GPU
Arrandale	Pentium U5xxx	3 MB	BGA	18 W	Integrated GPU

On January 7, 2010, Intel launched a new Pentium model using the Clarkdale chip in parallel with other desktop and mobile CPUs based on their new Westmere microarchitecture. Starting with this lineup, Direct Media Interface was introduced, replacing the legacy front-side bus. The first model in this series is the Pentium G6950. The Clarkdale chip is also used in the Core i3-5xx and Core i5-6xx series and features a 32 nm process (as it is based on the Westmere microarchitecture), integrated memory controller and 45 nm graphics controller and a third-level cache. In the Pentium series, some features of Clarkdale are disabled, including AES-NI, hyper-threading (versus Core i3), and the graphics controller in the Pentium runs at 533 MHz, while in the Core i3 i3-5xx series they run at 733 MHz, and Dual Video Decode that enables Blu-ray picture-in picture hardware acceleration, and support for Deep Color and xvYCC. The memory controller in the Pentium supports DDR3-1066 max, the same as the Core i3 i3-5xx series. The L3 cache is also 1 MB less than in the Core i3-5xx series.

=== Sandy Bridge microarchitecture based ===
The Sandy Bridge microarchitecture was released in the Pentium line on May 22, 2011. Hyper-threading technology was introduced on Pentiums for the first time since the Core i7 in 2008 beginning with the Pentium 3xx and in 2017 with the Kaby Lake Pentium family.

- ^{a}All models share the following details: 2 cores, 2 logical processors (4 on Pentium 3xx with hyper-threading), CPUID signature 206A7, family 6 (06h), model 42 (02Ah), stepping 7 (07h)
- ^{b}Translation lookaside buffer (TLB) and cache 64-byte prefetching; data TLB0 2-MB or 4-MB pages, 4-way associative, 32 entries; data TLB 4-KB pages, 4-way set associative, 64 entries; instruction TLB 4-KB pages, 4-way set associative, 128 entries, L2 TLB 1-MB, 4-way set associative, 64-byte line size; shared 2nd-level TLB 4 KB pages, 4-way set associative, 512 entries.
- ^{c}All models feature: on-chip floating-point unit, Enhanced Intel SpeedStep Technology (EIST), Intel 64, XD bit (an NX bit implementation), Intel VT-x, Smart Cache.
- ^{d}All models support: MMX, SSE, SSE2, SSE3, SSSE3, SSE4.1, SSE4.2
- ^{e}HD Graphics (Sandy Bridge) contain 6 EUs and HD Graphics 2000, but does not support these technologies: Intel Quick Sync Video, InTru 3D, Clear Video HD, Wireless Display, 3D Video, or 3D graphics acceleration.

Codename	Brand name^{a}	L3 cache^{b}	Socket	TDP	Features^{c},^{d}
Sandy Bridge	Pentium 3xx	3 MB	LGA 1155	15 W	hyper-threading, ECC
Sandy Bridge	Pentium 9x7	2 MB	BGA1023	17 W	Integrated GPU
Sandy Bridge	Pentium B9x0	2 MB	rPGA988B	35 W	Integrated GPU
Sandy Bridge	Pentium G6xxT	3 MB, 8-way set associative, 64 byte line size	LGA 1155	35 W	Integrated GPU^{e}
Sandy Bridge	Pentium G6xx	3 MB, 8-way set associative, 64 byte line size	LGA 1155	65 W	Integrated GPU^{e}
Sandy Bridge	Pentium G8xx	3 MB, 12-way set associative, 64 byte line size	LGA 1155	65 W	Integrated GPU^{e}
Sandy Bridge-EN	Pentium 140x	5 MB	LGA 1356	40–80 W	ECC, AVX, TXT, Intel VT-d, AES-NI

=== Ivy Bridge microarchitecture based ===
Currently, there exist Ivy Bridge models G2010, G2020, G2120, G2030, and G2130. All are dual-core and have no hyper-threading or Turbo Boost. They were the last processors that were made by Intel under the Pentium brand to fully support Windows XP and Vista.

Codename	Brand name	L3 cache	Socket	TDP	Notes
Ivy Bridge	G2010, G2020, G2030, G2120, G2130	3 MB	LGA 1155	55 W	w/o hyper-threading

=== Haswell microarchitecture based ===
Several Haswell-based Pentium processors were released in 2013, among them the G3258 "Anniversary Edition", first released in 2014 by Intel to commemorate the 20th anniversary of the line. As with prior-generation Pentium processors, Haswell and Haswell Refresh-based parts have two cores only, lack support for hyper-threading, and use the LGA1150 socket form factor.

=== Broadwell microarchitecture based ===
Broadwell-based Pentiums were launched in Q1 2015 using a 14 nm process (e.g. the dual-core 1.9 GHz Intel Pentium 3805U with 2 MB cache). They used the FCBGA1168 socket.

=== Skylake microarchitecture based ===
Skylake-based Pentium processors support up to 64 GB RAM. Features like Turbo Boost, Intel vPro, Hyper-Threading are not available. Supports AES-NI and RDRAND.

Integrated graphics are provided by Intel HD Graphics 510, utilizing a maximum of 1.7 GB of memory, for resolutions up to 4096×2304 @ 60 Hz using Display Port supporting up to 3 displays.

Skylake-based Pentium processors are the last Intel processors made under the Pentium brand on which Windows earlier than Windows 10 are officially supported by Microsoft, although enthusiast-created modifications are available that disabled the Windows Update check and allowed Windows 8.1 and earlier to continue to receive Windows Updates on this and later platforms.

=== Kaby Lake microarchitecture based ===
In Q1 2017 Intel released the Kaby Lake-based Pentium G4560; it is the first Pentium-branded CPU since the NetBurst-based Pentium 4 to support hyper-threading, a feature available in some "Core"-branded products. Features include a clock speed of 3.5 GHz with four threads, 3 MB of L3 cache and Intel HD 610 integrated graphics.

=== Coffee Lake microarchitecture based ===
All Coffee Lake Pentium processors support Hyper-threading, and integrated Intel UHD Graphics.

=== Comet Lake microarchitecture based ===
The Comet Lake family (a refinement of Skylake on 14 nm) reached Pentium first in mobile with the Pentium Gold 6405U in late 2019, and then on desktop in Q2 2020 with Pentium Gold G64xx/G65xx/G66xx for LGA 1200, followed by a small refresh (G64x5/G65x5) in early 2021.

All Comet Lake Pentium Gold processors support Hyper-threading and integrated Intel UHD Graphics.

Core	Process	Clock rates	L2 cache	L3 cache	I/O bus	Socket	Release date
Comet Lake-S	14 nm	3.4–4.3 GHz	512 KB	4 MB	DMI 3.0, 8 GT/s	LGA 1200	Q2 2020 (refresh Q1 2021)
Comet Lake-U	14 nm	2.4 GHz	512 KB	2 MB	4 GT/s	FCBGA1528	Q4 2019

Codename	Brand name	L3 cache	Socket	TDP	Features
Comet Lake-S	Pentium Gold G64xx/G65xx/G66xx	4 MB	LGA 1200	58 W	Integrated GPU (UHD 610 on G6400; UHD 630 on G6500/G6600), hyper-threading, DDR4-2666; no Turbo or AVX/AVX2
Comet Lake-S	Pentium Gold G64x5/G65x5 (refresh)	4 MB	LGA 1200	58 W	As above; minor frequency refresh
Comet Lake-S	Pentium Gold G64x0T/G65x0T/G66x0T; G6405T	4 MB	LGA 1200	35 W	Low-power T variants; integrated GPU; DDR4-2666
Comet Lake-U	Pentium Gold 6405U	2 MB	FCBGA1528	15 W	Integrated UHD Graphics for 10th Gen; hyper-threading; DDR4-2400/LPDDR3-2133; no Turbo or AVX/AVX2

== Pentium-compatible Intel processors ==
Due to its prominence, the term "Pentium-compatible" is often used to describe any x86 processor that supports the IA-32 instruction set and architecture. Even though they do not use the Pentium name, Intel also manufactures other processors based on the Pentium series for other markets. Most of these processors share the core design with one of the Pentium processor lines, usually differing in the amount of CPU cache, power efficiency or other features. The notable exception is the Atom line, which is an independent design.

- Celeron, a low-end version
- Core, the mainstream version including Core 2, Core i3, Core i5, Core i7 and Core i9, now placed above Pentium
- Xeon, a high-end version used in servers and workstations
- A100 (discontinued), an ultra-mobile version of Pentium M, succeeded by Intel Atom
- EP80579, a system-on-a-chip based on Pentium M
- Xeon Phi, a high-end version used in servers and workstations
- Intel Quark, a now-discontinued, low-power reimplementation of the Pentium architecture for use as microcontroller and in other embedded applications

== See also ==
- List of Intel Pentium processors
- Intel Inside
- Pentium FDIV bug, a well-publicized flaw in the original processor
- Performance Rating, informally termed Pentium Rating
- "It's All About the Pentiums", a song by "Weird Al" Yankovic
- Athlon, AMD's line of processors that competed with Pentium
