= Intel Core (microarchitecture) =

Processor microarchitecture

General information
- Launched: June 26, 2006; 20 years ago (Xeon); July 27, 2006; 20 years ago (Core 2)

Performance
- Max. CPU clock rate: 933 MHz to 3.5 GHz
- FSB speeds: 533 MT/s to 1600 MT/s

Physical specifications
- Transistors: 105M to 582M (65 nm) 228M to 1900M (45 nm)
- Cores: 1–4 (2-6 Xeon)
- Sockets: Socket M (μPGA 478); Socket P (μPGA 478); Socket T (LGA 775); Socket J (LGA 771); Socket 604; FCBGA (μBGA 479); FCBGA (μBGA 965)

Cache
- L1 cache: 64 KB per core
- L2 cache: 0.5 to 6 MB per two cores
- L3 cache: 8 MB to 16 MB shared (Xeon 7400)

Architecture and classification
- Technology node: 65 nm to 45 nm
- Microarchitecture: Core
- Instruction set: x86-16, IA-32, x86-64
- Extensions: MMX, SSE, SSE2, SSE3, SSSE3, SSE4.1, VT-x (some)

Products, models, variants
- Model: P6 family (Celeron, Pentium, Pentium Dual-Core, Core 2 range, Xeon)

History
- Predecessors: NetBurst; Enhanced Pentium M (P6)
- Successors: Penryn (tick) (a version of Core); Nehalem (tock)

Support status
- Unsupported

The Intel Core microarchitecture (provisionally referred to as Next Generation Micro-architecture, and developed as Merom) is a multi-core processor microarchitecture launched by Intel in mid-2006. It is a refreshed successor to the Enhanced Pentium M, the previous iteration of the P6 microarchitecture series which started in 1995 with Pentium Pro. It also replaced the NetBurst microarchitecture, which suffered from high power consumption and heat intensity due to an inefficient pipeline designed for high clock rate. In early 2004, Prescott needed very high power to reach the clocks it needed for competitive performance, making it unsuitable for the shift to dual/multi-core CPUs. On May 7, 2004, Intel confirmed the cancellation of the next NetBurst, Tejas and Jayhawk. Intel had been developing Merom, the 64-bit evolution of the Pentium M, since 2001, and decided to expand it to all market segments, replacing NetBurst in desktop computers and servers. It inherited from Pentium M the choice of a short and efficient pipeline, delivering superior performance despite not reaching the high clocks of NetBurst. (Note: NetBurst had reached 3.8 GHz in 2004. Core initially reached 3 GHz, and after moving to 45nm in Penryn would reach 3.5 GHz. Westmere, the ultimate evolution of P6, reached 3.6 GHz base and 3.86 GHz boost frequency. (Excluding the 4.4 GHz special-order Xeons.))

The first processors that used this architecture were code-named 'Merom', 'Conroe', and 'Woodcrest'; Merom is for mobile computing, Conroe is for desktop systems, and Woodcrest is for servers and workstations. While architecturally identical, the three processor lines differ in the socket used, bus speed, and power consumption. The first Core-based desktop and mobile processors were branded Core 2, later expanding to the lower-end Pentium Dual-Core, Pentium and Celeron brands; while server and workstation Core-based processors were branded Xeon.

== Features ==
The Core microarchitecture returned to lower clock rates and improved the use of both available clock cycles and power when compared with the preceding NetBurst microarchitecture of the Pentium 4 and D-branded CPUs. The Core microarchitecture provides more efficient decoding stages, execution units, caches, and buses, reducing the power consumption of Core 2-branded CPUs while increasing their processing capacity. Intel's CPUs have varied widely in power consumption according to clock rate, architecture, and semiconductor process, shown in the CPU power dissipation tables.

Like the last NetBurst CPUs, Core based processors feature multiple cores and hardware virtualization support (marketed as Intel VT-x), and Intel 64 and SSSE3. However, Core-based processors do not have the hyper-threading technology as in Pentium 4 processors.

The L1 cache of the Core microarchitecture at 64 KB L1 cache/core (32 KB L1 Data + 32 KB L1 Instruction) is as large as in Pentium M, up from 32 KB on Pentium II / III (16 KB L1 Data + 16 KB L1 Instruction). The consumer version also lacks an L3 cache as in the Gallatin core of the Pentium 4 Extreme Edition, though it is exclusively present in high-end versions of Core-based Xeons.

Processors using the follow-on Nehalem microarchitecture include hyper-threading, and consumer parts once again have an L3 cache.

== Roadmap ==
Atom (ULV)		Node name	Pentium/Core						
Microarch.	Step	Node name	Microarch.	Step					
		600 nm	P6	Pentium Pro (133 MHz)					
		500 nm	P6	Pentium Pro (150 MHz)					
		350 nm	P6	Pentium Pro (166–200 MHz)					
		350 nm	P6	Klamath					
		250 nm	P6	Deschutes					
		250 nm	P6	Katmai	NetBurst				
		180 nm	P6	Coppermine	Willamette				
		130 nm	P6	Tualatin	Northwood				
		130 nm	Pentium M (P6)	Banias	Northwood		NetBurst(HT)		NetBurst(×2)
		90 nm	Pentium M (P6)	Dothan	Prescott	⇨	Prescott‑2M	⇨	Smithfield
		90 nm	Pentium M (P6)	Dothan	~~Tejas~~	→	⇩	→	~~Cedarmill (Tejas)~~
		65 nm	Pentium M (P6)	Yonah	~~Nehalem (NetBurst)~~		Cedar Mill	⇨	Presler
		65 nm	Core	Merom	4 cores on mainstream desktop, DDR3 introduced				
Bonnell	Bonnell	45 nm	Core	Penryn					
Bonnell	Bonnell	45 nm	Nehalem	Nehalem	HT reintroduced, integrated MC, PCH; L3-cache introduced, 256 KB L2-cache/core				
Bonnell	Saltwell	32 nm	Nehalem	Westmere	Introduced GPU on same package and AES-NI				
Bonnell	Saltwell	32 nm	Sandy Bridge	Sandy Bridge	On-die ring bus, no more non-UEFI motherboards				
Silvermont	Silvermont	22 nm	Sandy Bridge	Ivy Bridge					
Silvermont	Silvermont	22 nm	Haswell	Haswell	Fully integrated voltage regulator				
Silvermont	Airmont	14 nm	Haswell	Broadwell					
Silvermont	Airmont	14 nm	Skylake	Skylake	DDR4 introduced on mainstream desktop				
Goldmont		14 nm	Skylake	Kaby Lake					
Goldmont		14 nm	Skylake	Coffee Lake	6 cores on mainstream desktop				
Goldmont		14 nm	Skylake	Amber Lake	Mobile-only				
Goldmont Plus		14 nm	Skylake	Whiskey Lake	Mobile-only				
Goldmont Plus		14 nm	Skylake	Coffee Lake Refresh	8 cores on mainstream desktop				
Goldmont Plus		14 nm	Skylake	Comet Lake	10 cores on mainstream desktop				
Goldmont Plus		14 nm	Sunny Cove	Cypress Cove (Rocket Lake)	Backported Sunny Cove microarchitecture for 14 nm				
Tremont		10 nm	Skylake	Palm Cove (Cannon Lake)	Mobile-only				
Tremont		10 nm	Sunny Cove	Sunny Cove (Ice Lake)	512 KB L2-cache/core				
Tremont		10 nm	Sunny Cove	Willow Cove (Tiger Lake)	X^{e} graphics engine				
Gracemont		Intel 7 (10 nm ESF)	Golden Cove	Golden Cove (Alder Lake)	Hybrid, DDR5, PCIe 5.0				
Gracemont		Intel 7 (10 nm ESF)	Golden Cove	Raptor Cove (Raptor Lake)					
Crestmont		Intel 4	Redwood Cove	Meteor Lake	Mobile-only; NPU, chiplet architecture				
Crestmont		Intel 3	Redwood Cove	Arrow Lake-U					
Skymont		TSMC N3B	Lion Cove	Lunar Lake	Low power mobile only (9–30 W)				
Skymont		TSMC N3B	Lion Cove	Arrow Lake					
Darkmont		Intel 18A	Cougar Cove	Panther Lake					
Arctic Wolf		Intel 18A and/or TSMC N2P	Coyote Cove	Nova Lake					

== Technology ==
Intel Core microarchitecture

While the Core microarchitecture is a major architectural revision, it is based in part on the Pentium M processor family designed by Intel Israel. The pipeline of Core/Penryn is 14 stages long – less than half of Prescott's. Penryn's successor Nehalem has a two cycles higher branch misprediction penalty than Core/Penryn. Core can ideally sustain up to 4 instructions per cycle (IPC) execution rate, compared to the 3 IPC capability of P6, Pentium M and NetBurst microarchitectures. The new architecture is a dual core design with a shared L2 cache engineered for maximum performance per watt and improved scalability.

One new technology included in the design is Macro-Ops Fusion, which combines two x86 instructions into a single micro-operation. For example, a common code sequence like a compare followed by a conditional jump would become a single micro-op. However, this technology does not work in 64-bit mode.

Core can speculatively execute loads ahead of preceding stores with unknown addresses.

Other new technologies include 1 cycle throughput (2 cycles previously) of all 128-bit SSE instructions and a new power saving design. All components will run at minimum speed, raising speed dynamically as needed (similar to AMD's Cool'n'Quiet power-saving technology, and Intel's own SpeedStep technology from earlier mobile processors). This allows the chip to produce less heat, and minimize power use.

For most Woodcrest CPUs, the front-side bus (FSB) runs at 1333 MT/s; however, this is scaled down to 1066 MT/s for lower end 1.60 and 1.86 GHz variants. The Merom mobile variant was initially targeted to run at an FSB of 667 MT/s while the second wave of Meroms, supporting 800 MT/s FSB, were released as part of the Santa Rosa platform with a different socket in May 2007. The desktop-oriented Conroe began with models having an FSB of 800 MT/s or 1066 MT/s with a 1333 MT/s line officially launched on July 22, 2007.

The power use of these processors is very low: average energy use is to be in the 1–2 watt range in ultra-low voltage variants, with thermal design powers (TDPs) of 65 watts for Conroe and most Woodcrests, 80 watts for the 3.0 GHz Woodcrest, and 40 or 35 watts for the low-voltage Woodcrest. In comparison, a 2.2 GHz AMD Opteron 875HE processor consumes 55 watts, while the energy efficient Socket AM2 line fits in the 35 watt thermal envelope (specified a different way so not directly comparable). Merom, the mobile variant, is listed at 35 watts TDP for standard versions and 5 watts TDP for ultra-low voltage (ULV) versions.

Previously, Intel announced that it would now focus on power efficiency, rather than raw performance. However, at Intel Developer Forum (IDF) in spring 2006, Intel advertised both. Some of the promised numbers were:

- 20% more performance for Merom at the same power level; compared to Core Duo
- 40% more performance for Conroe at 40% less power; compared to Pentium D
- 80% more performance for Woodcrest at 35% less power; compared to the original dual-core Xeon

== Processor cores ==
The processors of the Core microarchitecture can be categorized by number of cores, cache size, and socket; each combination of these has a unique code name and product code that is used across several brands. For instance, code name "Allendale" with product code 80557 has two cores, 2 MB L2 cache and uses the desktop socket 775, but has been marketed as Celeron, Pentium, Core 2, and Xeon, each with different sets of features enabled. Most of the mobile and desktop processors come in two variants that differ in the size of the L2 cache, but the specific amount of L2 cache in a product can also be reduced by disabling parts at production time. Tigerton dual-cores and all quad-core processors except - are multi-chip modules combining two dies. For the 65 nm processors, the same product code can be shared by processors with different dies, but the specific information about which one is used can be derived from the stepping.

	Cores	Mobile		Desktop, UP Server		CL Server	DP Server	MP Server
Single-Core 65 nm	1	Merom-L; 80537		Conroe-L; 80557				
Single-Core 45 nm	1		Penryn-L; 80585				Wolfdale-CL; 80588	
Dual-Core 65 nm	2	Merom-2M; 80537	Merom; 80537	Allendale; 80557	Conroe; 80557	Conroe-CL; 80556	Woodcrest; 80556	Tigerton; 80564
Dual-Core 45 nm	2	Penryn-3M; 80577	Penryn; 80576	Wolfdale-3M; 80571	Wolfdale; 80570	Wolfdale-CL; 80588	Wolfdale-DP; 80573	
Quad-Core 65 nm	4				Kentsfield; 80562		Clovertown; 80563	Tigerton QC; 80565
Quad-Core 45 nm	4		Penryn-QC; 80581	Yorkfield-6M; 80580	Yorkfield; 80569	Yorkfield-CL; 80584	Harpertown; 80574	Dunnington QC; 80583
Six-Core 45 nm	6							Dunnington; 80582

=== Conroe/Merom (65 nm) ===
The original Core 2 processors are based on the same dies that can be identified as CPUID Family 6 Model 15. Depending on their configuration and packaging, their code names are Conroe (LGA 775, 4 MB L2 cache), Allendale (LGA 775, 2 MB L2 cache), Merom (Socket M, 4 MB L2 cache) and Kentsfield (multi-chip module, LGA 775, 2x4MB L2 cache). Merom and Allendale processors with limited features are in Pentium Dual Core and Celeron processors, while Conroe, Allendale and Kentsfield also are sold as Xeon processors.

Additional code names for processors based on this model are Woodcrest (LGA 771, 4 MB L2 cache), Clovertown (MCM, LGA 771, 2×4MB L2 cache) and Tigerton (MCM, Socket 604, 2×4MB L2 cache), all of which are marketed only under the Xeon brand.

Processor	Brand name	Model (list)	Cores	L2 Cache	Socket	TDP
Mobile processors
Merom-2M	Mobile Core 2 Duo	U7xxx	2	2 MB	BGA479	10 W
Merom	Mobile Core 2 Duo	L7xxx	2	4 MB	BGA479	17 W
Merom; Merom-2M	Mobile Core 2 Duo	T5xxx; T7xxx	2	2–4 MB	Socket M Socket P BGA479	35 W
Merom XE	Mobile Core 2 Extreme	X7xxx	2	4 MB	Socket P	44 W
Merom	Celeron M	5x0	1	1 MB	Socket M Socket P	30 W
Merom-2M	Celeron M	5x5	1	1 MB	Socket P	31 W
Merom-2M	Celeron Dual-Core	T1xxx	2	512–1024 KB	Socket P	35 W
Merom-2M	Pentium Dual-Core	T2xxx; T3xxx	2	1 MB	Socket P	35 W
Desktop processors
Allendale	Xeon	3xxx	2	2 MB	LGA 775	65 W
Conroe	Xeon	3xxx	2	2–4 MB	LGA 775	65 W
Conroe and Allendale	Core 2 Duo	E4xxx	2	2 MB	LGA 775	65 W
Conroe and Allendale	Core 2 Duo	E6xx0	2	2–4 MB	LGA 775	65 W
Conroe-CL	Core 2 Duo	E6xx5	2	2–4 MB	LGA 771	65 W
Conroe-XE	Core 2 Extreme	X6xxx	2	4 MB	LGA 775	75 W
Allendale	Pentium Dual-Core	E2xxx	2	1 MB	LGA 775	65 W
Allendale	Celeron	E1xxx	2	512 KB	LGA 775	65 W
Kentsfield	Xeon	32xx	4	2×4 MB	LGA 775	95–105 W
Kentsfield	Core 2 Quad	Q6xxx	4	2×4 MB	LGA 775	95–105 W
Kentsfield XE	Core 2 Extreme	QX6xxx	4	2×4 MB	LGA 775	130 W
Woodcrest	Xeon	51xx	2	4 MB	LGA 771	65–80 W
Clovertown	Xeon	L53xx	4	2×4 MB	LGA 771	40–50 W
Clovertown	Xeon	E53xx	4	2×4 MB	LGA 771	80 W
Clovertown	Xeon	X53xx	4	2×4 MB	LGA 771	120–150 W
Tigerton	Xeon	E72xx	2	2×4 MB	Socket 604	80 W
Tigerton QC	Xeon	L73xx	4	2×4 MB	Socket 604	50 W
Tigerton QC	Xeon	E73xx	4	2×2–2×4 MB	Socket 604	80 W
Tigerton QC	Xeon	X73xx	4	2×4 MB	Socket 604	130 W

=== Conroe-L/Merom-L ===
The Conroe-L and Merom-L processors are based around the same core as Conroe and Merom, but only contain a single core and 1 MB of L2 cache, significantly reducing production cost and power consumption of the processor at the expense of performance compared to the dual-core version. It is used only in ultra-low voltage Core 2 Solo U2xxx and in Celeron processors and is identified as CPUID family 6 model 22.

Processor	Brand name	Model (list)	Cores	L2 Cache	Socket	TDP
Merom-L	Mobile Core 2 Solo	U2xxx	1	2 MB	BGA479	5.5 W
Merom-L	Celeron M	5x0	1	512 KB	Socket M Socket P	27 W
Merom-L	Celeron M	5x3	1	512–1024 KB	BGA479	5.5–10 W
Conroe-L	Celeron M	4x0	1	512 KB	LGA 775	35 W
Conroe-CL	Celeron M	4x5	1	512 KB	LGA 771	65 W

=== Penryn/Wolfdale (45 nm) ===
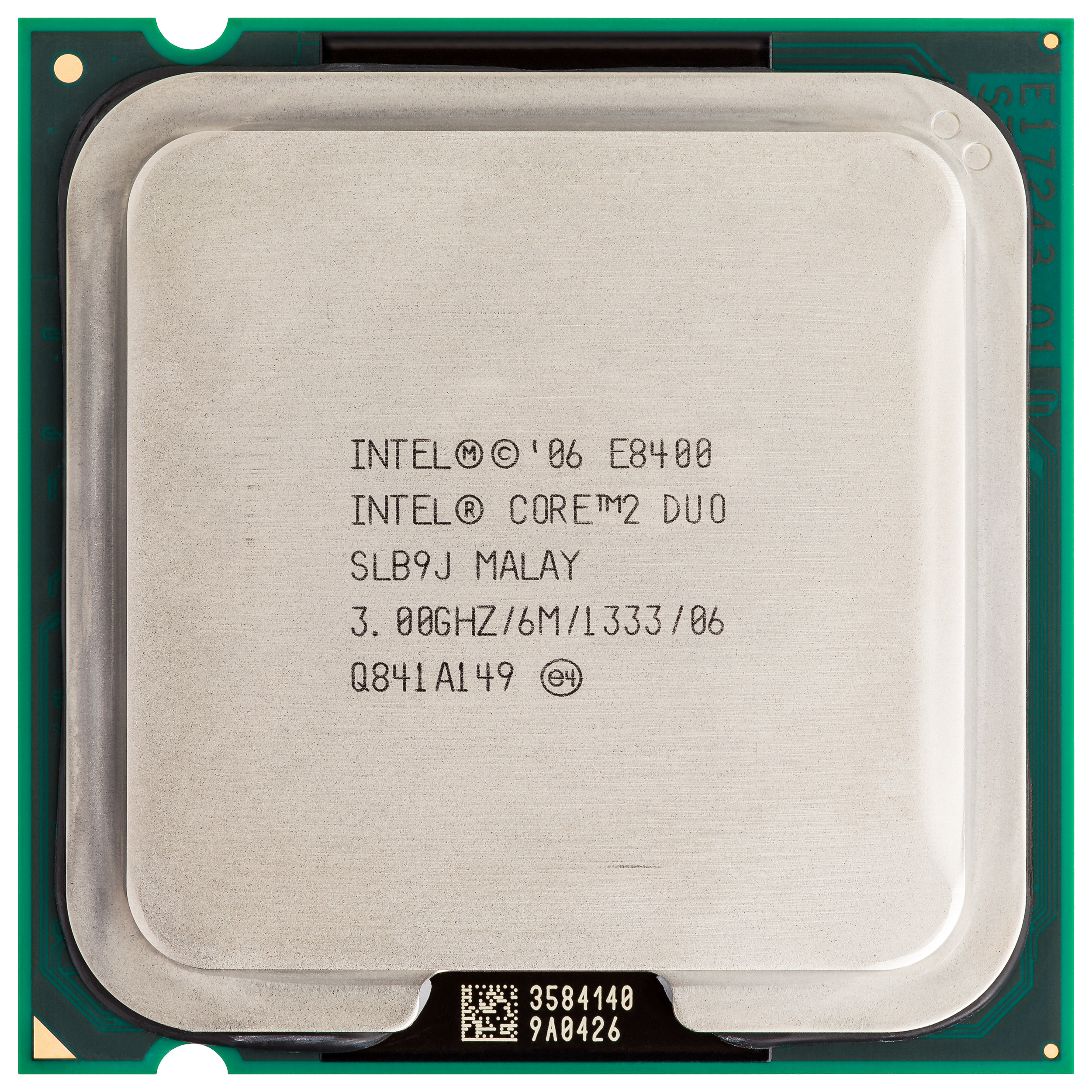
Wolfdale-type Core 2 Duo E8400 top view

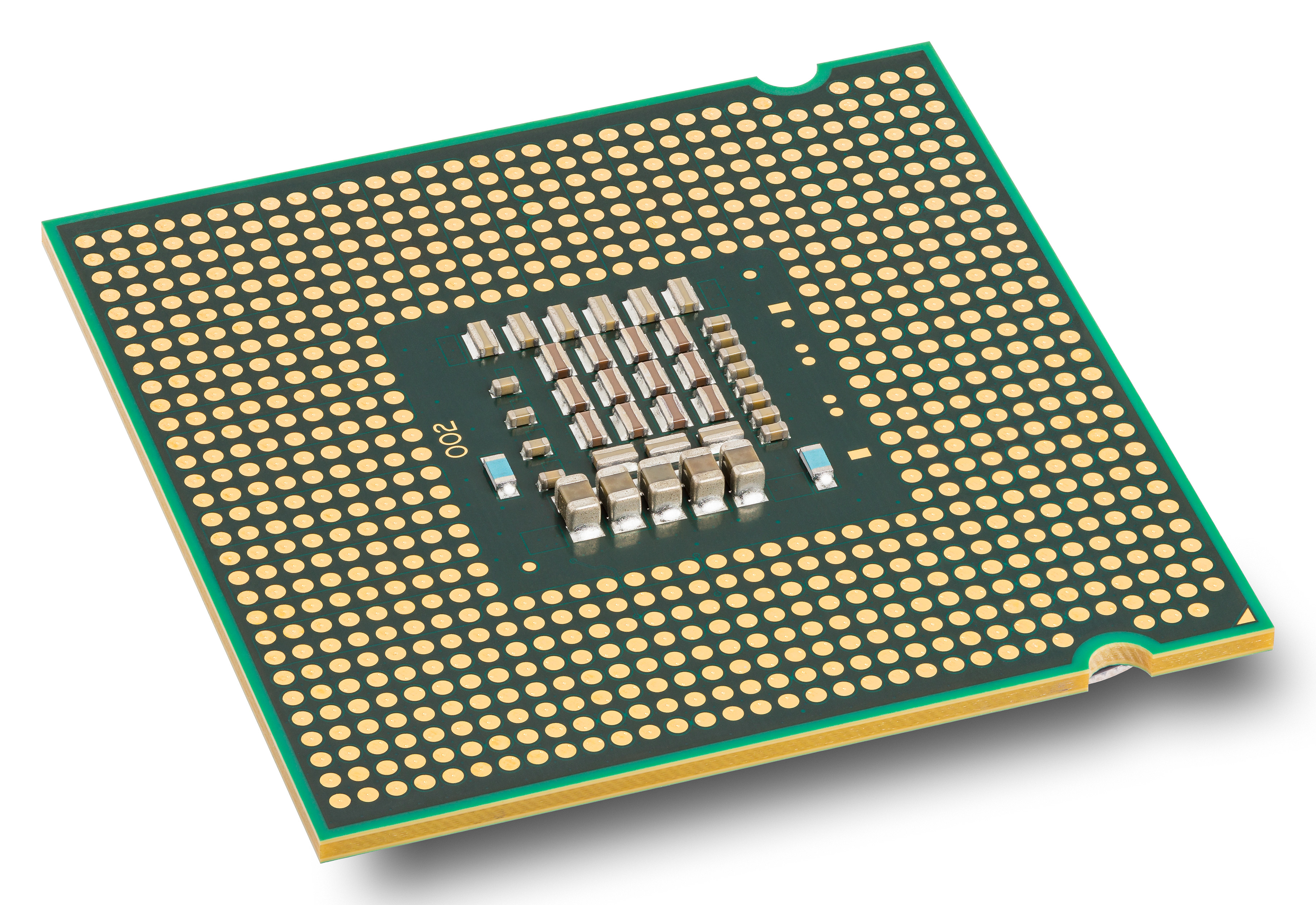
Wolfdale-type Core 2 Duo E8400 perspective view

In Intel's Tick-Tock cycle, the 2007/2008 "Tick" was the shrink of the Core microarchitecture to 45 nanometers as CPUID model 23. In Core 2 processors, it is used with the code names Penryn (Socket P), Wolfdale (LGA 775) and Yorkfield (MCM, LGA 775), some of which are also sold as Celeron, Pentium and Xeon processors. In the Xeon brand, the Wolfdale-DP and Harpertown code names are used for LGA 771 based MCMs with two or four active Wolfdale cores.

Architecturally, 45 nm Core 2 processors feature SSE4.1 and new divide/shuffle engine.

The chips come in two sizes, with 6 MB and 3 MB L2 cache. The smaller version is commonly called Penryn-3M and Wolfdale-3M and Yorkfield-6M, respectively. The single-core version of Penryn, listed as Penryn-L here, is not a separate model like Merom-L but a version of the Penryn-3M model with only one active core.

Processor	Brand name	Model (list)	Cores	L2 Cache	Socket	TDP
Mobile processors
Penryn-L	Core 2 Solo	SU3xxx	1	3 MB	BGA956	5.5 W
Penryn-3M	Core 2 Duo	SU7xxx	2	3 MB	BGA956	10 W
Penryn-3M	Core 2 Duo	SU9xxx	2	3 MB	BGA956	10 W
Penryn	Core 2 Duo	SL9xxx	2	6 MB	BGA956	17 W
Penryn	Core 2 Duo	SP9xxx	2	6 MB	BGA956	25/28 W
Penryn-3M	Core 2 Duo	P7xxx	2	3 MB	Socket P FCBGA6	25 W
Penryn-3M	Core 2 Duo	P8xxx	2	3 MB	Socket P FCBGA6	25 W
Penryn	Core 2 Duo	P9xxx	2	6 MB	Socket P FCBGA6	25 W
Penryn-3M	Core 2 Duo	T6xxx	2	2 MB	Socket P FCBGA6	35 W
Penryn-3M	Core 2 Duo	T8xxx	2	3 MB	Socket P FCBGA6	35 W
Penryn	Core 2 Duo	T9xxx	2	6 MB	Socket P FCBGA6	35 W
Penryn	Core 2 Duo	E8x35	2	6 MB	Socket P	35-55 W
Penryn-QC	Core 2 Quad	Q9xxx	4	2x3-2x6 MB	Socket P	45 W
Penryn XE	Core 2 Extreme	X9xxx	2	6 MB	Socket P	44 W
Penryn-QC	Core 2 Extreme	QX9300	4	2x6 MB	Socket P	45 W
Penryn-3M	Celeron	T3xxx	2	1 MB	Socket P	35 W
Penryn-3M	Celeron	SU2xxx	2	1 MB	μFC-BGA 956	10 W
Penryn-L	Celeron	9x0	1	1 MB	Socket P	35 W
Penryn-L	Celeron	7x3	1	1 MB	μFC-BGA 956	10 W
Penryn-3M	Pentium	T4xxx	2	1 MB	Socket P	35 W
Penryn-3M	Pentium	SU4xxx	2	2 MB	μFC-BGA 956	10 W
Penryn-L	Pentium	SU2xxx	1	2 MB	μFC-BGA 956	5.5 W
Desktop processors
Wolfdale-3M	Celeron	E3xxx	2	1 MB	LGA 775	65 W
Wolfdale-3M	Pentium	E2210	2	1 MB	LGA 775	65 W
Wolfdale-3M	Pentium	E5xxx	2	2 MB	LGA 775	65 W
Wolfdale-3M	Pentium	E6xxx	2	2 MB	LGA 775	65 W
Wolfdale-3M	Core 2 Duo	E7xxx	2	3 MB	LGA 775	65 W
Wolfdale	Core 2 Duo	E8xxx	2	6 MB	LGA 775	65 W
Wolfdale	Xeon	31x0	2	6 MB	LGA 775	45-65 W
Wolfdale-CL	Xeon	30x4	1	6 MB	LGA 771	30 W
Wolfdale-CL	Xeon	31x3	2	6 MB	LGA 771	65 W
Yorkfield	Xeon	X33x0	4	2×3–2×6 MB	LGA 775	65–95 W
Yorkfield-CL	Xeon	X33x3	4	2×3–2×6 MB	LGA 771	80 W
Yorkfield-6M	Core 2 Quad	Q8xxx	4	2×2 MB	LGA 775	65–95 W
Yorkfield-6M	Core 2 Quad	Q9x0x	4	2×3 MB	LGA 775	65–95 W
Yorkfield	Core 2 Quad	Q9x5x	4	2×6 MB	LGA 775	65–95 W
Yorkfield XE	Core 2 Extreme	QX9xxx	4	2×6 MB	LGA 775	130–136 W
Yorkfield XE	Core 2 Extreme	QX9xx5	4	2×6 MB	LGA 771	150 W
Wolfdale-DP	Xeon	E52xx	2	6 MB	LGA 771	65 W
Wolfdale-DP	Xeon	L52xx	2	6 MB	LGA 771	20-55 W
Wolfdale-DP	Xeon	X52xx	2	6 MB	LGA 771	80 W
Harpertown	Xeon	E54xx	4	2×6 MB	LGA 771	80 W
Harpertown	Xeon	L54xx	4	2×6 MB	LGA 771	40-50 W
Harpertown	Xeon	X54xx	4	2×6 MB	LGA 771	120-150 W

=== Dunnington ===
The Xeon "Dunnington" processor (CPUID Family 6, model 29) is closely related to Wolfdale but comes with six cores and an on-chip L3 cache and is designed for servers with Socket 604, so it is marketed only as Xeon, not as Core 2.

Processor	Brand name	Model (list)	Cores	L3 cache	Socket	TDP
Dunnington	Xeon	E74xx	4-6	8-16 MB	Socket 604	90 W
Dunnington	Xeon	L74xx	4-6	12 MB	Socket 604	50-65 W
Dunnington	Xeon	X7460	6	16 MB	Socket 604	130 W

== Steppings ==
The Core microarchitecture uses several stepping levels (steppings), which unlike prior microarchitectures, represent incremental improvements, and different sets of features like cache size and low power modes. Most of these steppings are used across brands, typically by disabling some features and limiting clock frequencies on low-end chips.

Steppings with a reduced cache size use a separate naming scheme, which means that the releases are no longer in alphabetic order. Added steppings have been used in internal and engineering samples, but are unlisted in the tables.

Many of the high-end Core 2 and Xeon processors use Multi-chip modules of two chips in order to get larger cache sizes or more than two cores.

=== Steppings using 65 nm process ===
						Mobile (Merom)			Desktop (Conroe)				Desktop (Kentsfield)		Server (Woodcrest, Clovertown, Tigerton)
Stepping	Released	Area	CPUID	L2 cache	Max. clock	Celeron	Pentium	Core 2	Celeron	Pentium	Core 2	Xeon	Core 2	Xeon	Xeon
B2	Jul 2006	143 mm^{2}	06F6	4 MB	2.93 GHz	M5xx		T5000 T7000 L7000			E6000 X6000	3000			5100
B3	Nov 2006	143 mm^{2}	06F7	4 MB	3.00 GHz								Q6000 QX6000	3200	5300
L2	Jan 2007	111 mm^{2}	06F2	2 MB	2.13 GHz			T5000 U7000		E2000	E4000 E6000	3000			
E1	May 2007	143 mm^{2}	06FA	4 MB	2.80 GHz	M5xx		T7000 L7000 X7000							
G0	Apr 2007	143 mm^{2}	06FB	4 MB	3.00 GHz	M5xx		T7000 L7000 X7000		E2000	E4000 E6000	3000	Q6000 QX6000	3200	5100 5300 7200 7300
G2	Mar 2009	143 mm^{2}	06FB	4 MB	2.16 GHz	M5xx		T5000 T7000 L7000							
M0	Jul 2007	111 mm^{2}	06FD	2 MB	2.40 GHz	5xx T1000	T2000 T3000	T5000 T7000 U7000	E1000	E2000	E4000				
A1	Jun 2007	81 mm^{2} (Note: 77 mm² according to Intel, 80 mm² according to Hiroshige Goto)	10661	1 MB	2.20 GHz	M5xx		U2000	220 4x0						

Early ES/QS steppings are: B0 (CPUID 6F4h), B1 (6F5h) and E0 (6F9h).

Steppings B2/B3, E1, and G0 of model 15 (cpuid 06fx) processors are evolutionary steps of the standard Merom/Conroe die with 4 MB L2 cache, with the short-lived E1 stepping only being used in mobile processors. Stepping L2 and M0 are the Allendale chips with just 2 MB L2 cache, reducing production cost and power consumption for low-end processors.

The G0 and M0 steppings improve idle power consumption in C1E state and add the C2E state in desktop processors. In mobile processors, all of which support C1 through C4 idle states, steppings E1, G0, and M0 add support for the Mobile Intel 965 Express (Santa Rosa) platform with Socket P, while the earlier B2 and L2 steppings only appear for the Socket M based Mobile Intel 945 Express (Napa refresh) platform.

The model 22 stepping A1 (cpuid 10661h) marks a significant design change, with just a single core and 1 MB L2 cache further reducing the power consumption and manufacturing cost for the low-end. Like the earlier steppings, A1 is not used with the Mobile Intel 965 Express platform.

Steppings G0, M0 and A1 mostly replaced all older steppings in 2008. In 2009, a new stepping G2 was introduced to replace the original stepping B2.

=== Steppings using 45 nm process ===
						Mobile (Penryn)			Desktop (Wolfdale)				Desktop (Yorkfield)		Server (Wolfdale-DP, Harpertown, Dunnington)
Stepping	Released	Area	CPUID	L2 cache	Max. clock	Celeron	Pentium	Core 2	Celeron	Pentium	Core 2	Xeon	Core 2	Xeon	Xeon
C0	Nov 2007	107 mm^{2}	10676	6 MB	3.00 GHz			E8000 P7000 T8000 T9000 P9000 SP9000 SL9000 X9000			E8000	3100	QX9000		5200 5400
M0	Mar 2008	82 mm^{2}	10676	3 MB	2.40 GHz	7xx		SU3000 P7000 P8000 T8000 SU9000		E5000 E2000	E7000				
C1	Mar 2008	107 mm^{2}	10677	6 MB	3.20 GHz								Q9000 QX9000	3300	
M1	Mar 2008	82 mm^{2}	10677	3 MB	2.50 GHz								Q8000 Q9000	3300	
E0	Aug 2008	107 mm^{2}	1067A	6 MB	3.33 GHz			T9000 P9000 SP9000 SL9000 Q9000 QX9000			E8000	3100	Q9000 Q9000S QX9000	3300	5200 5400
R0	Aug 2008	82 mm^{2}	1067A	3 MB	2.93 GHz	7xx 900 SU2000 T3000	T4000SU2000 SU4000	SU3000 T6000 SU7000 P8000 SU9000	E3000	E5000 E6000	E7000		Q8000 Q8000S Q9000 Q9000S	3300	
A1	Sep 2008	503 mm^{2}	106D1	3 MB	2.67 GHz										7400

In the model 23 (cpuid 01067xh), Intel started marketing stepping with full (6 MB) and reduced (3 MB) L2 cache at the same time, and giving them identical cpuid values. All steppings have the new SSE4.1 instructions. Stepping C1/M1 was a bug fix version of C0/M0 specifically for quad core processors and only used in those. Stepping E0/R0 adds two new instructions (XSAVE/XRSTOR) and replaces all earlier steppings.

In mobile processors, stepping C0/M0 is only used in the Intel Mobile 965 Express (Santa Rosa refresh) platform, whereas stepping E0/R0 supports the later Intel Mobile 4 Express (Montevina) platform.

Model 30 stepping A1 (cpuid 106d1h) adds an L3 cache and six instead of the usual two cores, which leads to an unusually large die size of 503 mm^{2}. As of February 2008, it has only found its way into the very high-end Xeon 7400 series (Dunnington).

== System requirements ==
=== Motherboard compatibility ===
Conroe, Conroe XE and Allendale all use Socket LGA 775; however, not every motherboard is compatible with these processors.

Supporting chipsets are:

- Intel: 865G/PE/P, 945G/GZ/GC/P/PL, 965G/P, 975X, P/G/Q965, Q963, 946GZ/PL, P3x, G3x, Q3x, X38, X48, P4x, 5400 Express (See also: List of Intel chipsets)
- Nvidia: nForce4 Ultra/SLI X16 for Intel, nForce 570/590 SLI for Intel, nForce 650i Ultra/650i SLI/680i LT SLI/680i SLI and nForce 750i SLI/780i SLI/790i SLI/790i Ultra SLI.
- VIA: P4M800, P4M800PRO, P4M890, P4M900, PT880 Pro/Ultra, PT890. (See also: List of VIA chipsets)
- SiS: 662, 671, 671fx, 672, 672fx
- ATI: Radeon Xpress 200 and CrossFire Xpress 3200 for Intel

The Yorkfield XE model QX9770 (45 nm with 1600 MT/s FSB) has limited chipset compatibility - with only X38, P35 (with overclocking) and some high-performance X48 and P45 motherboards being compatible. BIOS updates were gradually being released to provide support for the Penryn technology, and the QX9775 is only compatible with the Intel D5400XS motherboard. The Wolfdale-3M model E7200 also has limited compatibility (at least the Xpress 200 chipset is incompatible).

Although a motherboard may have the required chipset to support Conroe, some motherboards based on the above-mentioned chipsets do not support Conroe. This is because all Conroe-based processors require a new power delivery feature set specified in Voltage Regulator-Down (VRD) 11.0. This requirement is a result of Conroe's significantly lower power consumption, compared to the Pentium 4/D CPUs it replaced. A motherboard that has both a supporting chipset and VRD 11 supports Conroe processors, but even then some boards will need an updated BIOS to recognize Conroe's FID (Frequency ID) and VID (Voltage ID).

=== Synchronous memory modules ===
Unlike the prior Pentium 4 and Pentium D design, the Core 2 technology sees a greater benefit from memory running synchronously with the front-side bus (FSB). This means that for the Conroe CPUs with FSB of 1066 MT/s, the ideal memory performance for DDR2 is PC2-8500. In a few configurations, using PC2-5300 instead of PC2-4200 can actually decrease performance. Only when going to PC2-6400 is there a significant performance increase. While DDR2 memory models with tighter timing specifications do improve performance, the difference in real world games and applications is often negligible.

Optimally, the memory bandwidth afforded should match the bandwidth of the FSB, that is to say that a CPU with a 533 MT/s rated bus speed should be paired with RAM matching the same rated speed, for example DDR2 533, or PC2-4200. A common myth is that installing interleaved RAM will offer double the bandwidth. However, at most the increase in bandwidth by installing interleaved RAM is roughly 5–10%. The AGTL+ PSB used by all NetBurst processors and current and medium-term (pre-QuickPath) Core 2 processors provide a 64-bit data path. Current chipsets provide for a couple of either DDR2 or DDR3 channels.

Matched processor and RAM ratings
Processor model	Front-side bus	Matched memory and maximum bandwidth single channel, dual channel		
Processor model	Front-side bus	DDR	DDR2	DDR3
Mobile: T5200, T5300, U2n00, U7n00	533 MT/s	PC-3200 (DDR-400); 3.2 GB/s	PC2-4200 (DDR2-533); 4.264 GB/s; PC2-8500 (DDR2-1066); 8.532 GB/s	PC3-8500 (DDR3-1066); 8.530 GB/s
Desktop: E6n00, E6n20, X6n00, E7n00, Q6n00 and QX6n00; Mobile: T9400, T9550, T9600, P7350, P7450, P8400, P8600, P8700, P9500, P9600, SP9300, SP9400, X9100	1066 MT/s	PC-3200 (DDR-400); 3.2 GB/s	PC2-4200 (DDR2-533); 4.264 GB/s; PC2-8500 (DDR2-1066); 8.532 GB/s	PC3-8500 (DDR3-1066); 8.530 GB/s
Mobile: T5n00, T5n50, T7n00 (Socket M), L7200, L7400	667 MT/s	PC-3200 (DDR-400); 3.2 GB/s	PC2-5300 (DDR2-667); 5.336 GB/s	PC3-10600 (DDR3-1333); 10.670 GB/s
Desktop: E6n40, E6n50, E8nn0, Q9nn0, QX6n50, QX9650	1333 MT/s	PC-3200 (DDR-400); 3.2 GB/s	PC2-5300 (DDR2-667); 5.336 GB/s	PC3-10600 (DDR3-1333); 10.670 GB/s
Mobile: T5n70, T6400, T7n00 (Socket P), L7300, L7500, X7n00, T8n00, T9300, T9500, X9000; Desktop: E4n00, Pentium E2nn0, Pentium E5nn0, Celeron 4n0, E3n00	800 MT/s	PC-3200 (DDR-400); 3.2 GB/s; PC-3200 (DDR-400); 3.2 GB/s	PC2-6400 (DDR2-800); 6.400 GB/s; PC2-8500 (DDR2-1066); 8.532 GB/s	PC3-6400 (DDR3-800); 6.400 GB/s; PC3-12800 (DDR3-1600); 12.800 GB/s
Desktop: QX9770, QX9775	1600 MT/s	PC-3200 (DDR-400); 3.2 GB/s; PC-3200 (DDR-400); 3.2 GB/s	PC2-6400 (DDR2-800); 6.400 GB/s; PC2-8500 (DDR2-1066); 8.532 GB/s	PC3-6400 (DDR3-800); 6.400 GB/s; PC3-12800 (DDR3-1600); 12.800 GB/s

On jobs requiring large amounts of memory access, the quad-core Core 2 processors can benefit significantly from using PC2-8500 memory, which runs at the same speed as the CPU's FSB; this is not an officially supported configuration, but several motherboards support it.

The Core 2 processor does not require the use of DDR2. While the Intel 975X and P965 chipsets require this memory, some motherboards and chipsets support both Core 2 processors and DDR memory. When using DDR memory, performance may be reduced because of the lower available memory bandwidth.

== Chip errata ==
The Core 2 memory management unit (MMU) in X6800, E6000 and E4000 processors does not operate to prior specifications implemented in prior generations of x86 hardware. This may cause problems, many of them serious security and stability issues, with extant operating system software. Intel's documentation states that their programming manuals will be updated "in the coming months" with information on recommended methods of managing the translation lookaside buffer (TLB) for Core 2 to avoid issues, and admits that, "in rare instances, improper TLB invalidation may result in unpredictable system behavior, such as hangs or incorrect data."

Among the issues stated:

- Non-execute bit is shared across the cores.
- Floating point instruction non-coherencies.
- Allowed memory corruptions outside of the range of permitted writing for a process by running common instruction sequences.

Intel errata Ax39, Ax43, Ax65, Ax79, Ax90, Ax99 are said to be particularly serious. 39, 43, 79, which can cause unpredictable behavior or system hang, have been fixed in recent steppings.

Among those who have stated the errata to be particularly serious are OpenBSD's Theo de Raadt and DragonFly BSD's Matthew Dillon. Taking a contrasting view was Linus Torvalds, calling the TLB issue "totally insignificant", adding, "The biggest problem is that Intel should just have documented the TLB behavior better."

Microsoft has issued update KB936357 to address the errata by microcode update, with no performance penalty. BIOS updates are also available to fix the issue.

== See also ==
- x86
- List of Intel CPU microarchitectures
