= Tejas and Jayhawk =

Code names for canceled Intel microprocessors

Tejas was a code name for Intel's microprocessor, which was to be a successor to the latest Pentium 4 with the Prescott core and was sometimes referred to as Pentium V. Jayhawk was a code name for its Xeon counterpart. The cancellation of the processors in May 2004 underscored Intel's historical transition of its focus on single-core processors to multi-core processors.

== History ==
In early 2003, Intel showed Tejas and a plan to release it sometime in 2004 with possible delays into 2005. Its development however, was cancelled on May 7, 2004. Analysts attribute these issues to heat and power consumption problems due to Intel's goal of reaching ever higher clock speeds, at the detriment of work done per clock (and therefore performance per clock). This was already the case with Prescott and its mediocre performance increase over Northwood despite higher clock speeds, not to mention heavy competition from AMD with their Athlon 64. Prescott was supposed to attain >5 GHz speeds with ease, yet this was not possible due to physical limitations such as heat generated and power consumed at ambient temperatures (the "power wall"). Tejas went even further ahead with this paradigm, with Intel targeting 10 GHz clock speeds by 2011 trying to fulfill the prediction made by Andrew Grove in his keynote speech at the 1996 COMDEX/Fall. Soon enough it was clear this represented a dead end.

This cancellation reflected Intel's intention to focus on dual-core chips for the Itanium platform. With respect to desktop processors, Intel's development efforts shifted to the Pentium M microarchitecture (itself a derivative of the P6 microarchitecture last used in the Pentium III) used in the Centrino notebook platform, which offered greatly improved performance per watt compared to Prescott and other NetBurst designs. The result of modernizing the P6 microarchitecture was the Core processor line, and later the Core 2 line, offering Intel's first native dual core products for desktops and laptops while regaining the performance crown back from AMD.

This defined the end for the NetBurst architecture, with Core setting the foundation and path for power efficient architectures that followed along the Tick–tock model. Although NetBurst was a dead end for the company, its concepts were later reused and repurposed in Sandy Bridge.

To bridge the gap left by Tejas' cancellation in the x86 market, Intel did one last revision to NetBurst, codenamed Cedar Mill (single core) and Presler (dual core).

== Design and microarchitecture ==
Tejas and Jayhawk were to make several improvements on the Pentium 4's NetBurst microarchitecture. Tejas was originally to be built on a 90 nm process, later moving to a 65 nm process. The 90 nm version of the processor was reported to have 1 MB L2 cache, while the 65 nm chip would increase the cache to 2 MB. There was also to be a dual core version of Tejas called Cedarmill (or Cedar Mill depending on the source). This Cedarmill should not be confused with the 65 nm Cedar Mill-based Pentium 4, which appears to be what the codename was recycled for.

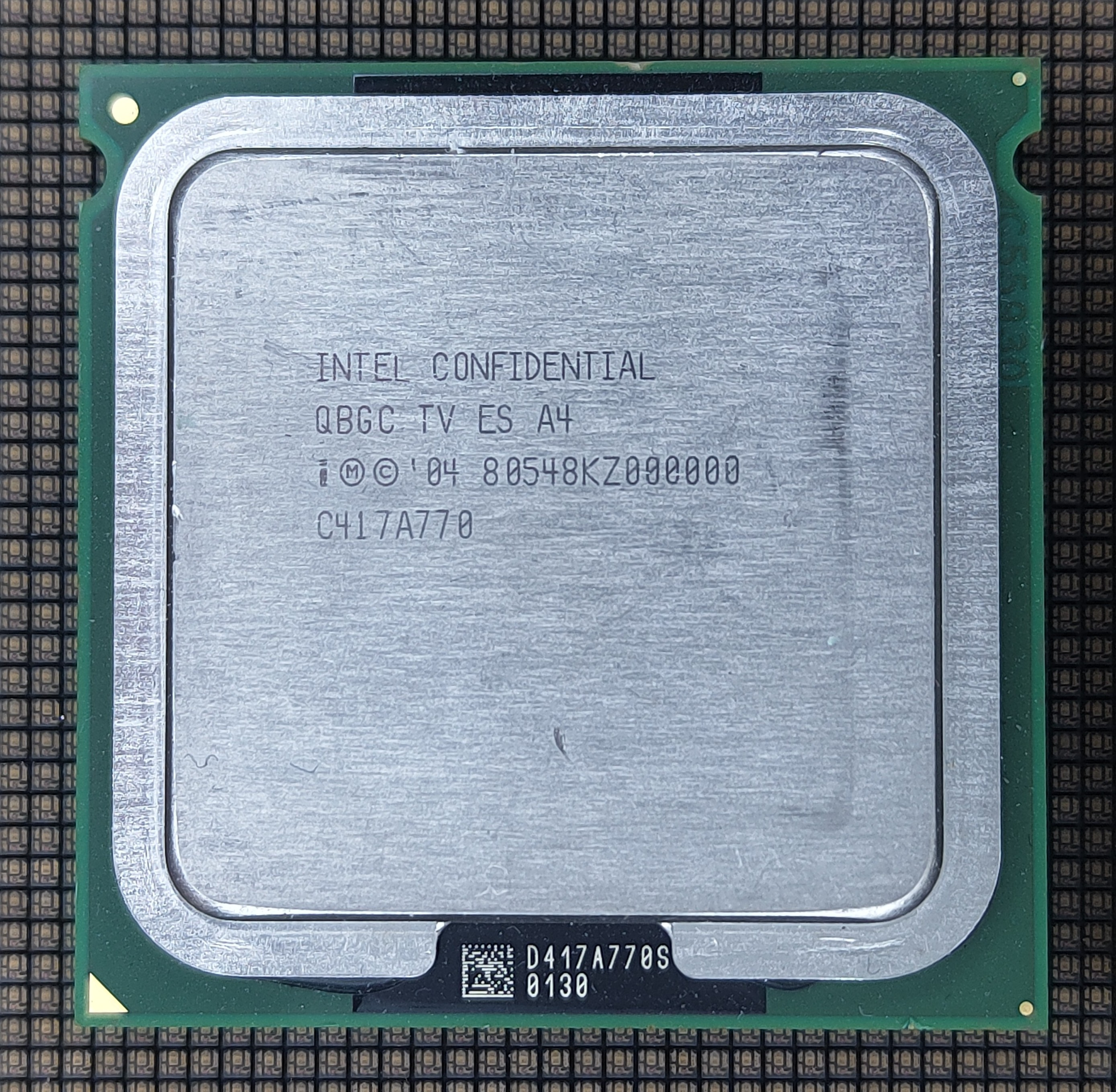
A thermal sample of an Intel Jayhawk CPU, with the Sspec QBGC

The trace cache capacity would likely have been increased, and the number of pipeline stages was increased to between 40 and 50 stages. There would have been an improved version of Hyper-Threading, as well as a new version of SSE, which was later backported to the Intel Core 2 series and named SSSE3. Tejas was slated to operate at frequencies of 7 GHz or higher. However, it's likely that Tejas wouldn't have had linear performance scaling, as it would on average have executed fewer instructions per clock cycle due to more pipeline bubbles from branch mispredicts and data cache misses. Also, it would have run hotter as well with a TDP much higher than the Prescott core of Pentium 4. The CPU was cancelled late in its development after it had reached its tapeout phase.

Initial claims reported early samples of single core 90 nm Tejas running at 2.8 GHz and rated for 150 W TDP on the LGA 775 socket, a notable increase over single core 90 nm Prescott (Pentium 4 521, 2.8 GHz, 84 W TDP) and higher than 90 nm dual core Smithfield (Pentium D 820, 2.8 GHz, 95 W TDP). In contrast, 65 nm dual core Core 2 Duo processors had a maximum of 65 W TDP (E6850, 3.00 GHz) while being much more efficient with markedly higher performance per clock.

However, the existence of engineering samples have been challenged and no source indicates that tape-out of Tejas ever existed - the sample shown in the AnandTech article being a Prescott B0 ES. Most probably only thermal samples of Tejas were produced.

== See also ==
- Mac transition to Intel processors

Atom (ULV)		Node name	Pentium/Core						
Microarch.	Step	Node name	Microarch.	Step					
		600 nm	P6	Pentium Pro (133 MHz)					
		500 nm	P6	Pentium Pro (150 MHz)					
		350 nm	P6	Pentium Pro (166–200 MHz)					
		350 nm	P6	Klamath					
		250 nm	P6	Deschutes					
		250 nm	P6	Katmai	NetBurst				
		180 nm	P6	Coppermine	Willamette				
		130 nm	P6	Tualatin	Northwood				
		130 nm	Pentium M	Banias	Northwood		NetBurst(HT)		NetBurst(×2)
		90 nm	Pentium M	Dothan	Prescott	⇨	Prescott‑2M	⇨	Smithfield
		90 nm	Pentium M	Dothan	~~Tejas~~	→	⇩	→	~~Cedarmill (Tejas)~~
		65 nm	Pentium M	Yonah	~~Nehalem (NetBurst)~~		Cedar Mill	⇨	Presler
		65 nm	Core	Merom	4 cores on mainstream desktop, DDR3 introduced				
Bonnell	Bonnell	45 nm	Core	Penryn					
Bonnell	Bonnell	45 nm	Nehalem	Nehalem	HT reintroduced, integrated MC, PCH; L3-cache introduced, 256 KB L2-cache/core				
Bonnell	Saltwell	32 nm	Nehalem	Westmere	Introduced GPU on same package and AES-NI				
Bonnell	Saltwell	32 nm	Sandy Bridge	Sandy Bridge	On-die ring bus, no more non-UEFI motherboards				
Silvermont	Silvermont	22 nm	Sandy Bridge	Ivy Bridge					
Silvermont	Silvermont	22 nm	Haswell	Haswell	Fully integrated voltage regulator				
Silvermont	Airmont	14 nm	Haswell	Broadwell					
Silvermont	Airmont	14 nm	Skylake	Skylake	DDR4 introduced on mainstream desktop				
Goldmont		14 nm	Skylake	Kaby Lake					
Goldmont		14 nm	Skylake	Coffee Lake	6 cores on mainstream desktop				
Goldmont		14 nm	Skylake	Amber Lake	Mobile-only				
Goldmont Plus		14 nm	Skylake	Whiskey Lake	Mobile-only				
Goldmont Plus		14 nm	Skylake	Coffee Lake Refresh	8 cores on mainstream desktop				
Goldmont Plus		14 nm	Skylake	Comet Lake	10 cores on mainstream desktop				
Goldmont Plus		14 nm	Sunny Cove	Cypress Cove (Rocket Lake)	Backported Sunny Cove microarchitecture for 14 nm				
Tremont		10 nm	Skylake	Palm Cove (Cannon Lake)	Mobile-only				
Tremont		10 nm	Sunny Cove	Sunny Cove (Ice Lake)	512 KB L2-cache/core				
Tremont		10 nm	Sunny Cove	Willow Cove (Tiger Lake)	X^{e} graphics engine				
Gracemont		Intel 7 (10 nm ESF)	Golden Cove	Golden Cove (Alder Lake)	Hybrid, DDR5, PCIe 5.0				
Gracemont		Intel 7 (10 nm ESF)	Golden Cove	Raptor Cove (Raptor Lake)					
Crestmont		Intel 4	Redwood Cove	Meteor Lake	Mobile-only; NPU, chiplet architecture				
Crestmont		Intel 3	Redwood Cove	Arrow Lake-U					
Skymont		TSMC N3B	Lion Cove	Lunar Lake	Low power mobile only (9–30 W)				
Skymont		TSMC N3B	Lion Cove	Arrow Lake					
Darkmont		Intel 18A	Cougar Cove	Panther Lake					
Arctic Wolf		Intel 18A and/or TSMC N2P	Coyote Cove	Nova Lake					
