= I786 =

i786 may refer to:

- NetBurst, post 6th-generation Intel microarchitecture (P68)
- Athlon, 7th-generation AMD microarchitecture
- The SSE2 instruction set, as found in NetBurst and Athlon 64 and later processors
