= List of Intel Pentium D processors =

This is a list of Intel Pentium D processors, based on the NetBurst architecture and targeted at the consumer market. Two generations were released, using the Smithfield and Presler cores and branded as 8xx- and 9xx-series respectively, as well as Pentium Extreme Edition 840, 955, and 965.

== Dual-core desktop processors ==
=== Pentium D ===
==== "Smithfield" (90 nm) ====
- All models support: MMX, SSE, SSE2, SSE3, Intel 64, XD bit (an NX bit implementation)
- Enhanced Intel SpeedStep Technology (EIST) supported by: 830, 840
- Steppings: A0, B0
- Package size: 37.5 mm × 37.5 mm
- Die size: 206 mm^{2}

Model number	sSpec number	Frequency	L2 cache	FSB speed	Multiplier	Voltage	TDP	Socket	Release date	Part number(s)	Release price (USD)
Pentium D 805	SL8ZH (B0)	2.66 GHz	2 × 1 MB	533 MT/s	20×	1.2–1.4 V	95 W	LGA 775	December, 2005	HH80551PE0672MN	$143
Pentium D 820	SL88T (A0); SL8CP (B0)	2.8 GHz	2 × 1 MB	800 MT/s	14×	1.2–1.4 V	95 W	LGA 775	May 26, 2005	HH80551PG0722MN	$241
Pentium D 830	SL88S (A0); SL8CN (B0)	3 GHz	2 × 1 MB	800 MT/s	15×	1.2–1.4 V	130 W	LGA 775	May 26, 2005	HH80551PG0802MN	$316
Pentium D 840	SL88R (A0); SL8CM (B0)	3.2 GHz	2 × 1 MB	800 MT/s	16×	1.2–1.4 V	130 W	LGA 775	May 26, 2005	HH80551PG0882MN	$530

==== "Presler" (MCP, 65 nm) ====
- All models support: MMX, SSE, SSE2, SSE3, Intel 64, XD bit (an NX bit implementation)
- Enhanced Intel SpeedStep Technology (EIST) supported by: C1 & D0 steppings
- Intel VT-x supported by: models 9x0
- Steppings: B1, C1, D0
- Package size: 37.5 mm × 37.5 mm
- Die size: 2 × 81 mm^{2}

Model number	sSpec number	Frequency	L2 cache	FSB speed	Multiplier	Voltage	TDP	Socket	Release date	Part number(s)	Release price (USD)
Pentium D 915	SL9DA (C1); SL9KB (D0)	2.8 GHz	2 × 2 MB	800 MT/s	14×	1.2–1.3375 V	95 W	LGA 775	July 23, 2006	HH80553PG0724MN	$133
Pentium D 920	SL8WS (B1); SL94S (B1)	2.8 GHz	2 × 2 MB	800 MT/s	14×	1.2–1.3375 V	95 W	LGA 775	January 16, 2006	HH80553PG0724M	$241
Pentium D 925	SL9D9 (C1); SL9KA (D0)	3.0 GHz	2 × 2 MB	800 MT/s	15×	1.2–1.3375 V	95 W	LGA 775	October, 2006	HH80553PG0804MN	$133
Pentium D 930	SL94R (B1); SL95X (C1)	3.0 GHz	2 × 2 MB	800 MT/s	15×	1.2–1.3375 V	95 W	LGA 775	January 16, 2006	HH80553PG0804M	$316
Pentium D 935	SL9QR (D0)	3.2 GHz	2 × 2 MB	800 MT/s	16×	1.2–1.3375 V	95 W	LGA 775	January, 2007	HH80553PG0884MN	$133
Pentium D 940	SL94Q (B1)	3.2 GHz	2 × 2 MB	800 MT/s	16×	1.2–1.3375 V	130 W	LGA 775	January 16, 2006	HH80553PG0824M	$423
Pentium D 940	SL95W (C1)	3.2 GHz	2 × 2 MB	800 MT/s	16×	1.2–1.3375 V	95 W	LGA 775	January 16, 2006	HH80553PG0824M	$423
Pentium D 945	SL9QB (C1); SL9QQ (D0)	3.4 GHz	2 × 2 MB	800 MT/s	17×	1.2–1.3375 V	95 W	LGA 775	July 23, 2006	HH80553PG0964MN	$163
Pentium D 950	SL94P (B1)	3.4 GHz	2 × 2 MB	800 MT/s	17×	1.2–1.3375 V	130 W	LGA 775	January 16, 2006	HH80553PG0964M	$637
Pentium D 950	SL95V (C1); SL9K8 (D0)	3.4 GHz	2 × 2 MB	800 MT/s	17×	1.2–1.3375 V	95 W	LGA 775	January 16, 2006	HH80553PG0964M	$637
Pentium D 960	SL9AP (C1)	3.6 GHz	2 × 2 MB	800 MT/s	18×	1.2–1.3375 V	130 W	LGA 775	May 2, 2006	HH80553PG1044M	$530
Pentium D 960	SL9K7 (D0)	3.6 GHz	2 × 2 MB	800 MT/s	18×	1.2–1.3375 V	95 W	LGA 775	May 2, 2006	HH80553PG1044M	$530

=== Pentium Extreme Edition ===
==== "Smithfield" (90 nm) ====
- All models support: MMX, SSE, SSE2, SSE3, Hyper-Threading, Enhanced Intel SpeedStep Technology (EIST), Intel 64, XD bit (an NX bit implementation)
- Stepping: A0
- Package size: 37.5 mm × 37.5 mm
- Die size: 206 mm^{2}

Model number	sSpec number	Frequency	L2 cache	FSB speed	Multiplier	Voltage	TDP	Socket	Release date	Part number(s)	Release price (USD)
Pentium Extreme Edition 840	SL8FK (A0)	3.2 GHz	2 × 1 MB	800 MT/s	16×	1.2–1.4 V	130 W	LGA 775	April 18, 2005	HH80551PG0882MM	$999

==== "Presler" (MCP, 65 nm) ====
- All models support: MMX, SSE, SSE2, SSE3, Hyper-Threading, Enhanced Intel SpeedStep Technology (EIST), Intel 64, XD bit (an NX bit implementation), Intel VT-x
- Steppings: B1, C1
- Package size: 37.5 mm × 37.5 mm
- Die size: 2 × 81 mm^{2}

Model number	sSpec number	Frequency	L2 cache	FSB speed	Multiplier	Voltage	TDP	Socket	Release date	Part number(s)	Release price (USD)
Pentium Extreme Edition 955	SL94N (B1); SL8WM (B1)	3.46 GHz	2 × 2 MB	1066 MT/s	13×	1.2–1.3375 V	130 W	LGA 775	January 16, 2006	HH80553PH0994M	$999
Pentium Extreme Edition 965	SL9AN (C1)	3.73 GHz	2 × 2 MB	1066 MT/s	14×	1.2–1.3375 V	130 W	LGA 775	March 22, 2006	HH80553PH1094M	$999

== See also ==
- List of Intel Pentium processors
- Pentium 4
- Pentium D
- Pentium Extreme Edition
