= NetBurst =

Intel processor microarchitecture

General information
- Launched: November 20, 2000; 25 years ago

Performance
- Max. CPU clock rate: 1.3 GHz to 3.8 GHz
- FSB speeds: 100 MT/s to 1066 MT/s

Physical specifications
- Transistors: 42M 180 nm (B2, C1, D0, E0); 55M 130 nm (B0, C1, D1, M0); 125M 90 nm (C0, D0, E0, G1); 169M 90 nm (M0, N0, R0); 230M 90 nm (A0, B0); 188M 65 nm (B1, C1, D0); 376M 65 nm (B1, C1, D0); 328M 65 nm (B0)
- Cores: 1-2 (2-4 threads with hyper-threading)
- Sockets: Socket 423; Socket 478; Socket 603; Socket 604; LGA 771; LGA 775

Cache
- L1 cache: 8 KB to 16 KB per core
- L2 cache: 128 KB to 4096 KB
- L3 cache: 4 MB to 16 MB shared

Architecture and classification
- Microarchitecture: NetBurst
- Instruction set: x86-16, IA-32, x86-64 (some)
- Extensions: MMX, SSE, SSE2, SSE3 (some)

Products, models, variants
- Models: Celeron; Celeron D; Pentium 4; Pentium D; Xeon

History
- Predecessor: P6
- Successors: Pentium M (P6); Intel Core; IA-64

The NetBurst microarchitecture, called P68 inside Intel, was the successor to the P6 microarchitecture in the x86 family of central processing units (CPUs) made by Intel. The first CPU to use this architecture was the Willamette-core Pentium 4, released on November 20, 2000, and the first of the Pentium 4 CPUs; all subsequent Pentium 4 and Pentium D variants have also been based on NetBurst. In mid-2001, Intel released the Foster core, which was also based on NetBurst, thus switching the Xeon CPUs to the new architecture as well. Pentium 4-based Celeron CPUs also use the NetBurst architecture. It was discontinued in 2010 and replaced with the Core microarchitecture based on P6, released in July 2006.

== Technology ==
The NetBurst microarchitecture includes features such as Hyper-threading, Hyper Pipelined Technology, Rapid Execution Engine, Execution Trace Cache, and replay system which all were introduced for the first time in this particular microarchitecture, and some never appeared again afterwards.

=== Hyper-threading ===
Hyper-threading is Intel's proprietary simultaneous multithreading (SMT) implementation used to improve parallelization of computations (doing multiple tasks at once) performed on x86 processors. Intel introduced it with NetBurst processors in 2002. Later Intel reintroduced it in the Nehalem microarchitecture after its absence in the Core 2.

=== Quad-Pumped Front-Side Bus ===
The Northwood and Willamette cores feature an external Front Side Bus (FSB) that runs at 100 MHz which transfers four bits per clock cycle, thus having an effective speed of 400 MHz. Later revisions of the Northwood core, along with the Prescott core (and derivatives) have an effective 800 MHz front-side bus (200 MHz quad pumped).

=== Hyper-Pipelined Technology ===
The Willamette and Northwood cores contain a 20-stage instruction pipeline. This is a significant increase in the number of stages compared to the Pentium III, which had only 10 stages in its pipeline. The Prescott core increased the length of the pipeline to 31 stages. A drawback of longer pipelines is the increase in the number of stages that need to be traced back in the event of a branch misprediction, increasing the penalty of said misprediction. To address this issue, Intel devised the Rapid Execution Engine and has invested a great deal into its branch prediction technology, which Intel claims reduces branch mispredictions by 33% over Pentium III. In reality, the longer pipeline resulted in reduced efficiency through a lower number of instructions per clock (IPC) executed as high enough clock speeds were not able to be reached to offset lost performance due to larger than expected increase in power consumption and heat.

=== Rapid Execution Engine ===
With this technology, the two arithmetic logic units (ALUs) in the core of the CPU are double-pumped, meaning that they actually operate at twice the core clock frequency. For example, in a 3.8 GHz processor, the ALUs will effectively be operating at 7.6 GHz. The reason behind this is to generally make up for the low IPC count; additionally this considerably enhances the integer performance of the CPU. Intel also replaced the high-speed barrel shifter with a shift/rotate execution unit that operates at the same frequency as the CPU core. The downside is that certain instructions are now much slower (relatively and absolutely) (Note: "Relatively" as the number of cycles needed for the instruction to complete, where "absolute" stands for time it takes for the instruction to complete, after taking account of the clock speed. For example, an instruction taking 10 cycles on a 1 GHz processor takes 10 nanoseconds; it is therefore relatively slower and absolutely faster than an instruction taking 1 cycle on a 0.01 GHz (100 nanoseconds) processor.) than before, making optimization for multiple target CPUs difficult. An example is shift and rotate operations, which suffer from the lack of a barrel shifter which was present on every x86 CPU beginning with the i386, including the main competitor processor, Athlon.

=== Execution Trace Cache ===
Within the L1 cache of the CPU, Intel incorporated its Execution Trace Cache. It stores decoded micro-operations, so that when executing a new instruction, instead of fetching and decoding the instruction again, the CPU directly accesses the decoded micro-ops from the trace cache, thereby saving considerable time. Moreover, the micro-ops are cached in their predicted path of execution, which means that when instructions are fetched by the CPU from the cache, they are already present in the correct order of execution. Intel later introduced a similar but simpler concept with Sandy Bridge called micro-operation cache (UOP cache).

=== Replay system ===
The replay system is a subsystem within the Intel Pentium 4 processor to catch operations that have been mistakenly sent for execution by the processor's scheduler. Operations caught by the replay system are then re-executed in a loop until the conditions necessary for their proper execution have been fulfilled.

=== Branch prediction hints ===
The Intel NetBurst architecture allows branch prediction hints to be inserted into the code to tell whether the static prediction should be taken or not taken, while this feature was abandoned in later Intel processors. According to Intel, NetBurst's branch prediction algorithm is 33% better than the one in P6.

=== Issues in development and scaling ===
Despite these enhancements, the NetBurst architecture created obstacles for engineers trying to scale up its performance. Intel initially planned to attain clock speeds of 10 GHz by simply raising the clock speed over time, but faced increasing problems with keeping power and heat dissipation under control and ran out of steam by November 2004; well below their target at just 3.8 GHz. For the mobile sector, the NetBurst-powered Pentium 4-M proved to be not suitable due to its lower performance-per-watt and higher heat output compared to outgoing designs. Intel made the decision to backtrack to P6 and iterated upon the Pentium III's new Tualatin core to create the Pentium M line of processors, which ultimately led to the creation of the Core microarchitecture.

== Revisions ==
Revision	Processor Brand(s)	Pipeline stages
Willamette (180 nm)	Celeron, Pentium 4, Xeon	20
Northwood (130 nm)	Celeron, Pentium 4, Pentium 4 HT, Pentium 4 HT Extreme Edition, Xeon	20
Prescott (90 nm)	Celeron D, Pentium 4, Pentium 4 HT, Pentium 4 HT Extreme Edition, Xeon	31
Cedar Mill (65 nm)	Celeron D, Pentium 4 HT	31
Smithfield (90 nm)	Pentium D, Xeon	31
Presler (65 nm)	Pentium D, Xeon	31

Intel replaced the original Willamette core with a redesigned version of the NetBurst microarchitecture called Northwood in January 2002. The Northwood design combined an increased cache size, a smaller 130 nm fabrication process, and Hyper-threading (although initially all models but the 3.06 GHz model had this feature disabled) to produce a more modern, higher-performing version of the NetBurst microarchitecture.

In February 2004, Intel introduced Prescott, a more radical revision of the microarchitecture. The Prescott core was produced on a 90 nm process, and included several major design changes, including the addition of an even larger cache (from 512 KB in the Northwood to 1 MB, and 2 MB in Prescott 2M), a much deeper instruction pipeline (31 stages as compared to 20 in the Northwood), a heavily improved branch predictor, the introduction of the SSE3 instructions, and later, the implementation of Intel Extended Memory 64 Technology (EM64T), Intel's branding for their compatible implementation of the x86-64 64-bit version of the x86 microarchitecture (as with hyper-threading, all Prescott chips branded Pentium 4 HT have hardware to support this feature, but it was initially only enabled on the high-end Xeon processors, before being officially introduced in processors with the Pentium trademark). Power consumption and heat dissipation also became major issues with Prescott, which quickly became the hottest-running, and most power-hungry, of Intel's single-core x86 and x86-64 processors. Power and heat concerns prevented Intel from releasing a Prescott clocked above 3.8 GHz, along with a mobile version of the core clocked above 3.46 GHz.

Intel also released a dual-core processor based on the NetBurst microarchitecture branded Pentium D. The first Pentium D core was codenamed Smithfield, which is actually two Prescott cores in a single die, and later Presler, which consists of two Cedar Mill cores on two separate dies (Cedar Mill being the 65 nm die-shrink of Prescott).

== Roadmap ==
Atom (ULV)		Node name	Pentium/Core						
Microarch.	Step	Node name	Microarch.	Step					
		600 nm	P6	Pentium Pro (133 MHz)					
		500 nm	P6	Pentium Pro (150 MHz)					
		350 nm	P6	Pentium Pro (166–200 MHz)					
		350 nm	P6	Klamath					
		250 nm	P6	Deschutes					
		250 nm	P6	Katmai	NetBurst				
		180 nm	P6	Coppermine	Willamette				
		130 nm	P6	Tualatin	Northwood				
		130 nm	Pentium M (P6)	Banias	Northwood		NetBurst(HT)		NetBurst(×2)
		90 nm	Pentium M (P6)	Dothan	Prescott	⇨	Prescott‑2M	⇨	Smithfield
		90 nm	Pentium M (P6)	Dothan	~~Tejas~~	→	⇩	→	~~Cedarmill (Tejas)~~
		65 nm	Pentium M (P6)	Yonah	~~Nehalem (NetBurst)~~		Cedar Mill	⇨	Presler
		65 nm	Core	Merom	4 cores on mainstream desktop, DDR3 introduced				
Bonnell	Bonnell	45 nm	Core	Penryn					
Bonnell	Bonnell	45 nm	Nehalem	Nehalem	HT reintroduced, integrated MC, PCH; L3-cache introduced, 256 KB L2-cache/core				
Bonnell	Saltwell	32 nm	Nehalem	Westmere	Introduced GPU on same package and AES-NI				
Bonnell	Saltwell	32 nm	Sandy Bridge	Sandy Bridge	On-die ring bus, no more non-UEFI motherboards				
Silvermont	Silvermont	22 nm	Sandy Bridge	Ivy Bridge					
Silvermont	Silvermont	22 nm	Haswell	Haswell	Fully integrated voltage regulator				
Silvermont	Airmont	14 nm	Haswell	Broadwell					
Silvermont	Airmont	14 nm	Skylake	Skylake	DDR4 introduced on mainstream desktop				
Goldmont		14 nm	Skylake	Kaby Lake					
Goldmont		14 nm	Skylake	Coffee Lake	6 cores on mainstream desktop				
Goldmont		14 nm	Skylake	Amber Lake	Mobile-only				
Goldmont Plus		14 nm	Skylake	Whiskey Lake	Mobile-only				
Goldmont Plus		14 nm	Skylake	Coffee Lake Refresh	8 cores on mainstream desktop				
Goldmont Plus		14 nm	Skylake	Comet Lake	10 cores on mainstream desktop				
Goldmont Plus		14 nm	Sunny Cove	Cypress Cove (Rocket Lake)	Backported Sunny Cove microarchitecture for 14 nm				
Tremont		10 nm	Skylake	Palm Cove (Cannon Lake)	Mobile-only				
Tremont		10 nm	Sunny Cove	Sunny Cove (Ice Lake)	512 KB L2-cache/core				
Tremont		10 nm	Sunny Cove	Willow Cove (Tiger Lake)	X^{e} graphics engine				
Gracemont		Intel 7 (10 nm ESF)	Golden Cove	Golden Cove (Alder Lake)	Hybrid, DDR5, PCIe 5.0				
Gracemont		Intel 7 (10 nm ESF)	Golden Cove	Raptor Cove (Raptor Lake)					
Crestmont		Intel 4	Redwood Cove	Meteor Lake	Mobile-only; NPU, chiplet architecture				
Crestmont		Intel 3	Redwood Cove	Arrow Lake-U					
Skymont		TSMC N3B	Lion Cove	Lunar Lake	Low power mobile only (9–30 W)				
Skymont		TSMC N3B	Lion Cove	Arrow Lake					
Darkmont		Intel 18A	Cougar Cove	Panther Lake					
Arctic Wolf		Intel 18A and/or TSMC N2P	Coyote Cove	Nova Lake					

== Successor ==
Intel had NetBurst-based successors in development called Tejas and Jayhawk with between 40 and 50 pipeline stages, but ultimately decided to replace NetBurst with the Core microarchitecture, released in July 2006; these successors were more directly derived from the Pentium Pro (P6 microarchitecture). August 8, 2008 marked the end of Intel NetBurst-based processors. The reason for NetBurst's abandonment was the severe heat problems caused by high clock speeds. While some Core- and Nehalem-based processors have higher TDPs, most processors are multi-core, so each core gives off a fraction of the maximum TDP, and the highest-clocked Core-based single-core processors give off a maximum of 27 W of heat. The fastest-clocked desktop Pentium 4 processors (single-core) had TDPs of 115 W, compared to 88 W for the fastest clocked mobile versions. Although, with the introduction of new steppings, TDPs for some models were eventually lowered.

The Nehalem microarchitecture, the successor to the Core microarchitecture, was supposed to be an evolution of NetBurst according to Intel roadmaps dating back to 2000. Nehalem reimplements certain features of NetBurst, including the Hyper-Threading technology first introduced in the 3.06 GHz Northwood core, and L3 cache, first implemented on a consumer processor in the Gallatin core used in the Pentium 4 Extreme Edition.

== NetBurst-based chips ==
- Celeron (NetBurst)
- Celeron D
- Pentium 4
- Pentium 4 Extreme Edition
- Pentium D
- Pentium Extreme Edition
- Xeon, from 2001 through 2006

== See also ==
- Megahertz myth
- List of Intel CPU microarchitectures
- List of Intel Celeron processors (NetBurst-based)
- List of Intel Pentium 4 processors
- List of Intel Pentium D processors
- List of Intel Xeon processors (NetBurst-based)
- Tick–tock model
