= Pentium D =

Family of Intel microprocessors

- Logo as of 2006

General information
- Launched: May 25, 2005; 21 years ago
- Discontinued: July 13, 2010; 16 years ago
- Marketed by: Intel
- Designed by: Intel
- Common manufacturer: Intel
- CPUID code: 0F47h (Smithfield); 0F65h (Presler)
- Product code: Smithfield: 80551; Presler: 80553

Performance
- Max. CPU clock rate: 2.66 GHz to 3.73 GHz
- FSB speeds: 533 MT/s to 1066 MT/s

Physical specifications
- Transistors: Smithfield: 176 million; Presler: 376 million
- Cores: 2 (2×1)
- Socket: LGA 775 (Socket T)

Cache
- L1 cache: 32 KB (16 KB (8 KB instructions + 8 KB data) x 2)
- L2 cache: 2–4 MB

Architecture and classification
- Application: Dual-core desktop
- Technology node: 90 nm to 65 nm
- Microarchitecture: NetBurst
- Instruction set: x86-64
- Instructions: MMX, SSE, SSE2, SSE3
- Extensions: EIST, VT-x

Products, models, variants
- Core names: Smithfield; Presler

History
- Predecessors: Pentium 4; Pentium 4 HT
- Successors: Core 2 (2006); Pentium Dual-Core (2007)

Support status
- Unsupported

Pentium D is a range of desktop 64-bit x86-64 processors based on the NetBurst microarchitecture, which is the dual-core variant of the Pentium 4 manufactured by Intel, targeted at the non-consumer workstation and high-end desktop markets. Each CPU comprised two cores. The brand's first processor, codenamed Smithfield and manufactured on the 90 nm process, was released on May 25, 2005, followed by the 65 nm Presler nine months later. The core implementation on the 90 nm Smithfield and later 65 nm Presler are designed differently but are functionally the same. The 90 nm Smithfield contains a single die, with two adjoined but functionally separate CPU cores cut from the same wafer. The later 65 nm Presler utilized a multi-chip module package, where two discrete dies each containing a single core reside on the CPU substrate. Neither the 90 nm Smithfield nor the 65 nm Presler were capable of direct core to core communication, relying instead on the northbridge link to send information between the two cores.

By 2004, the NetBurst processors reached a clock speed barrier at 3.8 GHz due to a thermal (and power) limit exemplified by the Presler's 130 watt thermal design power (a higher TDP requires additional cooling that can be prohibitively noisy or expensive). The future belonged to more energy efficient and slower clocked dual-core CPUs on a single die instead of two. However, the Pentium D did not offer significant upgrades in design, still resulting in relatively high power consumption.

The final shipment date of the dual die Presler chips was August 8, 2008, which marked the end of the Pentium D brand as well as the NetBurst microarchitecture. The Pentium D line was removed from the official price lists on July 13, 2010, the same day support for Windows 2000 and Windows XP SP2 ended.

== Pentium D/Extreme Edition ==
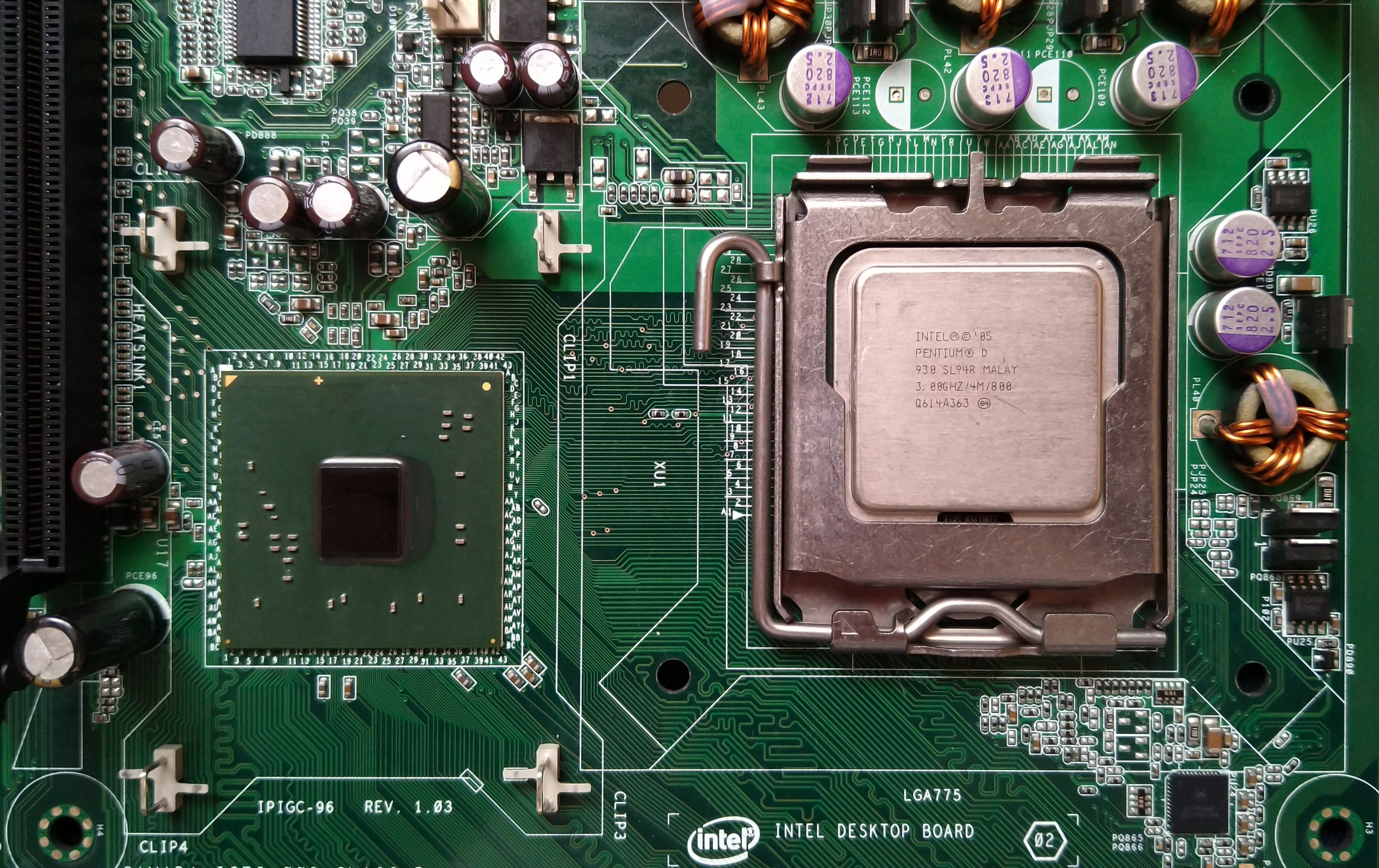
Pentium D 930 (Presler) with Intel 945GC chipset

The dual-core CPU is capable of running multi-threaded applications typical in transcoding of audio and video, compressing, photo and video editing and rendering, and ray-tracing. Single-threaded applications, including most older games, do not benefit much from a second core compared to an equally clocked single-core CPU. Nevertheless, the dual-core CPU is useful to run both the client and server processes of a game without noticeable lag in either thread, as each instance could be running on a different core. Furthermore, multi-threaded games benefit from dual-core CPUs.

In 2008, many business applications were not optimized for multiple cores. They ran at similar speed when not multitasking on the Pentium D or older Pentium 4 branded CPUs at the same clock speed. However, in multitasking environments such as BSD, Linux, Microsoft Windows operating systems, other processes are often running at the same time; if they require significant CPU time, each core of the Pentium D branded processor can handle different programs, improving overall processing speed over its single-core Pentium 4 counterpart.

Intel Pentium D processor family
Original logo	2006 logo	Desktop		
Original logo	2006 logo	Code-named	Node	Date released
Pentium D logo as of 2005	Pentium D logo as of 2006	Smithfield; Presler	90 nm 65 nm	May 2005; Jan 2006
Original Pentium Extreme Edition logo	Pentium Extreme Edition logo as of 2006	Smithfield XE; Presler XE	90 nm 65 nm	Apr 2005; Jan 2006
List of Intel Pentium D processors

=== Smithfield ===
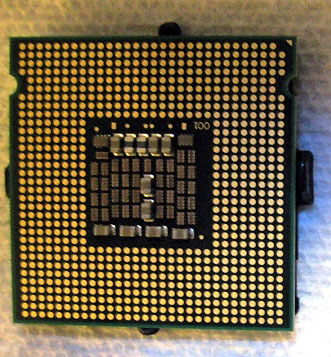
Underside of a Pentium D 820

In April 2005, Intel's biggest rival, AMD, had x86 dual-core processors intended for workstations and servers on the market, and was poised to launch a comparable product intended for desktop computers. As a response, Intel developed Smithfield, the first x86 dual-core processor intended for desktop computers, beating AMD's Athlon 64 X2 by a few weeks. Intel first launched Smithfield on April 16, 2005 in the form of the 3.2 GHz Hyper-threading enabled Pentium Extreme Edition 840. On May 26, 2005, Intel launched the mainstream Pentium D branded processor lineup with initial clock speeds of 2.8, 3.0, and 3.2 GHz with model numbers of 820, 830, and 840 respectively. In March 2006, Intel launched the last Smithfield processor, the entry-level Pentium D 805, clocked at 2.66 GHz with a 533 MT/s bus. The relatively cheap 805 was found to be highly overclockable; 3.5 GHz was often possible with good air cooling. Running it at over 4 GHz was possible with water cooling, and at this speed the 805 outperformed the top-of-the-line processors (May 2006) from both major CPU manufacturers (the AMD Athlon 64 FX-60 and Intel Pentium Extreme Edition 965) in many benchmarks including power consumption.

The 805 and 820 models had a 95 watt TDP. All other models were rated at 130 watt.

All Smithfield processors were made of two 90 nm Prescott cores, next to each other on a single die with 1 MB of Level 2 (L2) cache per core. Hyper-threading was disabled in all Pentium D 8xx-series Smithfields with the exception of the Pentium Extreme Edition 840. Smithfield did not support Intel VT-x—Intel's x86 virtualization (formerly Vanderpool).

All Pentium D processors supported Intel 64 (formerly EM64T), XD Bit, and were manufactured for the LGA 775 form factor. The only motherboards guaranteed to work with the Pentium D (and Extreme Edition) branded CPUs were those based on the 945-, 955-, 965- and 975-series Intel chipsets, as well as the nForce 4 SLI Intel Edition and ATI Radeon Xpress. The Pentium D 820 did not work with the nForce 4 SLI Intel Edition chipset due to some power design issues, though they were rectified in the X16 version. The 915- and 925-series chipsets did not work at all with the Smithfields, as they did not support more than one core (to prevent manufacturers making a cheap dual CPU motherboard capable of supporting Xeon CPUs, as had happened with the 875P chipset). The 865- and 875-series chipsets supported multiprocessing. Motherboards with them might be Pentium D compatible with an updated BIOS.

A week after its launch, Intel officially denied a report in Computerworld Today Australia that the Pentium D branded CPUs included "secret" digital rights management features in their hardware that could be utilized by Microsoft Windows and other operating systems, but was not publicly disclosed. While Intel admitted that there were some DRM technologies in the 945- and 955-series chipsets, it stated that the extent of the technologies was exaggerated, and that the technologies in question had been present in Intel's chipsets since the 875P.

=== Smithfield XE ===
The Pentium Extreme Edition (PXE) was introduced at the Spring 2005 Intel Developers Forum, not to be confused with the "Pentium 4 Extreme Edition" (an earlier, single-core processor occupying the same niche). The processor was based on the dual-core Pentium D branded Smithfield, but with Hyper-threading enabled, thus any operating system saw four logical processors. It also had an unlocked multiplier to allow for easier overclocking. It was initially released as Intel Pentium Extreme Edition 840 at 3.20 GHz, in early 2005, at a price point of $999.99 (OEM) or $1,200 (retail). The only chipsets that worked with the Extreme Edition 840 were Intel's 955X, Nvidia's nForce4 SLI Intel Edition, and ATI Radeon Xpress 200. Using a Pentium Extreme Edition branded CPU with an Intel 945-series chipset will disable Hyper-threading.

=== Presler ===
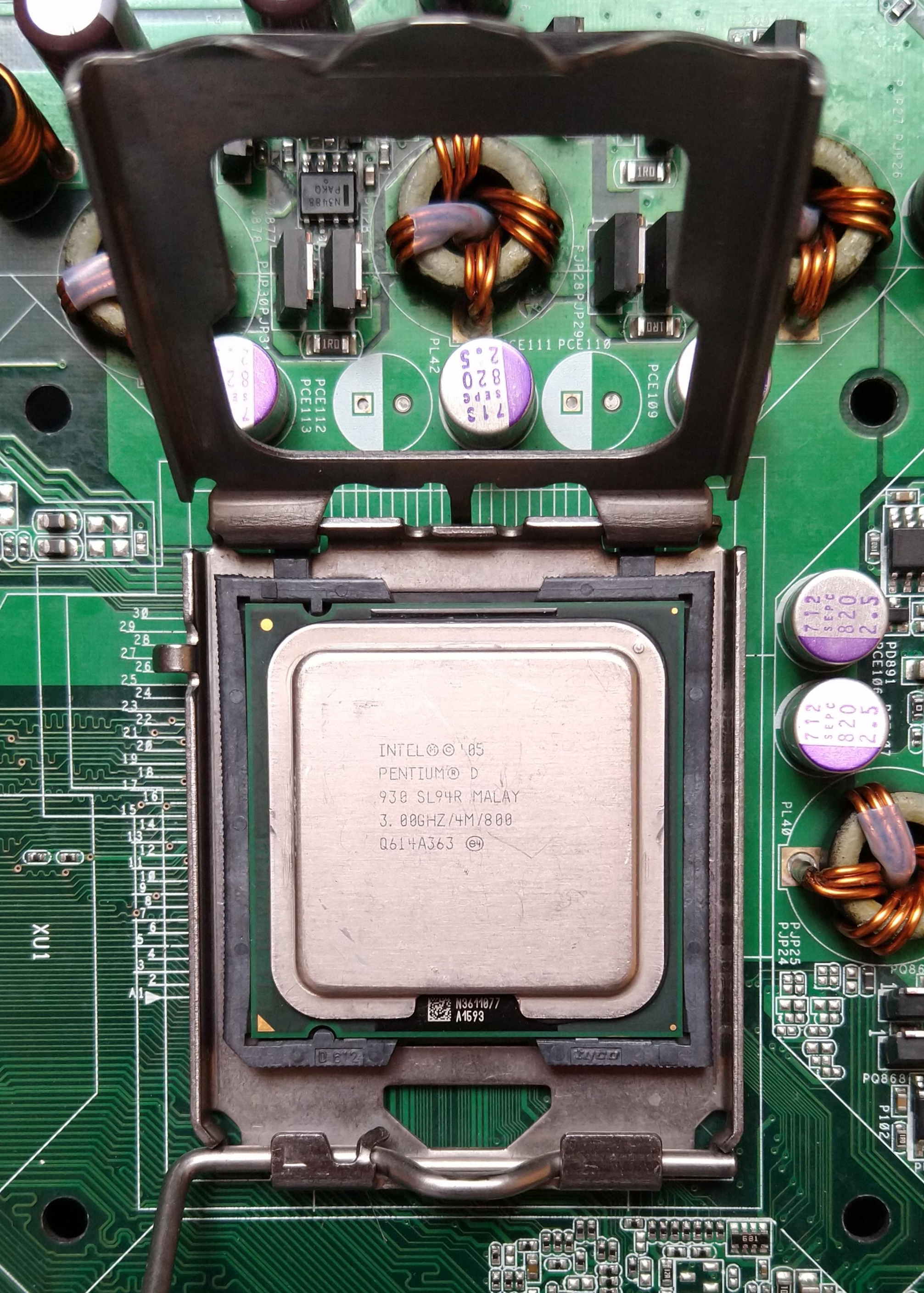
Intel Pentium D 930 3.00GHz on an Intel D945GCCR motherboard

The last generation of Pentium D branded processors was Presler released on January 16, 2006, identified by the product code 80553, and made of two 65 nm process cores found also in Pentium 4 branded Cedar Mill CPUs. Presler introduced the multi-chip module, or MCM, which consisted of two single-core dies placed next to each other on the same substrate package. This allowed Intel to produce these processors at a reduced production cost as a result of higher yields. Presler was supported by the same chipsets as Smithfield. It was produced using 65 nm technology similar to Yonah. Presler communicated with the system using an 800 MT/s FSB, and its two cores communicated also using the FSB, just as in Smithfield. Presler also included Intel VT-x (formerly Vanderpool) – although this was limited to the 9x0 models, and not in the 9x5 models– Intel 64, XD bit, and Enhanced Intel SpeedStep Technology (EIST). Presler was released in the first quarter of 2006 with a 2×2 MB Level 2 cache. Its models included 915, 920, 925, 930, 935, 940, 945, 950 and 960 (with a respective 2.8, 2.8, 3.0, 3,0, 3.2, 3.2, 3.4, 3.4, and 3.6 GHz clock frequency).

All steppings of Presler models 915, 920, 925, 930, and 935, as well as the C1, D0 steppings of 940, 945 featured a 95 watt TDP. All other models (i.e. certain models with 3.2 GHz or faster clock frequencies) were rated at 130 watt — a 37% increase in power consumption.

[*] The first batch of Presler processors (revision B1) had the EIST feature turned off by a microcode update because of stability issues. That affected only its power consumption, when idle, and thermal dissipation. Chips with working EIST started shipping in Q2 2006. They had a different S-Spec number which can be found in Intel errata documentation.

=== Presler XE ===
The Pentium Extreme Edition based on the dual-core Pentium D branded Presler was introduced as the 955 model, at 3.46 GHz, and used a 1066 MT/s FSB compared to the 800 MT/s in the non-Extreme edition. A second version, the 965 at 3.73 GHz followed in March 2006. Both CPUs also feature Hyper-Threading Technology and an unlocked multiplier. Overclockers have been able to overclock the core to 4.26 GHz using air cooling simply by raising the unlocked CPU multiplier.

The Presler Extreme Edition was intended to only be combined with the Intel 975X chipset, it could also work with the 955X chipset, though this combination was not supported by Intel. The i975X featured the ICH7R southbridge and supported all LGA 775 (Socket T) Pentium 4, Pentium D, and Pentium Extreme Edition branded processors.

== Successor ==
The Pentium D brand was merged with the Pentium 4 brand and succeeded on July 27, 2006, by the Core 2 branded line of processors with the Core microarchitecture released as dual- and quad-core processors branded Duo, Quad, and Extreme.

== Implementation ==
In a single-processor scenario, the CPU-to-northbridge link is point-to-point and the only real requirement is that it is fast enough to keep the CPU fed with data from memory.

The Pentium D is essentially two CPUs in the same package, and it has the same bus contention issues as a pair of Xeons prior to the Dual Independent Bus architecture introduced with the Dual-Core Dempsey Xeons. To use a crude analogy one could say that instead of using a single cable between CPU and north bridge, one must use a Y-splitter. Leaving aside advanced issues such as cache coherency, each core can only use half of the 800 MT/s FSB bandwidth when under heavy load.

== Comparison to Athlon 64 X2 ==
The competing AMD Athlon 64 X2, although running at lower clock rates and lacking hyper-threading, had some significant advantages over the Pentium D, such as an integrated memory controller, a high-speed HyperTransport bus, a shorter pipeline (12 stages compared to the Pentium D's 31), and better floating point performance, more than offsetting the difference in raw clock speed. Also, while the Athlon 64 X2 inherited mature multi-core control logic from the multi-core Opteron, the Pentium D was seemingly rushed to production and essentially consisted of two CPUs in the same package. Indeed, shortly after the launch of the mainstream Pentium D branded processors (26 May 2005) and the Athlon 64 X2 (31 May 2005), a consensus arose that AMD's implementation of multi-core was superior to that of the Pentium D. As a result of this and other factors, AMD surpassed Intel in desktop PC sales at US retail stores for a period of time, although Intel retained overall market leadership because of its exclusive relationships with direct sellers such as Dell.

== Comparison to Pentium Dual-Core ==
In 2007, Intel released a new line of desktop processors under the brand Pentium Dual Core, using the Core microarchitecture which is based on P6. The newer Pentium Dual-Core processors give off considerably less heat (65 watt max) than the Pentium D (95 or 130 watt max). They also run at lower clock rates, only have up to 2 MB L2 Cache memory while the Pentium D has up to 2×2 MB, and they lack Hyper-threading.

The Pentium Dual-Core has a wider execution unit (four issues wide compared to the Pentium D's three) and its 14 stages-long pipeline is less than half the length of the Pentium D's, allowing it to outperform the Pentium D in most applications despite having lower clock speeds and less L2 cache memory.

== See also ==
- List of Intel Pentium D processors

Preceded by Pentium 4 Pentium 4 HT	Pentium D 2005–2008	Succeeded by Intel Core 2
