= Sunrise Point =

Sunrise Point may refer to:

- A viewpoint in Bryce Canyon National Park
- The codename for an Intel chipset, see List of Intel chipsets#LGA 1151 rev 1
