= List of Intel chipsets =

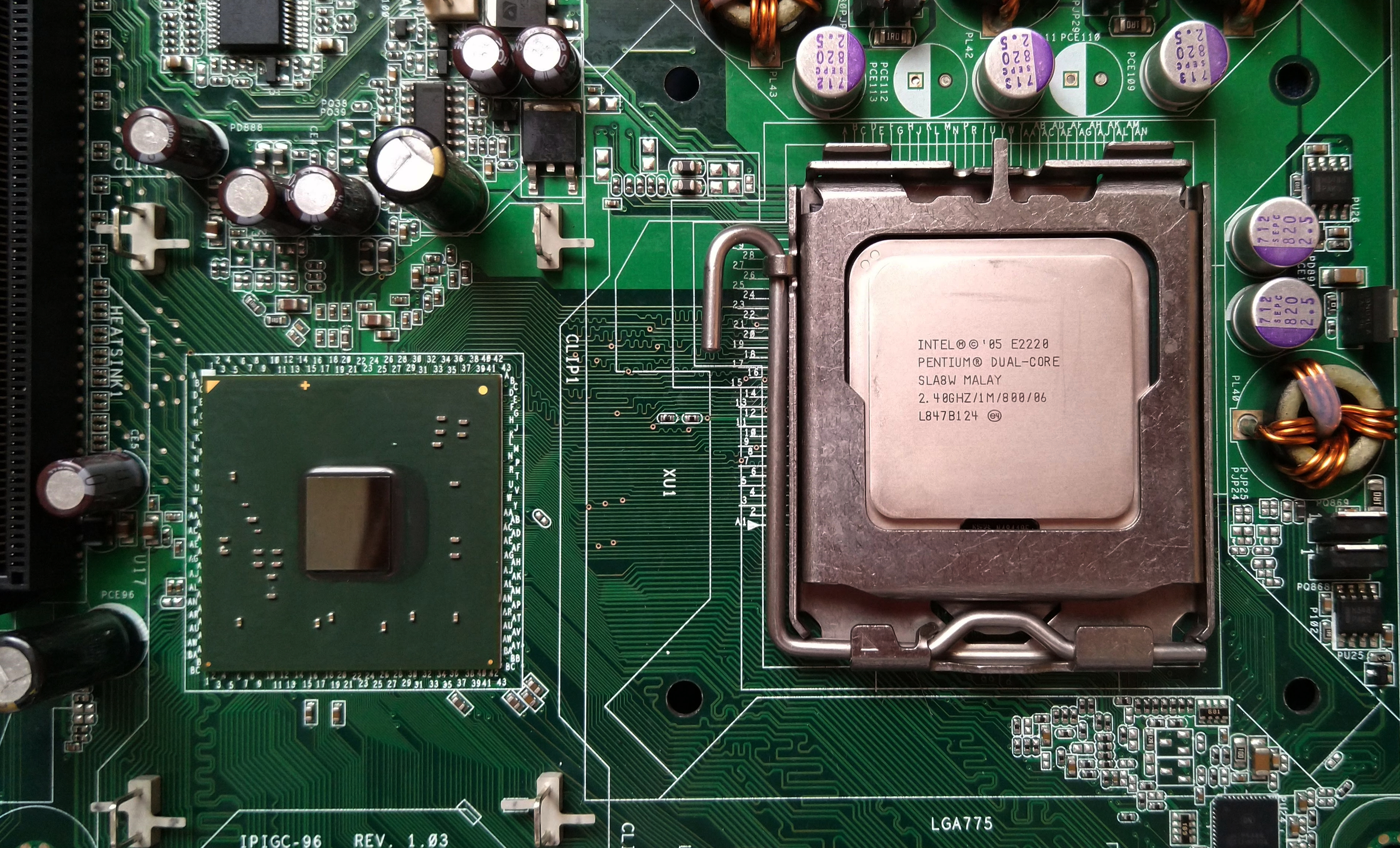
Intel i945GC northbridge with Pentium Dual-Core microprocessor

This article provides a list of motherboard chipsets made by Intel, divided into three main categories: those that use the PCI bus for interconnection (the 4xx series), those that connect using specialized "hub links" (the 8xx series), and those that connect using PCI Express (the 9xx series). The chipsets are listed in chronological order.

== Pre-chipset situation ==
An earlier chipset support for Intel 8085 microprocessor can be found at MCS-85 family section.

Early IBM XT-compatible mainboards did not yet have a chipset, but relied instead on a collection of discrete TTL chips by Intel:

- the 8284 clock generator
- the 8288 bus controller
- the 8254 programmable interval timer
- the 8255 parallel I/O interface
- the 8259 programmable interrupt controller
- the 8237 DMA controller

== Early chipsets ==
To integrate the functions needed on a mainboard into a smaller number of ICs, Intel licensed the ZyMOS POACH chipset for its Intel 80286 and Intel 80386SX processors (the 82230/82231 High Integration AT-Compatible Chip Set). The 82230 covers this combination of chips: 82C284 clock, 82288 bus controller, and dual 8259A interrupt controllers among with other components. The 82231 covers this combination of chips: 8254 interrupt timer, 74LS612 memory mapper and dual 8237A DMA controller among with other components. Both set were available US$60 for 10 MHz version and US$90 for 12 MHz version in quantities of 100. This chipset can be used with an 82335 High-integration Interface Device to provide support for the Intel 386SX.

List of early Intel chipset includes:

- 82077AA CHMOS Single-Chip Floppy Disk Controller for the 32-bit systems.
- 82091AA EISA/ISA – Advanced Integrated Peripheral (AIP), includes: floppy disk controller, 2× UARTs, parallel port, IDE controller, oscillator, etc.
- 82310 MCA family chipset – announced in April 1988. This chipset also supports the 80386SX based machines as well. Which it does includes:
  - 82306 Local Channel Support Chip
  - 82307 DMA Controller/Central Arbiter
  - 82308 Micro Channel Bus Controller
  - 82309 Address Bus Controller
  - 82706 VGA Graphics Controller
- 82311 MCA – announced in November 1988. Includes: 82303 and 82304 Local I/O Channel Support Chips, 82307 DMA Controller/Central Arbiter, 82308 Micro Channel Bus Controller, 82309 Address Bus Controller, 82706 VGA Graphics Controller, 82077 Floppy Disk Controller.
- 82320 MCA – announced in April 1989. This chipset supports the i486 microprocessor. It was expected to be available in the later half of 1989.
- 82340SX PC AT – announced in January 1990, it is the Topcat chipset licensed from VLSI.
- 82340DX PC AT – announced in January 1990, it is the Topcat chipset licensed from VLSI.
- 82350 EISA – announced in September 1988. This chipset supports the i486 microprocessor. It was expected to be available in the later half of 1989.
- 82350DT EISA – announced in April 1991. This version supports Intel486 DX2 CPU.
- 82360SL – announced in October 1990. It was a chipset for the mobile 80386SL and 80486SL processors. It integrated DMA controller, an interrupt controller PIC, serial and parallel ports, I/O Control, NMI, Real Time Clock, Timers and power-management logic for the processor. This chipset contains 226,000 transistors using the one-micron CHMOS IV technology. It was available for US$45 in quantities of 1,000.
- 82365SL – PC Card Interface Controller. This support PCMCIA 2.0 standard using the Exchangeable Card Architecture which supports both I/O and memory ExCA-compliant cards. It uses the Intel386SL power-management features. This was available for US$35 in samples of quantities of 1,000-unit.
- 82380 – High Performance 32-Bit DMA Controller with Integrated System Support Peripherals. This chipset has 20-level programmable interrupt controller a superset of Intel's 82C59 PIC. It also has four (x4) 16-bit programmable internal timers which its superset Intel's 82C54 PIT. It also has built-in DRAM refresh controller as well. It is available for US$149 and US$299 for 16 MHz and 20 MHz respectively in quantities of 100. The Intel M82380 met under MIL-STD-883 Rev. C standard. This military device was tested which includes temperature cycling between -55 and 125 °C, hermeticity and extended burn-in. This military version can have transfer rate of 32 Mbytes per seconds at 16 MHz. This military version were available in 132-lead CPGA and 164-lead CQPK. This military version were available for US$520 100-unit of quantities for the PGA version.
- 82384 – Clock Generator. The available version for US$15 in quantities of 100.
- 82385 – High Performance 32-Bit Cache Controller. This chipset was introduced in February 1987. It was available for 20 MHz version. There is 33 MHz version available for the 386DX processor. Paired with 33 MHz 386 CPU and 64-Kbyte memory subsystem, it performed up to 7.8 MIPS. There is 82385SX version for the 386SX microprocessor.
- 82395DX – High Performance Smart Cache. This chipset contains internal 16-Kbye of SRAM and 1,000 cache tags. This controller supports up to 128-Kbytes of cache memory subsystem which it features four-way set associativity; a 16-byte line size; a four, double-word write buffer; and concurrent line-buffer caching. This also support write-buffer memory update protocol and maintains cache coherency during bus snooping. Paired with 33 MHz 386 CPU and the controller can perform up to 8.3 MIPS. This was available in 196-pin PQFP for US$90 and $109 for 25- and 33-MHZ version in quantities of 1000 respectively. There is Intel 82395SX version which it contains 8-Kbyte of cache memory for the 80386SX microprocessor family which it performs as much as 7% better than the 82385SX version. It was available for US$44 in quantities of 1000 units housed by 132-pin PQFP. The Intel 82396SX version contains 16-Kbyte of cache memory which were available in second quarter of 1991.

== 4xx chipsets ==
=== 80486 chipsets ===
Chipset	Code name	North bridge	sSpec number	South bridge	Release date	Processors	FSB	SMP	Memory types	Max. memory	Max. cacheable	Parity/ECC	L2 cache type	PCI support
420TX	Saturn	CDC (82424TX), DPU (82423TX)	SZ839 SZ868	SIO (System I/O)	November 1992	5 V 486	Up to 33 MHz	No	FPM	128 MB (Note: When applied to computer memory (RAM or cache) the quantities KB, MB and GB are defined as: 1 KB = 1024 B, 1 MB = 1024 KB, 1 GB = 1024 MB, consistent with the JEDEC memory standard.)		Parity	Async.	1.0
420ZX	Saturn II	CDC (82424ZX), DPU (82423TX)	SZ884	SIO (System I/O)	March 1994	5 V/3.3 V 486	Up to 33 MHz	No	FPM	160 MB		Parity	Async.	2.1
420EX	Aries	PSC (82425EX)	SZ897 (PSC) SZ898 (IB)	IB (82426EX)	March 1994	5 V/3.3 V 486	Up to 50 MHz	No	FPM	128 MB	128 MB (/w 32KB Tag Ram & 512KB L2 Cache	Parity	Async.	2.0

==== Other 80486 chipsets ====
- 82495DX – Cache Controller. This support zero-wait-state with two-way set associative cache with several configurable parameters. This support MESI protocol and bus snooping. It is available for US$198.
- 82490DX – 32-Kbyte Dual Port Intelligent Cache SRAM. Providing second level write-back cache with dual-ported buffers and registers. It is available for US$41.

=== Pentium chipsets ===
While not an actual Intel chipset bug, the Mercury and Neptune chipsets could be found paired with RZ1000 and CMD640 IDE controllers with data corruption bugs. L2 caches are direct-mapped with SRAM tag RAM, write-back for 430FX, HX, VX, and TX. The ISA 82430 PCIset and EISA 82430 PCIset were available for USD $76 and USD $98 in 10,000-unit quantities respectfully.

Chipset	Code name	Part numbers	sSpec number	South bridge	Release date	Processors	FSB	SMP	Memory types	Max. memory	Max. cacheable	Parity/ECC	L2 cache type	PCI support	AGP support
430LX	Mercury	82434LX (PCMC); 2x 82433LX (LBX)	SZ914 (PCMC) SZ942 (LBX)	SIO (ISA); PCEB/ESC (EISA)	March 1993	P60/66	60/66 MHz	No	FPM	192 MB	192 MB	Parity	Async.	2.0	No
430NX	Neptune	82434NX (PCMC); 2x 82433NX (LBX)	SZ919 (PCMC) SZ899 (LBX)	SIO (ISA); SIO.A (DP ISA); PCEB/ESC (EISA)	March 1994	P75+	50/60/66 MHz	Yes	FPM	512 MB	512 MB	Parity	Async.	2.0	No
430FX	Triton	82437FX/JX (TSC); 2x 82438FX (TDP)	SZ965 (A1) SZ968 (A1) SZ969 SZ973 (A1) SZ975 (A1) SZ998 (A2) SZ999	PIIX	January 1995	P75+	50/60/66 MHz	No	FPM/EDO	128 MB	64 MB	Neither	Async. / Pburst	2.0	No
430MX	Mobile Triton	82437MX	SU036 (A1) SU037 (A1) SU069 (B0)	MPIIX	October 1995	P75+	50/60/66 MHz	No	FPM/EDO	128 MB	64 MB	Neither	Async. / Pburst	2.0	No
430HX	Triton II	82439HX/JHX (TXC)	SU087 (A1) SU102 (A2) SU115	PIIX3	February 1996	P75+	50/60/66 MHz	Yes	FPM/EDO	512 MB	64 MB; 512 MB (w/ 11-bit tag RAM)	Both	Async. / Pburst	2.1	No
430VX	Triton II	82437VX (TVX); 2x 82438VX (TDX)	SU085 (A1) SU116 (A2)	PIIX3	February 1996	P75+	60/66 MHz	No	FPM/EDO/SDRAM	128 MB	64 MB	Neither	Async. / Pburst	2.1	No
430TX		82439TX (MTXC)	SL238 (A1) SL28T (A2)	PIIX4	February 1997	P75+	60/66 MHz	No	FPM/EDO/SDRAM	256 MB	64 MB	Neither	Async. / Pburst	2.1	No

=== Pentium Pro/II/III chipsets ===
Chipset	Code name	Part numbers	sSpec number	South bridge	Release date	Processors (Note: The Pentium Pro, Pentium II/III, and the Celerons based on them are essentially the same design with minor internal revisions and varying cache designs. Because of this, the same chipset can be used for Socket 8, Socket 370, Slot 1, or Slot 2 designs with any CPU in the P6 family. In practice however, newer chipset designs are usually made only for the newer processor packages, and older ones may not be updated to accommodate for recent package designs. In addition, certain chipsets may be implemented in motherboards with different processor packages, much like how the 440FX could be used either with a Pentium Pro (Socket 8) or Pentium II (Slot 1). A new feature for the latest Intel chipsets is hardware virtualization support (Intel VT-d). The chipset support for this technology is not very clear for the moment.)	FSB	SMP	Memory			Parity/ECC	PCI support	AGP support
Chipset	Code name	Part numbers	sSpec number	South bridge	Release date	Processors	FSB	SMP	Type	Max.	Bank	Parity/ECC	PCI support	AGP support
450KX	Mars	82451KX, 82452KX, 82453KX, 82454KX	SU022 (A2) SU024 (A2) SU025 (A1) SU026 (A1) SU027 (A2) SU028 (A2) SU029 (A1) SU030 (A2) SU039 (A1) SU040 (A1) SU041 (A2) SU042 (A2) SU043 (A1) SU044 (A2) SU061 (A3) SU062 (A4) SU064 (A4)	SIO, SIO.A, PIIX (ISA); PCEB/ESC (EISA)	November 1995	Pentium Pro	60/66 MHz	Yes	FPM	1 GB		Both	2.0	No
450GX	Orion	82451GX, 82452GX, 82453GX, 82454GX	SU019 (A1) SU055 (A1) SU056 (A3) SU057 (A3) SU058 (A4) SU059 (A4) SU063 (A4) SY050 (A4) SY051 (A5) SY052 (A6) SY053 (A4) SY054 (A6)	SIO.A (ISA); PCEB/ESC (EISA)	November 1995	Pentium Pro	60/66 MHz	Yes (up to four)	FPM	8 GB		Both	2.0	No
440FX	Natoma	82441FX, 82442FX	SU053 (A1) SU054 (A1)	PIIX3 (ISA); PCEB/ESC (EISA)	May 1996	Pentium Pro, Pentium II	60/66 MHz	Yes	FPM / EDO / BEDO	1 GB	4	Both	2.1	No
440LX	Balboa	82443LX	SL2KK (A3) SL2KN (A3)	PIIX4	August 25, 1997	Pentium II, Celeron	66 MHz	Yes	FPM / EDO / SDRAM	1 GB EDO / 512 MB SDRAM	4	Both	2.1	AGP 2×
440EX	—N/a	82443EX	SL2SA (A0) SL2SB	PIIX4E	April 1998	Pentium II, Celeron	66 MHz	No	EDO / SDRAM	256 MB	2	Neither	2.1	AGP 2×
440BX	Seattle	82443BX 82443BXE	SL278 (C1) SL2T5 (B1) SL2VH (C1) SL85Y	PIIX4E	April 1998	Pentium II/III, Celeron	66/100 MHz	Yes	EDO / SDRAM	512 MB (1 GB w/ Registered)	4	Both	2.1	AGP 2×
440GX	Marlinspike	82443GX	SL2TF (A0) SL2VJ (A0)	PIIX4E	June 1998	Pentium II/III, Xeon	66/100 MHz	Yes	SDRAM	2 GB	4	Both	2.1	AGP 2×
450NX	—N/a	82451NX, 82452NX, 82453NX, 82454NX	SL2RU (B0) SL2RV (B1) SL2RW (B0) SL2RX (B0) SL2ZA (B1) SL36R (C0)	PIIX4E	June 1998	Pentium II/III, Xeon	66/100 MHz	Yes (up to four)	FPM / EDO	8 GB	4	Both	2.1 (64-bit optional)	No
440ZX-66	—N/a	82443ZX	SL37A	PIIX4E	November 1998	Celeron, Pentium II/III	66 MHz	No	SDRAM	512 MB	2	Neither	2.1	AGP 2×
440ZX	—N/a	82443ZX	SL33W	PIIX4E	November 1998	Celeron, Pentium II/III	66/100 MHz	No	SDRAM	512 MB	2	Neither	2.1	AGP 2×
440ZX-M	—N/a	82443ZX-M	SL3VP	PIIX4M		Pentium III, Celeron	66/100 MHz	No	SDRAM	256 MB	2	Neither	2.1	AGP 2×
440MX	Banister	82443MX	SL37L (B0) SL3N4 (B0)	Same chip		Pentium II/III, Celeron	66/100 MHz	No	SDRAM	512 MB	2	Neither	2.2	No

=== Southbridge 4xx chipsets ===
Chipset	Part number	sSpec number	ATA support	USB support	CMOS/clock	ISA support	LPC support	Power management
ESC	82374EB/SB	SZ867	None	None		Yes		
PCEB	82375EB/SB		None	None		Yes		
SIO	82378IB/ZB	SZ905	None	None	No	Yes	No	SMM
SIO.A	82379AB		None	None	No	Yes	No	SMM
MPIIX	82371MX	SU034 (A1) SU035 (A1) SU067 (A2)	PIO	None	No	Yes	No	SMM
PIIX	82371FB	SZ964 (A1) SZ967 (A1) SZ997 (A1)	PIO/WDMA	None	No	Yes	No	SMM
PIIX3	82371SB	SU052 (A1) SU093 (B0)	PIO/WDMA	1 Controller 2 Ports	No	Yes	No	SMM
PIIX4	82371AB	SL23P SL2 km (B0)	PIO/UDMA 33	1 Controller 2 Ports	Yes	Yes	No	SMM
PIIX4E	82371EB 82371EBE	SL2MY (A0) SL2T3 (A0) SL37M (A0) SL37U (A0) SL87F	PIO/UDMA 33	1 Controller 2 Ports	Yes	Yes	No	SMM
PIIX4M	82371MB	SL3CG (A0) SL3DD (A0)	PIO/UDMA 33	1 Controller 2 Ports	Yes	Yes	No	SMM

== 8xx chipsets ==
=== Pentium II/III chipsets ===
Chipset	Code name	Part numbers	sSpec number	South bridge	Release date	Processors	FSB	SMP	Memory types	Max. memory	Memory banks	Parity or ECC	PCI	Ext. AGP/speed	IGP
810	Whitney	82810	SL3P6 SL3P7 (A3) SL35K	ICH/ICH0	April 1999	Celeron, Pentium II/III	66/100 MHz	No	EDO/PC100 SDRAM	512 MB	2 (Dual Sided)	Neither	v2.2/33 MHz	No	Yes
810E	Whitney	82810E	SL3MD (A3)	ICH	September 1999	Celeron, Pentium II/III	66/100/133 MHz	No	PC100/133 SDRAM	512 MB	2 (Dual Sided)	Neither	v2.2/33 MHz	No	Yes
810E2	Whitney	82810E		ICH2		Celeron, Pentium II/III	66/100/133 MHz	No	PC100/133 SDRAM	512 MB	2 (Dual Sided)	Neither	v2.2/33 MHz	No	Yes
815	Solano	82815	SL4DF (A2) SL5YN SL5NQ	ICH	June 2000	Celeron, Pentium II/III	66/100/133 MHz	No	PC100/133 SDRAM	512 MB	3 (Dual Sided)	Neither	v2.2/33 MHz	Yes/AGP 4×	Yes
815E	Solano	82815	SL4DF (A2) SL5YN SL5NQ	ICH2	June 2000	Celeron, Pentium II/III	66/100/133 MHz	Yes (2)	PC100/133 SDRAM	512 MB	3 (Dual Sided)	Neither	v2.2/33 MHz	Yes/AGP 4×	Yes
815G	Solano	82815G		ICH/ICH0	September 2001	Celeron, Pentium III	66/100/133 MHz	No	PC100/133 SDRAM	512 MB	3 (Dual Sided)	Neither	v2.2/33 MHz	No	Yes
815EG	Solano	82815G		ICH2	September 2001	Celeron, Pentium III	66/100/133 MHz	No	PC100/133 SDRAM	512 MB	3 (Dual Sided)	Neither	v2.2/33 MHz	No	Yes
815P	Solano	82815EP		ICH/ICH0	March 2001	Celeron, Pentium III	66/100/133 MHz	No	PC100/133 SDRAM	512 MB	3 (Dual Sided)	Neither	v2.2/33 MHz	Yes/AGP 4×	No
815EP	Solano	82815EP	SL5NR (B0)	ICH2	November 2000	Celeron, Pentium II/III	66/100/133 MHz	No	PC100/133 SDRAM	512 MB	3 (Dual Sided)	Neither	v2.2/33 MHz	Yes/AGP 4×	No
820	Camino	82820 82820DP	SL353 (B1) SL3FT (B1) SL3NF (B1) SL47D (B2) SL47F (B2)	ICH	November 1999	Celeron, Pentium II/III	66/100/133 MHz	Yes	PC800 RDRAM/PC100 SDRAM (with MTH adapter)	1 GB	2 (Dual Sided)	Both	v2.2/33 MHz	Yes/AGP 4×	No
820E	Camino	82820 82820DP	SL353 (B1) SL3FT (B1) SL3NF (B1) SL47D (B2) SL47F (B2)	ICH2	June 2000	Celeron, Pentium II/III	66/100/133 MHz	Yes	PC800 RDRAM/PC100 SDRAM (with MTH adapter)	1 GB	2 (Dual Sided)	Both	v2.2/33 MHz	Yes/AGP 4×	No
840	Carmel	82840	SL3QR	ICH	October 1999	Pentium III, Xeon	66/100/133 MHz	Yes	Dual-Channel PC800 RDRAM/PC100 SDRAM (with MTH adapter)	4 GB	2×4 (Dual Sided)	Both	v2.2/33 MHz + PCI-X/66 MHz	Yes/AGP 4×	No

=== Pentium III mobile chipsets ===
Chipset	Code name	Part numbers	sSpec number	South bridge	Release date	Processors	FSB	SMP	Memory types	Max. memory	Memory banks	Parity or ECC	PCI	Ext. AGP/speed	IGP
815EM	Solano	82815EM	SL4MP	ICH2-M	October 2000	Mobile Celeron, Mobile Pentium III	100 MHz	No	PC100 SDRAM	512 MB	2	Neither	v2.2/33 MHz	Yes/AGP 4×	Yes
830M	Almador	82830M	SL62D	ICH3-M	July 2001	Celeron, Pentium III-M	100/133 MHz	No	PC133 SDRAM	1 GB	2	Neither	v2.2/33 MHz	Yes/AGP 4×	Yes
830MP	Almador	82830MP	SL5P7 SL62F SL7A6	ICH3-M		Celeron, Pentium III-M	100/133 MHz	No	PC133 SDRAM	1 GB	2	Neither	v2.2/33 MHz	Yes/AGP 4×	No
830MG	Almador	82830MG	SL5P9 SL62E	ICH3-M		Celeron, Pentium III-M	100/133 MHz	No	PC133 SDRAM	1 GB	2	Neither	v2.2/33 MHz	No	Yes

=== Pentium 4 chipsets ===
Chipset	Code name	Part numbers	sSpec number	South bridge	Release date	Socket	Processor brands	FSB	SMP	Memory types	Memory Channels	Max. memory [ GiB ]	Parity/ECC	Graphics	TDP
860	Colusa	82860 (MCH)	SL5HB	ICH2	May 2001	Socket 603 Socket 604	Xeon	400 MT/s (100 MHz QDR)	Yes	PC800/600 RDRAM	4	4 (w. 2 repeaters)	Yes/Yes	AGP 4×	
845	Brookdale	82845 (MCH)	SL5V7 (A3) SL5YQ SL63W (B0)	ICH2	September 2001	Socket 423 Socket 478	Celeron, Pentium 4	400 MT/s (100 MHz QDR)	No	DDR 200/266; SDR 133	1 (850 and 850E 2 channels)	2 (DDR); 3 (SDR)	Yes/Yes	AGP 4×	
850	Tehama	82850 (MCH)	SL4NG (A2) SL5HA (A3)	ICH2	November 2000	Socket 423 Socket 478	Celeron, Pentium 4	400 MT/s (100 MHz QDR)	No	PC800/600 RDRAM	1 (850 and 850E 2 channels)	2	Yes/Yes	AGP 4×	
850E	Tehama-E	82850E (MCH)	SL64X (A3)	ICH2/ICH4	May 2002	Socket 478	Celeron, Pentium 4	400/533 MT/s	No	PC1066/800/600 RDRAM	1 (850 and 850E 2 channels)	2	Yes/Yes	AGP 4×	
845E	Brookdale-E	82845E (MCH)	SL66N SL69S	ICH4	May 2002	Socket 478	Celeron, Celeron D, Pentium 4	400/533 MT/s	No	DDR 200/266	1 (850 and 850E 2 channels)	2	Yes/Yes	AGP 4×	5.8 W
845G	Brookdale-G	82845G (GMCH)	SL66F (A1) SL6PR (B1)	ICH4	May 2002	Socket 478	Celeron, Celeron D, Pentium 4	400/533 MT/s	No	DDR 200/266; SDR 133	1 (850 and 850E 2 channels)	2	No/No	Intel Extreme Graphics; AGP 4×	5.1 W (SDRAM), 5.7 W (DDR)
845GV	Brookdale-GV	82845GV (GMCH)	SL6NR (A1) SL6PU (B1) SL8DA	ICH4	October 2002	Socket 478; LGA 775	Celeron, Celeron D, Pentium 4	400/533 MT/s	No	DDR 200/266; SDR 133	1 (850 and 850E 2 channels)	2	No/No	Intel Extreme Graphics no AGP slot	5.1 W (SDRAM), 5.7 W (DDR)
845GL	Brookdale-GL	82845GL (GMCH)	SL66G (A1) SL6PT (B1)	ICH4	May 2002	Socket 478	Celeron, Pentium 4	400 MT/s	No	DDR 200/266; SDR 133	1 (850 and 850E 2 channels)	2	No/No	Intel Extreme Graphics no AGP slot	5.1 W (SDRAM), 5.8 W (DDR)
845GE	Brookdale-GE	82845GE (GMCH)	SL6PS	ICH4	October 2002	Socket 478; LGA 775	Celeron, Celeron D, Pentium 4	400/533 MT/s	No	DDR 200/266/333	1 (850 and 850E 2 channels)	2	No/No	Intel Extreme Graphics; AGP 4×	6.3 W
845PE	Brookdale-PE	82845PE (MCH)	SL6H5 SL6Q3	ICH4	October 2002	Socket 478	Celeron, Celeron D, Pentium 4	400/533 MT/s	No	DDR 200/266/333	1 (850 and 850E 2 channels)	2	No/No	AGP 4×	5.6 W
848P	Breeds Hill	82848P (MCH)	SL77Y (A2) SL7YG (A2)	ICH5/ICH5R	August 2003	Socket 478; LGA 775	Pentium 4, Pentium 4 EE, Pentium D, Celeron, Celeron D	400/533/800 MT/s	No	DDR-400	1 (850 and 850E 2 channels)	2	No/No	AGP 8×	8.1 W
865P	Springdale-P	82865P	SL6UY	ICH5/ICH5R	May 2003	Socket 478; LGA 775	Pentium 4, Celeron D	400/533 MT/s	No	DDR-333	2	4	No/No	AGP 8×	10.3 W
865PE	Springdale-PE	82865PE	SL722 (A2) SL7YE (A2)	ICH5/ICH5R	May 2003	Socket 478; LGA 775	Pentium 4, Pentium 4 EE, Pentium D, Pentium Extreme Edition, Celeron, Celeron D	400/533/800 MT/s	No	DDR-400	2	4	No/No	AGP 8×	11.3 W
865G	Springdale	82865G (GMCH)	SL99Y SL743 (A2)	ICH5/ICH5R	May 2003	Socket 478; LGA 775	Pentium 4, Pentium 4 EE, Pentium D, Pentium Extreme Edition, Celeron, Celeron D	400/533/800 MT/s	No	DDR-400	2	4	No/No	Intel Extreme Graphics 2 AGP 8×	12.9 W
865GV	Springdale-GV	82865GV (GMCH)	SL77X (A2) SL7YF (A2)	ICH5/ICH5R	September 2003	Socket 478; LGA 775	Pentium 4, Pentium 4 EE, Pentium D, Pentium Extreme Edition, Celeron, Celeron D	400/533/800 MT/s	No	DDR-400	2	4	No/No	Intel Extreme Graphics 2 no AGP slot	
875P	Canterwood	82875P (MCH)	SL744 (A2) SL8DB	ICH5/ICH5R/6300ESB	April 2003	Socket 478; Socket 604; LGA 775	Pentium 4, Pentium 4 EE, Pentium D, Pentium Extreme Edition, Celeron, Celeron D, Xeon	400/533/800 MT/s	No	DDR-400	2	4	Yes/Yes	AGP 8×	12.1 W
E7205	Granite Bay	E7205 (MCH)	SL65P (B0) SL6TU	ICH4	November 2002	Socket 478	Pentium 4	400/533 MT/s	No	DDR-200/266	2	4	Yes/Yes	AGP 8×	
E7500	Plumas	E7500 (MCH)	SL64H SL69U	ICH3-S	February 2002	Socket 604	Xeon	400 MT/s	Yes	DDR-200	2	16	Yes/Yes	PCI-X	
E7501	Plumas 533	E7500 (MCH)		ICH3-S	December 2002	Socket 604; Socket 479	Xeon, Pentium M	400/533 MT/s	Yes	DDR-200/266	2	16	Yes/Yes	PCI-X	
E7505	Placer	E7505 (MCH)	SL65N SL6TU	ICH4	November 2002	Socket 604	Xeon	400/533 MT/s	Yes	DDR-200/266	2	16	Yes/Yes	AGP 8×	
E7221	Copper River	E7221 (MCH)	SL7YQ	ICH6/ICH6R	September 2004	LGA 775	Pentium 4, Pentium 4 HT	533/800 MT/s	No	DDR 333/400; DDR2 400/533	2	4	Yes/Yes unbuffered only	• Integrated graphics engine (SVGA) • PCI Express ×8 (1.0a), or • PCI-X (with PCIe bridge) not specifically dedicated to graphics	
E7230	Mukilteo	E7230 (MCH)	SL8kJ SL8KK	ICH7/ICH7R	July 2005	LGA 775	Pentium D, Pentium 4, Pentium 4 HT, Pentium 4 EE, Celeron D	533/800/1066 MT/s	No	DDR2 400/533/667	2	8	Yes/Yes unbuffered only	• PCI Express ×8 (1.0a), or • PCI-X (with PCIe bridge) not specifically dedicated to graphics	

Summary:

- 845 (Brookdale)
  - two distinct versions 845 MCH for SDR and 845 MCH for DDR
- 875P (Canterwood)
  - Similar to E7205, but adds support for 800 MHz bus, DDR at 400 MHz, Communication Streaming Architecture (CSA), Serial ATA (with RAID in certain configurations) and Performance Acceleration Technology (PAT), a mode purported to cut down memory latency.
  - SMP capability exists only on Xeon-based (socket 604) motherboards using the 875P chipset. FSB is rated at 533 MHz on these motherboards.
- 865PE (Springdale)
  - 875P without PAT, though it was possible to enable PAT in some early revisions. Also lacks ECC Memory support.
  - Sub-versions:
    - 865P – Similar to 865PE, but supports only 400/533 MHz bus and 333 MHz memory.
    - 848P – Single memory channel version of 865PE.
- 865G (Springdale-G)
  - 865PE with integrated graphics (Intel Extreme Graphics 2). PAT never supported in any revisions.
  - Sub-versions:
    - 865GV – 865G without external AGP slot.
- E7221 (Copper River)
  - Designed for Pentium 4-based server.
  - Supports only one physical processor.
  - A basic SVGA controller is integrated for analog video.
  - One PCI-X slot can be bridged to the PCI-e ×8 using the Intel 6702PXH 64-bit PCI Hub.
- E7230 (Mukilteo)
  - Similar to the Intel 3000 MCH, but mainly designed for Pentium D-based server.
  - Supports only one physical processor.
  - DDR2-667 4-4-4 is not supported.
  - No integrated graphics.
  - One PCI-X slot can be bridged to the PCI-e ×8 using Intel 6700PXH 64-bit PCI Hub/Intel 6702PXH 64-bit PCI Hub.

=== Pentium 4-M/Pentium M/Celeron M mobile chipsets ===
Chipset	Code name	Part numbers	sSpec number	South bridge	Release date	Processors	FSB	SMP	Memory types	Max. memory	Parity/ECC	PCI Type	Graphics	TDP
845MZ	Brookdale-MZ	82845 (MCH)	SL64T	ICH3-M	March 2002	Mobile Celeron, Pentium 4-M	400 MT/s	No	DDR 200	1 GB	No/No	v2.2/33 MHz	AGP 4×	
845MP	Brookdale-M	82845 (MCH)	SL66J	ICH3-M	March 2002	Mobile Celeron, Pentium 4-M	400 MT/s	No	DDR 200/266	1 GB	No/No	v2.2/33 MHz	AGP 4×	
852GM	Montara-GM	82852GM (GMCH)	SL6ZK SL7VP	ICH4-M	Q2, '04	Pentium 4-M, Celeron, Celeron M	400 MT/s	No	DDR 200/266	1 GB	No/No	v2.2/33 MHz	Integrated 32-bit 3D Core @ 133 MHz	3.2 W
852GMV	Montara-GM	82852GMV (GMCH)		ICH4-M		Pentium 4-M, Celeron, Celeron M	400 MT/s	No	DDR 200/266	1 GB	No/No	v2.2/33 MHz	Integrated 32-bit 3D Core @ 133 MHz	3.2 W
852PM	Montara-GM	82852PM (MCH)	SL72J SL7VP	ICH4-M		Pentium 4-M, Celeron, Celeron D	400 MT/s 533 MT/s	No	DDR 200/266/333	2 GB	No/No	v2.2/33 MHz	AGP 1x/2×/4×	5.7 W
852GME	Montara-GM	82852GME (GMCH)	SL72K SL8D7	ICH4-M	Q4, '03	Pentium 4-M, Celeron, Celeron D	400 MT/s 533 MT/s	No	DDR 200/266/333	2 GB	No/No	v2.2/33 MHz	Integrated Extreme Graphics 2 graphics core	5.7 W
854		82854 (GMCH)	SL794	ICH4-M	March 2005	Celeron M ULV	400 MT/s	No	DDR 266/333	2 GB	No/No	v2.2/33 MHz	Integrated Extreme Graphics 2 graphics core	5.7 W
855GM	Montara-GM	82855GM (GMCH)	SL6WW SL7VL	ICH4-M	March 2003	Pentium M, Celeron M	400 MT/s	No	DDR 200/266	2 GB	No/No	v2.2/33 MHz	Integrated Extreme Graphics 2 graphics core	3.2 W
855GME	Montara-GM	82855GME (MCH)	SL72L SL7VN	ICH4-M	March 2003	Pentium M, Celeron M	400 MT/s	No	DDR 200/266/333	2 GB	No/No	v2.2/33 MHz	Integrated Extreme Graphics 2 graphics core	4.3 W
855PM	Odem	82855PM (MCH)	SL6TJ (A3) SL752 (B1)	ICH4-M	March 2003	Pentium M, Celeron M	400 MT/s	No	DDR 200/266/333	2 GB	No/No	v2.2/33 MHz	AGP 2×/4×	5.7 W

=== Southbridge 8xx chipsets ===
Chipset	Part number	sSpec number	ATA	SATA	RAID Level	USB	PCI
ICH	82801AA	SL38R SL3MZ SL47Z	UDMA 66/33	No	No	1.1, 2 ports	Rev 2.2, 6 slots
ICH0	82801AB	SL38P SL3N2 (B1)	UDMA 33	No	No	1.1, 2 ports	Rev 2.2, 4 slots
ICH2-M	82801BAM	SL45H (B0) SL4HN (B1) SL4R6 (B2)	UDMA 100/66/33	No	No	1.1, 2 ports	Rev 2.2, 2 slots
ICH2	82801BA	SL45H (B0) SL5FC (B0) SL4HM (B1) SL4YG (B1’) SL59Z (B4) SL5WK (B5) SL7UU (B5) SL5PN (C0)	UDMA 100/66/33	No	No	1.1, 4 ports	Rev 2.2, 6 slots
ICH3-M	82801CAM	SL5LF (B0) SL5YP	UDMA 100/66/33	No	No	1.1, 2 ports	Rev 2.2, 2 slots
ICH3-S	82801CA	SL632 SL8AN (B2)	UDMA 100/66/33	No	No	1.1, 6 ports	Rev 2.2, 6 slots
ICH4-M	82801DBM	SL6DN SL7VK (B2)	UDMA 100/66/33	No	No	2.0, 4 ports	Rev 2.2, 3 slots
ICH4	82801DB	SL66K (A1) SL6DM (B0) SL8DE	UDMA 100/66/33	No	No	2.0, 6 ports	Rev 2.2, 6 slots
ICH5-M	82801EBM		UDMA 100/66/33	No	No	2.0, 4 ports	Rev 2.3, 4 slots
ICH5	82801EB	SL6TN (A2) SL73Z (A3) SL7YC	UDMA 100/66/33	SATA 1.5 Gbit/s, 2 ports	No	2.0, 8 ports	Rev 2.3, 6 slots
ICH5R	82801ER	SL6ZD SL73D (A3) SL742 (A3)	UDMA 100/66/33	SATA 1.5 Gbit/s, 2 ports	RAID 0, RAID 1	2.0, 8 ports	Rev 2.3, 6 slots
6300ESB	6300ESB	SL7XJ	UDMA 100/66/33	SATA 1.5 Gbit/s, 2 ports	RAID 0, RAID 1	2.0, 4 ports	Rev 2.2 4 PCI slots, Rev 1.0 2 PCI-X slots + 2 PCI-X devices

== 9xx chipsets and 3/4 Series chipsets ==
=== Pentium 4/Pentium D/Pentium XE chipsets ===
All chipsets listed in the table below:

- Do not support SMP
- Support (-R and -DH) variants for South Bridges
- Products with PCI Express are Revision 1.0a

Chipset	Code name	Part numbers	sSpec number	South bridge	Release date	Supported processors	FSB [MT/s]	Memory		Parity / ECC	Graphics		TDP [W]
Chipset	Code name	Part numbers	sSpec number	South bridge	Release date	Supported processors	FSB [MT/s]	types	max. [GB]	Parity / ECC	PCIe	integrated core	TDP [W]
910GL	Grantsdale-GL	82910GL (GMCH)	SL7W4 (B1) SL8AR (C2) SL8BV (C2)	ICH6/ICH6R	September 2004	Pentium 4, Celeron, Celeron D	533	DDR 333/400	2	No/No	—N/a	GMA 900	16.3
915GL	Grantsdale-GL	82915GL (GMCH)	SL8CK (C2) SL8CL SL8DC (C2)	ICH6/ICH6R	March 2005	Pentium 4, Celeron D	533/800	DDR 333/400	4	No/No	—N/a	GMA 900	16.3
915PL	Grantsdale-PL	82915PL (MCH)	SL8D6 (C2) SL8DD (C2)	ICH6/ICH6R	March 2005	Pentium 4, Celeron D	533/800	DDR 333/400	2	No/No	×16	—N/a	16.3
915P	Grantsdale	82915P (MCH)	SL7LY (B1) SL8AS (C2) SL8BW (C2)	ICH6/ICH6R	June 2004	Pentium 4, Celeron D	533/800	DDR 333/400, DDR2 400/533	4	No/No	×16	—N/a	16.3
915G	Grantsdale-G	82915G (GMCH)	SL7LX (B1) SL8AT (C2) SL8BU (C2)	ICH6/ICH6R	June 2004	Pentium 4, Celeron D	533/800	DDR 333/400, DDR2 400/533	4	No/No	×16	GMA 900	16.3
915GV	Grantsdale-GV	82915GV (GMCH)	SL7W5 (B1) SL8AU (C2) SL8BT (C2)	ICH6/ICH6R	June 2004	Pentium 4, Celeron D	533/800	DDR 333/400, DDR2 400/533	4	No/No	—N/a	GMA 900	16.3
925X	Alderwood	82925X (MCH)	SL7LZ SL7RC	ICH6/ICH6R	June 2004	Pentium 4, Pentium 4 XE	800	DDR2 400/533	4^{[*]}	Yes/Yes	×16	—N/a	12.3
925XE	Alderwood-XE	82925XE (MCH)	SL84Z	ICH6/ICH6R	November 2004	Pentium 4, Pentium 4 XE	800/1066	DDR2 400/533	4^{[*]}	Yes/Yes	×16	—N/a	13.3
945PL	Lakeport-PL	82945PL (MCH)	SL8V4 (A2) SL93C (A1)	ICH7	March 2006	Pentium 4, Pentium D, Celeron D, (Core 2)^{[1]}	533/800	DDR2 400/533	2^{[*]}	No/No	×16	—N/a	15.2
945P	Lakeport	82945P (MCH)	SL8FV (A1) SL8HT (A2)	ICH7/ICH7R	May 2005	Pentium 4, Pentium D, Celeron D, (Core 2)^{[1]}	533/800/1066	DDR2 400/533/667	4^{[*]}	No/No	×16	—N/a	15.2
945G	Lakeport-G	82945G (GMCH)	SL8FU	ICH7/ICH7R	May 2005	Pentium 4, Pentium D, Celeron D, (Core 2)^{[1]}	533/800/1066	DDR2 400/533/667	4^{[*]}	No/No	×16	GMA 950	22.2
955X	Lakeport-X	82955X (MCH)	SL8FW	ICH7/ICH7R	April 2005	Pentium 4, Pentium 4 XE, Pentium D, Pentium XE	800/1066	DDR2 533/667	8	Yes/Yes	×16	—N/a	13.5

^{[*]} Remapping of PCIE/APIC memory ranges not supported, some physical memory might not be accessible (e.g. limited to 3.5 GB or similar).

^{[1]} Some later revisions of motherboards based on 945P,945G and 945PL chipset usually supports some Core 2 processors (with later BIOSes). Core 2 Quad is not supported. Only Core 2 Duo, Pentium Dual-Core, and Core2 based Celerons.

Summary:

- 915P (Grantsdale)
  - Supports Pentium 4 on an 800 MT/s bus. Uses DDR memory up to 400 MHz, or DDR2 at 533 MHz. Replaces AGP and CSA with PCI Express, and also supports "Matrix RAID", a RAID mode designed to allow the usage of RAID levels 0 and 1 simultaneously with two hard drives. (Normally RAID1+0 would have required four hard drives)
  - Sub-versions:
    - 915PL – Cut-down version of 915P with no support for DDR2 and only supporting 2 GB of memory.
- 915G (Grantsdale-G)
  - 915P with an integrated GMA 900. This core contains Pixel Shader version 2.0 only, it does not contain Vertex Shaders nor does it feature Transform & Lighting (T&L) capabilities and therefore is not Direct X 8.1 or 9.0 compliant.
  - Sub-versions:
    - 915GL – Same feature reductions as 915PL, but supports 4 GB of memory. No support for external graphics cards.
    - 915GV – Same as 915G, but has no way of adding an external graphics card.
    - 910GL – No support for external graphics cards or 800 MT/s bus.
- 925X (Alderwood)
  - Higher end version of 915. Supports another PAT-like mode and ECC memory, and exclusively uses DDR-II RAM.
  - Sub-versions:
    - 925XE – Supports a 1066 MT/s bus.
- 945P (Lakeport)
  - Update on 915P, with support for Serial ATA II, RAID mode 5, an improved memory controller with support for DDR-II at 667 MHz and additional PCI Express lanes. Support for DDR-I is dropped. Formal dual-core support was added to this chipset.
  - Sub-versions:
    - 945PL – No support for 1066 MT/s bus, only supports 2 GB of memory.
- 945G (Lakeport-G)
  - A version of the 945P that has a GMA 950 integrated, supports a 1066 MT/s bus.
  - Sub-versions:
    - 945GC – Same feature reductions as 945PL but with an integrated GMA 950.
    - 945GZ – Same as 945GC but only supports DDR2 memory at 400/533 MT/s. No support for external graphics cards (some boards, like Asus P5GZ-MX, support through ICH7 on PCIe ×16 @4 lanes mode).
- 955X (Lakeport)
  - Update for 925X, with additional features of "Lakeport" (e.g., PAT features and ECC memory), and uses DDR2.

=== Pentium M/Celeron M mobile chipsets ===
- Products with PCI Express are Revision 1.0a

Chipset	Code name	Part numbers	sSpec number	South bridge	Release date	Supported processors	FSB	Memory types	Max. memory	Parity/ECC	PCIe	Graphics	TDP
910GML	Alviso-GM	82910GML (GMCH)	SL89H SL8AE SL8DX SL8G5 (C2) SL8G8 (C2)	ICH6-M	January 2005	Celeron M	400 MT/s	DDR 333/400, DDR2 400	2 GB	No/No	—N/a	Integrated GMA 900	6 W
915GMS	Alviso-GM	82915GMS (GMCH)	SL8B6 SL8B7 SL8G4 (C2) SL8G9 (C2)	ICH6-M	January 2005	Pentium M, Celeron M	400 MT/s	DDR2 400	2 GB	No/No	—N/a	Integrated GMA 900	4.8 W
915GM	Alviso-GM	82915GM (GMCH)	SL87G SL89G SL8DY SL8G2 (C2) SL8G6 (C2)	ICH6-M	January 2005	Pentium M, Celeron M	400/533 MT/s	DDR 333, DDR2 400/533	2 GB	No/No	×16	Integrated GMA 900	6 W
915PM	Alviso	82915PM (MCH)	SL8B4 SL8B5 SL8BR SL8CS SL8G3 (C2) SL8G7 (C2)	ICH6-M	January 2005	Pentium M, Celeron M	400/533 MT/s	DDR 333, DDR2 400/533	2 GB	No/No	×16	—N/a	5.5 W

=== Core/Core 2 mobile chipsets ===
- Products with PCI Express are Revision 1.1

Chipset	Code name	Part numbers	sSpec number	South bridge	Release date	Processors supported (official)	FSB (MT/s)	Memory		PCIe	Graphics		TDP [W]
Chipset	Code name	Part numbers	sSpec number	South bridge	Release date	Processors supported (official)	FSB (MT/s)	types	max. [GB]	PCIe	graphics core	3D render	TDP [W]
940GML	Calistoga	82940GML (GMCH)	SL8Z5	ICH7-M	January 2006	Celeron M	533	DDR2 400/533	2	—N/a	Integrated GMA 950	Max. 166 MHz	7
943GML	Calistoga	82943GML (GMCH)		ICH7-M	January 2006	Celeron M, Core Solo, Pentium Dual-Core (Note: The Intel 82943GML mobile chipset unofficially supports Core Duo, Core 2 Duo, and Pentium Dual Core processors as well as 667 MHz FSB, which is a popular upgrade for many older notebook computers such as certain models of Acer Aspire 3680.)	533	DDR2 400/533	2	—N/a	Integrated GMA 950	Max. 200 MHz	
945GSE	Calistoga	82945GSE (GMCH)	SLB2R	ICH7-M	Q1'06	Intel Atom	533/667	DDR2 400/533	2	—N/a	Integrated GMA 950	Max. 166 MHz	6
945GMS	Calistoga	82945GMS (GMCH)	SL8TC	ICH7-M	January 2006	Core 2 Duo, Core Duo, Pentium Dual-Core, Core Solo, Celeron M	533/667	DDR2 400/533	2	—N/a	Integrated GMA 950	Max. 166 MHz	7
945GM/E	Calistoga	82945GM/E (GMCH)	SL8Z2	ICH7-M/ICH7-M DH	January 2006	Core 2 Duo, Core Duo, Pentium Dual-Core, Core Solo, Celeron M	533/667	DDR2 400/533/667	4 (Note: Remapping of PCIE/APIC memory ranges not supported, some physical memory might not be accessible (e.g. limited to 3.5 GB or similar).)	x16	Integrated GMA 950	Max. 250 MHz	7
945GT	Calistoga	82945GT (GMCH)	SL8Z6	ICH7-M/ICH7-M DH	January 2006	Core 2 Duo, Core Duo, Pentium Dual-Core, Core Solo, Celeron M	533/667	DDR2 400/533/667	4	x16	Integrated GMA 950	Max. 400 MHz	7
945PM	Calistoga	82945PM (MCH)	SL8Z4	ICH7-M/ICH7-M DH	January 2006	Core 2 Duo, Core Duo, Pentium Dual-Core, Core Solo, Celeron M	533/667	DDR2 400/533/667	4	x16	—N/a		7

=== Core 2 chipsets ===
All Core 2 chipsets support the Pentium Dual-Core and Celeron processors based on the Core architecture. Support for all NetBurst based processors was officially dropped starting with the Bearlake chipset family. However, some motherboards still support the older processors.

- Lakeport supports PCI Express 1.0a
- Broadwater and Glenwood supports PCI Express 1.1

Chipset	Code name	Part numbers	sSpec number	South bridge	Release date	Processors	Lithography	VT-d support	FSB (MT/s)	Memory		Parity/ECC	PCIe	iGraphics
Chipset	Code name	Part numbers	sSpec number	South bridge	Release date	Processors	Lithography	VT-d support	FSB (MT/s)	types	max.	Parity/ECC	PCIe	iGraphics
945GC	Lakeport-GC	82945GC (MCH)	SL9ZC (A2) SLA9C (A2) SLB86 (A2)	ICH7/ICH7R/ICH7-DH	May 2005	Pentium 4, Pentium D, Celeron D, Core 2 Duo, Pentium Dual-Core, Atom	130 nm	No	533/800 (last rev.1066)	DDR2 400/533/667	2 GB (some boards supports 4 GB shrunk to 3.27 GB) ^{[*]}	No/No	1x16	GMA 950
945GZ	Lakeport-GZ	82945GZ (GMCH)	SL927 (A2)	ICH7	June 2005	Pentium 4, Pentium D, Celeron D, Core 2 Duo, Pentium Dual-Core	130 nm	No	533/800 (last rev.1066)	DDR2 400/533	4 GB (shrunk to 3.27 GB due to chipset limitation)	No/No	some motherboards have ×16 @×4 from ICH7	GMA 950
946PL	Lakeport-PL	82946PL (MCH)	SL9NV SL9QY	ICH7/ICH7R	July 2006	Pentium 4, Pentium D, Celeron D, Core 2 Duo, Pentium Dual-Core	130 nm	No	533/800 (last rev.1066)	DDR2 533/667	4 GB	No/No	×16	—N/a
946GZ	Lakeport-GZ	82946GZ (GMCH)	SL9NV SL9R4	ICH7/ICH7R	July 2006	Pentium 4, Pentium D, Celeron D, Core 2 Duo, Pentium Dual-Core	130 nm	No	533/800 (last rev.1066)	DDR2 533/667	4 GB	No/No	×16	GMA 3000
P965	Broadwater(P)	82P965 (MCH)	SL9NU SL9QX	ICH8/ICH8R/ICH8-DH	June 2006	Pentium Dual-Core, Core 2 Quad, Core 2 Duo	130 nm	No	533/800/1066	DDR2 533/667/800	8 GB	No/No	×16, ×4	—N/a
G965	Broadwater(GC)	82G965 (GMCH)	SL9P2 SL9R5	ICH8/ICH8R/ICH8-DH	June 2006	Pentium Dual-Core, Core 2 Duo	130 nm	No	533/800/1066	DDR2 533/667/800	8 GB	No/No	×16	GMA X3000
Q965	Broadwater(G)	82Q965 (GMCH)	SL9NW SL9QZ	ICH8/ICH8R/ICH8-DH	June 2006	Pentium Dual-Core, Core 2 Duo	130 nm	No	533/800/1066	DDR2 533/667/800	8 GB	No/No	×16	GMA 3000
Q963	Broadwater(G)	82Q963 (GMCH)	SL9R2	ICH8/ICH8R/ICH8-DH	June 2006	Pentium Dual-Core, Core 2 Duo	130 nm	No	533/800/1066	DDR2 533/667/800	8 GB	No/No	No	GMA 3000
975X	Glenwood	82975X (MCH)	SL8YS	ICH7/ICH7R/ICH7-DH	November 2005	Pentium 4, Pentium 4 EE, Pentium D, Pentium XE, (Celeron D, Core 2 Quad, Core 2 Duo, Pentium Dual-Core)^{2}	130 nm	No	533/800/1066^{2}	DDR2 533/667/800^{3}	8 GB	Yes/Yes	1x16^{1}, 2×8	—N/a
P31	Bearlake (P)	82P31 (MCH)	SLAHX SLASK (B0)	ICH7	August 2007	Pentium Dual-Core, Core 2 Duo, Core 2 Quad	90 nm	No	800/1066/1333 (P45 unofficial 1600)	DDR2 667/800	4 GB	No/No	1×16 rev. 1.1	—N/a
G31	Bearlake (G)	82G31 (GMCH)	SLASJ (B0) SLAJ3 (A2)	ICH7	August 2007	Pentium Dual-Core, Core 2 Duo, Core 2 Quad	90 nm	No	800/1066/1333 (P45 unofficial 1600)	DDR2 667/800	4 GB	No/No	1×16 rev. 1.1	GMA 3100
G33	Bearlake (G+)	82G33 (GMCH)	SLA9Q (A2)	ICH9/ICH9R/ICH9-DH	June 2007	Pentium Dual-Core, Core 2 Duo, Core 2 Quad	90 nm	No	800/1066/1333 (P45 unofficial 1600)	DDR2 667/800; DDR3 800/1066	8 GB; 4 GB	No/No	1×16 rev. 1.1	GMA 3100
P35	Bearlake (P+)	82P35 (MCH)	SLA9R (A2)	ICH9/ICH9R/ICH9-DH	June 2007	Pentium Dual-Core, Core 2 Duo, Core 2 Quad	90 nm	No	800/1066/1333 (P45 unofficial 1600)	DDR2 667/800; DDR3 800/1066	8 GB	No/No	1×16, 1x4 rev. 1.1	—N/a
G35	Bearlake	82G35 (GMCH)	SLAJJ	ICH9/ICH9R/ICH9-DH	August 2007	Pentium Dual-Core, Core 2 Duo, Core 2 Quad	90 nm	No	800/1066/1333 (P45 unofficial 1600)	DDR2 667/800	8 GB	No/No	1×16 rev. 1.1	GMA X3500
Q33	Bearlake (QF)	82Q33 (GMCH)	SLAEW (A2)	ICH9/ICH9R	June 2007	Pentium Dual-Core, Core 2 Duo, Core 2 Quad	90 nm	No	800/1066/1333 (P45 unofficial 1600)	DDR2 667/800	8 GB	No/No	1×16 rev. 1.1	GMA 3100
Q35	Bearlake (Q)	82Q35 (GMCH)	SLAEX	ICH9/ICH9R/ICH9-DO	June 2007	Pentium Dual-Core, Core 2 Duo, Core 2 Quad	90 nm	Yes^{4}	800/1066/1333 (P45 unofficial 1600)	DDR2 667/800	8 GB	No/No	1×16 rev. 1.1	GMA 3100
G41	Eaglelake (G)	82G41 (GMCH)	SLB8D SLGQ3	ICH7	September 2008	Core 2 Duo, Core 2 Quad	65 nm	No	800/1066/1333 (P45 unofficial 1600)	DDR2 667/800; DDR3 800/1066	4 GB; 8 GB	No/No	1×16 rev. 1.1	GMA X4500
B43	Eaglelake (B)	82B43 (GMCH)	SLGL7 (A3)	ICH10D	December 2008	Core 2 Duo, Core 2 Quad	65 nm	No	800/1066/1333 (P45 unofficial 1600)	DDR2 667/800; DDR3 800/1066	16 GB	No/No	1×16 rev. 2.0	GMA 4500
P43	Eaglelake (P)	82P43 (MCH)	SLB89	ICH10/ICH10R	June 2008	Core 2 Duo, Core 2 Quad	65 nm	No	800/1066/1333 (P45 unofficial 1600)	DDR2 667/800; DDR3 800/1066	8 GB; 16 GB	No/No	1×16 rev. 2.0	—N/a
P45	Eaglelake (P+)	82P45 (MCH)	SLB7Z (A1) SLB8C (A2)	ICH10/ICH10R	June 2008	Core 2 Duo, Core 2 Quad	65 nm	No	800/1066/1333 (P45 unofficial 1600)	DDR2 667/800; DDR3 800/1066	8 GB; 16 GB	No/No	1×16, 2×8 rev. 2.0	—N/a
G43	Eaglelake (G)	82G43 (GMCH)	SLB85 (A3) SLGQ2 (A3)	ICH10/ICH10R	June 2008	Core 2 Duo, Core 2 Quad	65 nm	No	800/1066/1333 (P45 unofficial 1600)	DDR2 667/800; DDR3 800/1066	8 GB; 16 GB	No/No	1x16 rev. 2.0	GMA X4500
G45	Eaglelake (G+)	82G45 (GMCH)	SLB84	ICH10/ICH10R	June 2008	Core 2 Duo, Core 2 Quad	65 nm	No	800/1066/1333 (P45 unofficial 1600)	DDR2 667/800; DDR3 800/1066	8 GB; 16 GB	No/No	1x16 rev. 2.0	GMA X4500HD
Q43	Eaglelake (Q)	82Q43 (GMCH)	SLB88 (A3)	ICH10/ICH10R/ICH10D	August 2008	Core 2 Duo, Core 2 Quad	65 nm	No	800/1066/1333 (P45 unofficial 1600)	DDR2 667/800; DDR3 800/1066	8 GB; 16 GB	No/No	1x16 rev. 2.0	GMA 4500
Q45	Eaglelake (Q)	82Q45 (GMCH)	SLB8A	ICH10/ICH10R/ICH10-DO	August 2008	Core 2 Duo, Core 2 Quad	65 nm	Yes^{4}	800/1066/1333 (P45 unofficial 1600)	DDR2 667/800; DDR3 800/1066	8 GB; 16 GB	No/No	1x16 rev. 2.0	GMA 4500
X38	Bearlake (X)	82X38 (MCH)	SLALJ (A1)	ICH9/ICH9R/ICH9-DH	September 2007	Core 2 Duo, Core 2 Quad, Core 2 Extreme	90 nm	Yes^{4}	800/1066/1333 (P45 unofficial 1600)	DDR3 800/1066/1333; DDR2 667/800/1066	8 GB; 16 GB	No/DDR2 only	2×16 rev. 2.0	—N/a
X48	Bearlake (X)	82X48 (MCH)	SLASF (A1)	ICH9/ICH9R/ICH9-DH	March 2008	Core 2 Duo, Core 2 Quad, Core 2 Extreme	90 nm	Yes^{4}	800/1066/1333/1600	DDR3 800/1066/1333; DDR2 667/800/1066	8 GB; 16 GB	No/DDR2 only	2×16 rev. 2.0	—N/a

^{[*]} Remapping of PCIE/APIC memory ranges not supported, some physical memory might not be accessible (e.g. limited to 3.5 GB or similar). Operational configuration is 4 ranks – 2× 2 GB dual rank modules or 4× 1 GB single rank modules – depends on number of motherboard DDR2 slots.

Summary:

- 946PL (Lakeport)
  - Update on 945PL, supports 4 GB of memory.
- 946GZ (Lakeport-G)
  - A version of 946PL with GMA 3000 graphics core.
- P965 (Broadwater)
  - Update on 945P, no native PATA support, improved memory controller with support for DDR2 memory up to 800 MHz and official Core 2 Duo support.
- G965 (BroadwaterG)
  - A version of P965 that has a GMA X3000 integrated graphics core.
- Q965 (Broadwater)
  - Expected G965 intended for Intel's vPro office computing brand, with GMA 3000 graphics instead of GMA X3000 graphics. Supports an ADD2 card to add a second display.
  - Sub-versions:
    - Q963 – Q965 without an external graphics interface or support for ADD2.
- 975X (Glenwood)
  - Update of 955, with support for ATI Crossfire Dual Graphics systems and 65 nm processors, including Core 2 Duo.
- P35 (Bearlake)
  - The P35 chipset provides updated support for the new Core 2 Duo E6550, E6750, E6800, and E6850. Processors with a number ending in "50" have a 1333 MT/s FSB. Support for all NetBurst based processors is dropped with this chipset.
- G33 (BearlakeG)
  - A version of P35 with a GMA 3100 integrated graphics core and uses an ICH9 South Bridge.
  - Sub-versions:
    - G35 – G33 with a GMA x3500 integrated graphics core and uses an ICH8 South Bridge, no DDR3 support.
- Q35 (BearlakeG)
  - Expected G33 intended for Intel's vPro office computing brand, no DDR3 Support.
  - Sub-versions:
    - Q33 – Q35 without vPro support.
- P31 (BearlakeG)
  - A version of P35 with an ICH7 South Bridge, supports only 4 GB of DDR2 memory and does not support DDR3 memory.
  - Operational configuration is 4 ranks – 2× 2 GB dual rank modules or 4 × 1 GB single rank modules – depends on number of motherboard DDR2 slots. 4GBs modules are not supported.
- G31 (BearlakeG)
  - A version of P31 with a GMA 3100 integrated graphics core. It supports a 1333 MT/s FSB with Core 2 Duo processors, but Core 2 Quad processors are only supported up to 1066 MT/s.
- G41 (EaglelakeG)
  - Update of G31 with a GMA X4500 integrated graphics core and DDR3 800/1066 support.
- P45 (Eaglelake)
  - Update of P35, with PCIe 2.0 support, Hardware Virtualization, Extreme Memory Profile (XMP) and support for ATI Crossfire (x8+x8).
  - Sub-versions:
    - P43 – P45 without Crossfire support.
- G45 (EaglelakeG)
  - A version of P45 that has a GMA X4500HD integrated graphics core and lacks Crossfire support.
  - Sub-versions:
    - G43 – Same feature reductions as P43, but with a GMA X4500 integrated graphics core.
- Q45 (EaglelakeQ)
  - Expected G43 intended for Intel's vPro office computing brand. Also supports Hardware Virtualization Technology and Intel Trusted Platform Module 1.2 feature.
  - Sub-versions:
    - Q43 – Q45 without vPro support. Also lacks Intel Trusted Platform Module 1.2 support.
    - B43 – Q43 with an ICH10D South Bridge.

^{[1]} The 975X chipset supports only ×16 PCI Express (electrically) in the top slot when the slot below it is unpopulated. Otherwise it and the lower slot (both attached to the Memory Controller Hub) operate at ×8 electrically.

^{[2]} Only later revisions of the 975X chipset boards support Core 2 processors. See MSI 975X Platinum (MS-7246) rev 1.0 (first release), and MSI 975X Platinum Powerup revision (MS-7246) rev 2.1 (released autumn 2006) as example. source: https://web.archive.org/web/20210515170458/http://ixbtlabs.com/articles2/mainboard/msi-975x-platinum-powerup-edition-i975x.html
Officially 975X supports a maximum of 1066 MT/s FSB. Unofficially, third-party motherboards (Asus, Gigabyte) support certain 1333FSB 45 nm Core2 processors, usually with later BIOS updates.
As for Celeron and Celeron D support, some boards and revisions support it, some not. (see upper example, MSI Powerup Edition has reintroduced back Celeron support, probably due to later released Core2-based Celerons, which were often more powerful than higher clocked Netburst Pentiums 4.

^{[3]} The 975X chipset technical specification shows only DDR2-533/667 memory support. Actual implementations of 975X do support DDR2 800.

^{[4]} VT-d is inherently supported on these chipsets, but may not be enabled by individual OEMs. Always read the motherboard manual and check for BIOS updates. X38/X48 VT-d support is limited to certain Intel, Supermicro, DFI (LanParty) and Tyan boards. VT-d is broken or non existent on some boards until the BIOS is updated. Note that VT-d is a chipset Memory Controller Hub technology, not a processor feature, but this is complicated by later processor generations (Core i3/i5/i7) moving the MCH from the motherboard to the processor package, making only certain I series CPUs support VT-d.

=== Core 2 mobile chipsets ===
Chipset	Code name	Part numbers	sSpec number	South bridge	Release date	Lithography	Processors supported (official)	FSB [MT/s]	Memory		Graphics		TDP [W]
Chipset	Code name	Part numbers	sSpec number	South bridge	Release date	Lithography	Processors supported (official)	FSB [MT/s]	types.	max. [GB]	graphics core	3D render	TDP [W]
GL960	Crestline	82960GL (GMCH)	SLA5V (C0)	ICH8-M / ICH8-ME	May 2007	?? nm	Celeron M, Pentium Dual-Core	533	DDR2 533/667	3/5^{1}	Integrated GMA X3100	Max. 400 MHz	13.5
GM965	Crestline	82965GM (GMCH)	SLA9F (C0)	ICH8-M / ICH8-ME	May 2007	?? nm	Core 2 Duo	533/667/800	DDR2 533/667	4/8^{2}	Integrated GMA X3100	Max. 500 MHz	13.5
PM965	Crestline	82965PM (MCH)	SLA5U (C0)	ICH8-M / ICH8-ME	May 2007	?? nm	Core 2 Duo	533/667/800	DDR2 533/667	4/8^{2}	PCIe ×16		8
GL40	Cantiga	82GL40 (GMCH)	SLB95 (B3) SLGGM (A1)	ICH9-M	July 2008	65 nm	Core 2 Duo, Celeron, Celeron M, Pentium Dual-Core	667/800	DDR2 667/800, DDR3 800/1066	4/8^{2}	Integrated GMA X4500MHD	Max. 400 MHz	12
GS40	Cantiga	82GS40 (GMCH)	SLGT8 (B3)	ICH9-M	July 2008	65 nm	Core 2 Duo, Celeron, Celeron M?, Pentium Dual-Core	667/800	DDR2 667/800, DDR3 800/1066	4	Integrated GMA X4500MHD	Max. 400 MHz	12
GS45	Cantiga	82GS45 (GMCH) (For CULV)	SLB92 (B3)	ICH9-M	July 2008	65 nm	Core 2 Solo, Core 2 Duo, Core 2 Extreme, Celeron M	800/1066	DDR2 667/800, DDR3 800/1066	8	Integrated GMA X4500MHD	Max. 533 MHz	7/8/12^{3}
GM45	Cantiga	82GM45 (GMCH)	SLB94 (B3) SLGGN (A1)	ICH9-M	July 2008	65 nm	Core 2 Duo, Core 2 Extreme, Celeron M	667/800/1066	DDR2 667/800, DDR3 800/1066	8	Integrated GMA X4500MHD	Max. 533 MHz	12
PM45	Cantiga	82PM45 (MCH)	SLB97 (B3) SLGGN (A1)	ICH9-M	July 2008	65 nm	Core 2 Duo, Core 2 Quad, Core 2 Extreme	667/800/1066	DDR2 667/800, DDR3 800/1066	8	PCIe ×16		7

- ^{1} Unofficially this chipset support 5 GB.
- ^{2} Officially only 4 GB is supported. Unofficially many laptops with this chipset support 8 GB.
- ^{3} Low power mode, HD playback mode and Full performance mode respectively.

=== Southbridge 9xx and 3/4 Series chipsets ===
Chipset	Part number	sSpec number	Parallel ATA	Serial ATA		AHCI support	RAID levels	USB	TDP [W]
Chipset	Part number	sSpec number	Parallel ATA	3.0 Gbit/s	1.5 Gbit/s	AHCI support	RAID levels	v2.0	TDP [W]
ICH6-M	82801FBM	SL7W6 (B2) SL89K (B2)	UDMA 100/66/33	—N/a	2 ports	Yes	None	4 ports	3.8
ICH6	82801FB	SL7AG (B1) SL7Y5 (B2) SL89L (B2) SL8BZ (C0)	UDMA 100/66/33	—N/a	4 ports	No	None	8 ports	3.8
ICH6R	82801FR	SL79N (B1) SL7W7 (B2) SL89J (B2) SL8C2 (C0)	UDMA 100/66/33	—N/a	4 ports	Yes	0, 1, Matrix	8 ports	3.8
ICH7-M	82801GBM	SL8YB (B0)	UDMA 100/66/33	—N/a	2 ports	Yes	None	4 ports	3.3
ICH7-M DH	82801GHM	SL8YR (B0)	UDMA 100/66/33	4 ports	—N/a	Yes	0, 1, Matrix	4 ports	3.3
ICH7	82801GB	SL8FX (A1) SLGSP	UDMA 100/66/33	4 ports	—N/a	No	None	8 ports	3.3
ICH7DH	82801GDH	SL8UK (A1)	UDMA 100/66/33	4 ports	—N/a	Yes	0, 1, Matrix	8 ports	3.3
ICH7R	82801GR	SL8FY (A1) SL8KL (A1)	UDMA 100/66/33	4 ports	—N/a	Yes	0, 1, 5, 10, Matrix	8 ports	3.3
ICH8M	82801HBM	SLA5Q (B1) SLB9A (B2) SLJ4Y (B2)	UDMA 100/66/33	3 ports	—N/a	Yes	None	10 ports	2.4
ICH8M-E	82801HEM	SLA5R (B1) SLB9B (B2)	UDMA 100/66/33	3 ports	—N/a	Yes	0, 1, Matrix	10 ports	2.4
ICH8	82801HB	SL9MN (B0)	No	4 ports	—N/a	No	None	10 ports	3.7
ICH8R	82801HR	SL9MK (B0)	No	6 ports	—N/a	Yes	0, 1, 5, 10, Matrix	10 ports	3.7
ICH8DH	82801HH	SL9ML (B0)	No	6 ports	—N/a	Yes	0, 1, 5, 10, Matrix	10 ports	3.7
ICH8DO	82801HO	SL9MM (B0)	No	6 ports	—N/a	Yes	0, 1, 5, 10, Matrix	10 ports	3.7
ICH9M	82801IBM	SLB8Q (A3)	No	4 ports	—N/a	Yes	None	8 ports	2.5
ICH9M-E	82801IEM	SLB8P (A3)	No	4 ports	—N/a	Yes	0, 1, Matrix	8 ports	2.5
ICH9	82801IB	SLA9M (A2)	No	4 ports	—N/a	No(Yes)	None	12 ports	4.3
ICH9R	82801IR	SLA9N (A2) SLAXE (A2)	No	6 ports	—N/a	Yes	0, 1, 5, 10, Matrix	12 ports	4.3
ICH9DH	82801IH	SLA9P (A2)	No	6 ports	—N/a	Yes	0, 1, 5, 10, Matrix	12 ports	4.3
ICH9DO	82801IO	SLAFD (A2)	No	6 ports	—N/a	Yes	0, 1, 5, 10, Matrix	12 ports	4.3
ICH10	82801JB	SLB8R (A0)	No	6 ports	—N/a	Yes	None	12 ports	4.5
ICH10D	82801JH	SLG8T (B0)	No	6 ports	—N/a	Yes	None	12 ports	4.5
ICH10R	82801JR	SLB8S (A0)	No	6 ports	—N/a	Yes	0, 1, 5, 10, Matrix	12 ports	4.5
ICH10DO	82801JO		No	6 ports	—N/a	Yes	0, 1, 5, 10, Matrix	12 ports	4.5

== 5/6/7/8/9 Series chipsets ==
The Nehalem microarchitecture moves the memory controller into the processor. For high-end Nehalem processors, the X58 IOH acts as a bridge from the QPI to PCI Express peripherals and DMI to the ICH10 southbridge. For mainstream and lower-end Nehalem processors, the integrated memory controller (IMC) is an entire northbridge (some even having GPUs), and the PCH (Platform Controller Hub) acts as a southbridge.

=== LGA 1156 ===
Chipsets supporting LGA 1156 CPUs (Lynnfield and Clarkdale).

Not listed below is the 3450 chipset (see Xeon chipsets) which is compatible with Nehalem mainstream and high-end processors but does not claim core iX-compatibility. With either a Core i5 or i3 processor, the 3400-series chipsets enable the ECC functionality of UDIMM ECC memory. Otherwise these chipsets do not enable unbuffered ECC functionality.

Chipset	Code name	sSpec number	Part numbers	Release date	Bus interface	Link speed	PCI Express lanes	PCI	SATA	USB	FDI support	TDP
Chipset	Code name	sSpec number	Part numbers	Release date	Bus interface	Link speed	PCI Express lanes	PCI	3 Gbit/s	v2.0	FDI support	TDP
H55	Ibex Peak	SLGZX(B3)	BD82H55 (PCH)	Jan 2010	DMI 1.0	1 GB/s	6 PCIe 2.0 at 2.5 GT/s	Yes	6 ports	12 ports	Yes	5.2 W
P55	Ibex Peak	SLH24 (B3), SLGWV (B2)	BD82P55 (PCH)	Sep 2009	DMI 1.0	1 GB/s	8 PCIe 2.0 at 2.5 GT/s	Yes	6 ports	14 ports	No	4.7 W
H57	Ibex Peak	SLGZL(B3)	BD82H57 (PCH)	Jan 2010	DMI 1.0	1 GB/s	8 PCIe 2.0 at 2.5 GT/s	Yes	6 ports	14 ports	Yes	5.2 W
Q57	Ibex Peak	SLGZW(B3)	BD82Q57 (PCH)	Jan 2010	DMI 1.0	1 GB/s	8 PCIe 2.0 at 2.5 GT/s	Yes	6 ports	14 ports	Yes	5.1 W

=== LGA 1155 ===
Chipsets supporting LGA 1155 CPUs (Sandy Bridge and Ivy Bridge). The PCIe 2.0 lanes from the PCH ran at 5 GT/s in this series, unlike in the previous LGA 1156 chips.

The Cougar Point Intel 6 series chipsets with stepping B2 were recalled due to a hardware bug that causes their 3 Gbit/s Serial ATA to degrade over time until they become unusable. Stepping B3 of the Intel 6 series chipsets will have the fix for this. The Z68 chipset which supports CPU overclocking and use of the integrated graphics does not have this hardware bug, however all other ones with B2 did. The Z68 also added support for transparently caching hard disk data on to solid-state drives (up to 64 GB), a technology called Smart Response Technology.

Chipset	Code name	sSpec number	Part numbers	Release date	Bus interface	Link speed	PCI Express lanes	PCI	SATA		USB		FDI support	TDP
Chipset	Code name	sSpec number	Part numbers	Release date	Bus interface	Link speed	PCI Express lanes	PCI	6 Gbit/s	3 Gbit/s	v3.2 Gen 1x1	v2.0	FDI support	TDP
H61^{1}	Cougar Point	SLH83(B2); SLJ4B(B3)	BD82H61 (PCH)	February 20, 2011	DMI 2.0	2 GB/s	6 PCIe 2.0	No	None	4 ports	None	10 ports	Yes	6.1 W
B65^{1}	Cougar Point	SLH98(B2); SLJ4A(B3)	BD82B65 (PCH)	February 25, 2011	DMI 2.0	2 GB/s	8 PCIe 2.0	Yes	1 port	5 ports	None	12 ports	Yes	6.1 W
Q65^{1}	Cougar Point	SLH99(B2); SLJ4E(B3)	BD82Q65 (PCH)	Q2 2011	DMI 2.0	2 GB/s	8 PCIe 2.0	Yes	1 port	5 ports	None	14 ports	Yes	6.1 W
P67^{1}	Cougar Point	SLH84(B2) (Recalled); SLJ4C (B3)	BD82P67 (PCH)	January 9, 2011	DMI 2.0	2 GB/s	8 PCIe 2.0	No	2 ports	4 ports	None	14 ports	No	6.1 W
H67^{1}	Cougar Point	SLH82(B2) (Recalled); SLJ49 (B3)	BD82H67 (PCH)	January 9, 2011	DMI 2.0	2 GB/s	8 PCIe 2.0	No	2 ports	4 ports	None	14 ports	Yes	6.1 W
Q67^{1}	Cougar Point	SLH85(B2); SLJ4D(B3)	BD82Q67 (PCH)	February 20, 2011	DMI 2.0	2 GB/s	8 PCIe 2.0	Yes	2 ports	4 ports	None	14 ports	Yes	6.1 W
Z68^{1}	Cougar Point	SLJ4F(B3)	BD82Z68 (PCH)	May 11, 2011	DMI 2.0	2 GB/s	8 PCIe 2.0	No	2 ports	4 ports	None	14 ports	Yes	6.1 W
B75^{2}	Panther Point	SLJ85(C1)	BD82B75 (PCH)	May 13, 2012	DMI 2.0	2 GB/s	8 PCIe 2.0	Yes	1 port	5 ports	4 ports	8 ports	Yes	6.7 W
Q75^{2}	Panther Point	SLJ84(C1)	BD82Q75 (PCH)	May 13, 2012	DMI 2.0	2 GB/s	8 PCIe 2.0	Yes	1 port	5 ports	4 ports	10 ports	Yes	6.7 W
Z75^{2}	Panther Point	SLJ87(C1)	BD82Z75 (PCH)	April 8, 2012	DMI 2.0	2 GB/s	8 PCIe 2.0	No	2 ports	4 ports	4 ports	10 ports	Yes	6.7 W
H77^{2}	Panther Point	SLJ88(C1)	BD82H77 (PCH)	April 8, 2012	DMI 2.0	2 GB/s	8 PCIe 2.0	No	2 ports	4 ports	4 ports	10 ports	Yes	6.7 W
Q77^{2}	Panther Point	SLJ83(C1)	BD82Q77 (PCH)	May 13, 2012	DMI 2.0	2 GB/s	8 PCIe 2.0	Yes	2 ports	4 ports	4 ports	10 ports	Yes	6.7 W
Z77^{2}	Panther Point	SLJC7(C1)	BD82Z77 (PCH)	April 8, 2012	DMI 2.0	2 GB/s	8 PCIe 2.0	No	2 ports	4 ports	4 ports	10 ports	Yes	6.7 W

- ^{1} For Sandy Bridge mainstream desktop and business platforms. Sandy Bridge CPUs provide 16 PCIe 2.0 lanes for direct GPU connectivity.
- ^{2} For Ivy Bridge mainstream desktop platform. Ivy Bridge CPUs provide 16 PCIe 3.0 lanes for direct GPU connectivity and additional 4 PCIe 2.0 lanes.

=== LGA 1150 ===
Chipsets that support LGA 1150 CPUs are listed below. Haswell and Haswell Refresh CPUs are supported by all listed chipsets; however, a BIOS update is usually required for 8-Series Lynx Point motherboards to support Haswell Refresh CPUs. Broadwell CPUs are supported only by 9-Series chipsets, which are usually referred to as Wildcat Point.

The C1 stepping of the Lynx Point chipset contains a bug – a system could lose connectivity with USB devices plugged into USB 3.0 ports provided by the chipset if the system enters the S3 sleep mode.

Chipset	Code name	sSpec number	Part numbers	Release date	Bus interface	Link speed	PCI Express lanes	VT-d support	PCI	SATA		USB		FDI support	TDP	PCIe M.2 support
Chipset	Code name	sSpec number	Part numbers	Release date	Bus interface	Link speed	PCI Express lanes	VT-d support	PCI	6 Gbit/s	3 Gbit/s	v3.2 Gen 1x1	v2.0	FDI support	TDP	PCIe M.2 support
H81	Lynx Point	SR13B(C1); SR177(C2)	DH82H81 (PCH)	June 2013	DMI 2.0	2 GB/s	6 PCIe 2.0	No	No	2 ports	2 ports	2 ports	8 ports	Yes	4.1 W	No
B85	Lynx Point	SR13C(C1); SR178(C2)	DH82B85 (PCH)	June 2013	DMI 2.0	2 GB/s	8 PCIe 2.0	No	No	4 ports	2 ports	4 ports	8 ports	Yes	4.1 W	No
Q85	Lynx Point	SR138(C1); SR174(C2)	DH82Q85 (PCH)	June 2013	DMI 2.0	2 GB/s	8 PCIe 2.0	No	No	4 ports	2 ports	6 ports	8 ports	Yes	4.1 W	No
Q87	Lynx Point	SR137(C1); SR173(C2); SR19E(C2)	DH82Q87 (PCH)	June 2013	DMI 2.0	2 GB/s	8 PCIe 2.0	Yes	No	6 ports	None	6 ports	8 ports	Yes	4.1 W	No
H87	Lynx Point	SR139(C1); SR175(C2)	DH82H87 (PCH)	June 2013	DMI 2.0	2 GB/s	8 PCIe 2.0	No	No	6 ports	None	6 ports	8 ports	Yes	4.1 W	No
Z87	Lynx Point	SR13A(C1); SR176(C2)	DH82Z87 (PCH)	June 2013	DMI 2.0	2 GB/s	8 PCIe 2.0	No	No	6 ports	None	6 ports	8 ports	Yes	4.1 W	No
Z97	Wildcat Point	SR1JJ(A0)	DH82Z97 (PCH)	May 2014	DMI 2.0	2 GB/s	8 PCIe 2.0	No	No	6 ports	None	6 ports	8 ports	Yes	4.1 W	Yes
H97	Wildcat Point	SR1JK(A0)	DH82H97 (PCH)	May 2014	DMI 2.0	2 GB/s	8 PCIe 2.0	No	No	6 ports	None	6 ports	8 ports	Yes	4.1 W	Yes

=== LGA 1366, LGA 2011, and LGA 2011-v3 ===
Single socket chipsets supporting LGA 1366, LGA 2011, and LGA 2011-v3 CPUs. Please consult List of Intel Xeon chipsets for further, multi-socket, chipsets for these sockets.

Chipset	Code name	sSpec number	Part numbers	Release date	Socket	Bus interface	Link speed (Note: Aggregated speed for both directions)	PCI Express lanes	VT-d support	PCI	SATA		USB		FDI support	TDP
Chipset	Code name	sSpec number	Part numbers	Release date	Socket	Bus interface	Link speed	PCI Express lanes	VT-d support	PCI	6 Gbit/s	3 Gbit/s	v3.2 Gen 1x1	v2.0	FDI support	TDP
X58 (I/O hub)^{1}	Tylersburg	SLGBT (B2), SLGMX (B3), SLH3M (C2)	AC82X58 (IOH)	November 2008	LGA 1366	QPI	Up to 25.6 GB/s	36 PCIe 2.0 at 5 GT/s (IOH); 6 PCIe 1.1 (ICH)	Yes	Yes	None	6 ports	None	12 ports	No	28.6 W^{2}
X79^{3}	Patsburg	SLJHW (C0), SLJN7 (C1)	BD82X79 (PCH)	November 14, 2011	LGA 2011	DMI 2.0	32 GB/s	40 PCIe 3.0	Yes	Yes	2 ports	4 ports	None	14 ports	No	7.8 W
X99^{4}	Wellsburg	SLKDE (B1), SLKM9 (B1)	DH82031PCH (PCH)	August 29, 2014	LGA 2011-v3	DMI 2.0	32 GB/s	40 PCIe 3.0	Yes	No	10 ports	None	6 ports	8 ports	No	6.5 W

- ^{1} X58 South Bridge is ICH10/ICH10R.
- ^{2} X58 TDP includes the X58 IOH TDP in addition to the ICH10/ICH10R TDP.
- ^{3} For Sandy Bridge enthusiast desktop platform. Sandy Bridge CPUs will provide up to 40 PCIe 3.0 lanes for direct GPU connectivity and additional 4 PCIe 2.0 lanes. NOTE : This reference number 4 is on X79, which is a Sandy bridge -E, not Sandy Bridge, and PCIe 3.0 only is enabled when an Ivy Bridge-E CPU or Xeon E-5 series is used.
- ^{4} For Haswell enthusiast desktop platform. Haswell CPUs will provide up to 40 PCIe 3.0 lanes for direct GPU connectivity and additional 4 PCIe 2.0 lanes.

=== LGA 2066 ===
Chipsets supporting LGA 2066 socket for Skylake-X processors and Kaby Lake-X processors.

The C621 Chipset also supports LGA 3647 socket for Skylake-SP as well as Cascade Lake-W and Cascade Lake-SP processors.

Chipset	Code name	sSpec number	Part numbers	Release date	Bus interface	Link speed	PCI Express lanes	SATA	SATAe	PCIe M.2	QAT	USB ports		TDP
Chipset	Code name	sSpec number	Part numbers	Release date	Bus interface	Link speed	PCI Express lanes	6 Gbit/s	SATAe	PCIe M.2	QAT	v3.0	v2.0	TDP
X299	Basin Falls	SR2Z2(A0)	GL82X299	May 30, 2017	DMI 3.0	32 GB/s	16 PCIe 3.0 (for i5), 28–44 PCIe 3.0 (i7), 48 PCIe 3.0 (i9)	?	?	Yes (VROC)	Up to 10	Up to 14	?	6 W
C422	Kaby Lake	SR2WG(A0)	GL82C422	July 11, 2017	DMI 3.0	32 GB/s	16 PCIe 3.0 (for i5), 28–44 PCIe 3.0 (i7), 48 PCIe 3.0 (i9)	24 PCIe 3.0	?	Yes (VROC)	Up to 10	Up to 14	?	6 W
C621	Lewisburg	SR36S(B1); SR354(S0); SR3HE(B2); SR3HL(S1)	EY82C621x	July 11, 2017	UPI	32 GB/s	48 PCIe 3.0	Up to 14	?	Yes (VROC)	Up to 10	Up to 14	?	15 W
C622	Lewisburg	SR36X(S0); SR3HK(S1)	EY82C622	July 11, 2017	UPI	32 GB/s	48 PCIe 3.0	Up to 14	?	Yes (VROC)	Up to 10	Up to 14	?	17 W
C624	Lewisburg	SR36Y(S0); SR3HM(S1)	EY82C624	July 11, 2017	UPI	32 GB/s	48 PCIe 3.0	Up to 14	?	Yes (VROC)	Up to 10	Up to 14	?	19 W
C625	Lewisburg	SR36W(B1); SR3HJ(B2)	EY82C625	July 11, 2017	UPI	32 GB/s	48 PCIe 3.0	Up to 14	?	Yes (20 lanes)	Up to 10	Up to 14	?	21 W
C626	Lewisburg	SR36V(B1); SR3HH(B2)	EY82C626	July 11, 2017	UPI	32 GB/s	48 PCIe 3.0	Up to 14	?	Yes (20 lanes)	Up to 10	Up to 14	?	23 W
C627	Lewisburg	SR36U(B1); SR3HG(B2)	EY82C627	July 11, 2017	UPI	32 GB/s	48 PCIe 3.0	Up to 14	?	Yes (20 lanes)	Up to 10	Up to 14	?	28.6 W
C628	Lewisburg	SR36T(B1); SR3HF(B2)	EY82C628	July 11, 2017	UPI	32 GB/s	48 PCIe 3.0	Up to 14	?	Yes (20 lanes)	Up to 10	Up to 14	?	26.3 W

=== Dedicated mobile chipsets ===
All Core-i series mobile chipsets have an integrated south bridge.

Chipset	Code name	sSpec number	Part numbers	Release date	Process support	Bus interface	Link speed	PCI Express lanes	VT-d support	SATA		USB		FDI support	TDP
Chipset	Code name	sSpec number	Part numbers	Release date	Process support	Bus interface	Link speed	PCI Express lanes	VT-d support	6 Gbit/s	3 Gbit/s	v3.2 Gen 1x1	v2.0	FDI support	TDP
PM55	Ibex Peak-M	SLGWN(B2), SLH23(B3), SLGWP	BD82PM55 (PCH)	September 2009	45 nm, 32 nm	DMI	1 GB/s	8 PCIe 2.0	Yes	None	6 ports	None	14 ports	No	3.5 W
HM55	Ibex Peak-M	SLGZS(B3)	BD82HM55 (PCH)	January 2010	45 nm, 32 nm	DMI	1 GB/s	6 PCIe 2.0	Yes	None	4 ports	None	12 ports	Yes	3.5 W
HM57	Ibex Peak-M	SLGZR(B3)	BD82HM57 (PCH)	January 2010	45 nm, 32 nm	DMI	1 GB/s	8 PCIe 2.0	Yes	None	6 ports	None	14 ports	Yes	3.5 W
QM57	Ibex Peak-M	SLGZQ(B3)	BD82QM57 (PCH)	January 2010	45 nm, 32 nm	DMI	1 GB/s	8 PCIe 2.0	Yes	None	6 ports	None	14 ports	Yes	3.5 W
QS57	Ibex Peak-M	SLGZV(B3)	BD82QS57 (PCH)	January 2010	45 nm, 32 nm	DMI	1 GB/s	8 PCIe 2.0	Yes	None	6 ports	None	14 ports	Yes	3.4 W
HM65	Cougar Point-M	SLH9D(B2) (Recalled); SLJ4P(B3)	BD82HM65 (PCH)	January 9, 2011	32 nm	DMI 2.0	2 GB/s	8 PCIe 2.0	No	2 ports	4 ports	None	12 ports	Yes	3.9 W
HM67	Cougar Point-M	SLH9C(B2) (Recalled); SLJ4N(B3)	BD82HM67 (PCH)	January 9, 2011	32 nm	DMI 2.0	2 GB/s	8 PCIe 2.0	No	2 ports	4 ports	None	14 ports	Yes	3.9 W
UM67	Cougar Point-M	SLH9U(B2); SLJ4L(B3)	BD82UM67 (PCH)	February 20, 2011	32 nm	DMI 2.0	2 GB/s	8 PCIe 2.0	No	2 ports	4 ports	None	14 ports	Yes	3.4 W
QM67	Cougar Point-M	SLH9B(B2); SLJ4M(B3)	BD82QM67 (PCH)	February 20, 2011	32 nm	DMI 2.0	2 GB/s	8 PCIe 2.0	Yes	2 ports	4 ports	None	14 ports	Yes	3.9 W
QS67	Cougar Point-M	SLHAG(B2); SLJ4K(B3)	BD82QS67 (PCH)	February 20, 2011	32 nm	DMI 2.0	2 GB/s	8 PCIe 2.0	Yes	2 ports	4 ports	None	14 ports	Yes	3.4 W
NM70	Panther Point-M	SLJTA(C1)	BD82NM70 (PCH)	August 2012	22 nm	DMI 2.0	2 GB/s	4 PCIe 2.0	?	1 port	3 ports	None	8 ports	Yes	4.1 W
HM70	Panther Point-M	SJTNV(C1)	BD82HM70 (PCH)	April 8, 2012	22 nm	DMI 2.0	2 GB/s	8 PCIe 2.0	No	1 port	4 ports	4 ports	6 ports	Yes	4.1 W
HM75	Panther Point-M	SLJ8F(C1)	BD82HM75 (PCH)	April 8, 2012	22 nm	DMI 2.0	2 GB/s	8 PCIe 2.0	No	2 ports	4 ports	None	12 ports	Yes	4.1 W
HM76	Panther Point-M	SLJ8E(C1)	BD82HM76 (PCH)	April 8, 2012	22 nm	DMI 2.0	2 GB/s	8 PCIe 2.0	No	2 ports	4 ports	4 ports	8 ports	Yes	4.1 W
UM77	Panther Point-M	SLJ8D(C1)	BD82UM77 (PCH)	April 8, 2012	22 nm	DMI 2.0	2 GB/s	4 PCIe 2.0	No	1 port	3 ports	4 ports	6 ports	Yes	3.0 W
HM77	Panther Point-M	SLJ8C(C1)	BD82HM77 (PCH)	April 8, 2012	22 nm	DMI 2.0	2 GB/s	8 PCIe 2.0	No	2 ports	4 ports	4 ports	10 ports	Yes	4.1 W
QM77	Panther Point-M	SLJ8A(C1)	BD82QM77 (PCH)	April 8, 2012	22 nm	DMI 2.0	2 GB/s	8 PCIe 2.0	Yes	2 ports	4 ports	4 ports	10 ports	Yes	4.1 W
QS77	Panther Point-M	SLJ8B(C1)	BD82QS77 (PCH)	April 8, 2012	22 nm	DMI 2.0	2 GB/s	8 PCIe 2.0	Yes	2 ports	4 ports	4 ports	10 ports	Yes	3.0 to 3.6 W
HM86	Lynx Point-M	SR13J(C1); SR17E(C2)	DH82HM86 (PCH)	June 2013	22 nm	DMI 2.0	2 GB/s	8 PCIe 2.0	Yes	4 ports	2 ports	5 ports	10 ports	Yes	2.7 W
QM87	Lynx Point-M	SR13G(C1); SR17C(C2)	DH82QM87 (PCH)	June 2013	22 nm	DMI 2.0	2 GB/s	8 PCIe 2.0	Yes	4 ports	2 ports	6 ports	8 ports	Yes	2.7 W
HM87	Lynx Point-M	SR13H(C1); SR17D(C2)	DH82HM87 (PCH)	June 2013	22 nm	DMI 2.0	2 GB/s	8 PCIe 2.0	Yes	4 ports	2 ports	6 ports	10 ports	Yes	2.7 W
HM97	Wildcat Point-M	SR1JN(A0)	DH82HM97 (PCH)	May 2014	22 nm	DMI 2.0	2 GB/s	8 PCIe 2.0	?	4 ports	2 ports	6 ports	10 ports	Yes	2.7 W

=== On-package mobile chipsets ===
Every 4th Generation Intel Core and 5th Generation Intel Core processor based on Mobile U-Processor and Y-Processor Lines has an on-package Platform Controller Hub.

CPU on-package chipset	Code name	Release date	Process support	Bus interface	Link speed	PCI Express lanes	VT-d support	SATA		USB		FDI support	TDP
CPU on-package chipset	Code name	Release date	Process support	Bus interface	Link speed	PCI Express lanes	VT-d support	6 Gbit/s	3 Gbit/s	v3.2 Gen 1x1	v2.0	FDI support	TDP
8 series low-power, premium	Lynx Point-LP	June 2013	22 nm	OPI✕8	Unknown	12 PCIe 2.0	Yes	Up to 3	Up to 4	Up to 4	8	No	Unknown
9 series U-processor line, base	Wildcat Point-LP	January 2015	?	DMI 2.0	Unknown	10 PCIe 2.0	Yes	2		Up to 4	8	Yes	Unknown
9 series U-processor line, premium	Wildcat Point-LP	January 2015	?	DMI 2.0	Unknown	12 PCIe 2.0	Yes	Up to 4		Up to 4	8	Yes	Unknown
9 series Core M processor line, premium	Wildcat Point-LP	September 2014	?	DMI 2.0	Unknown	12 PCIe 2.0	Yes	Up to 4		Up to 4	10	Yes	Unknown

== 100/200/300 Series chipsets ==
- All support Intel VT-d and do not support PCI.

=== LGA 1151 rev 1 ===
The 100 Series chipsets (codenamed Sunrise Point), for Skylake processors using the LGA 1151 socket, were released in the third quarter of 2015.

The 200 Series chipsets (codenamed Union Point) were introduced along with Kaby Lake processors, which also use the LGA 1151 socket; these were released in the first quarter of 2017.

Chipset	Code name	sSpec number	Part numbers	Release date	Bus interface	Link speed	PCI Express lanes	Optane memory support	SATA	SATAe	PCIe M.2	Wireless MAC	USB ports			TDP
Chipset	Code name	sSpec number	Part numbers	Release date	Bus interface	Link speed	PCI Express lanes	Optane memory support	6 Gbit/s	SATAe	PCIe M.2	Wireless MAC	v3.2 Gen 1x1	v3.2 Gen 2x1	Total	TDP
H110	Sunrise; Point	SR2CA(D1); SR286	GL82H110 (PCH)	Sep. 27, 2015	DMI 2.0	2.0 GB/s	6 PCIe 2.0	No	4	None	None	No	Up to 4	None	Up to 10	6 W
B150	Sunrise; Point	SR2C7(D1); SR283	GL82B150 (PCH)	Sep. 1, 2015	DMI 3.0	3.93 GB/s	8 PCIe 3.0	No	6	Up to 1	None	No	Up to 6	None	Up to 12	6 W
Q150	Sunrise; Point	SR2C6(D1); SR282	GL82Q150 (PCH)	H2 2015	DMI 3.0	3.93 GB/s	10 PCIe 3.0	No	6	Up to 1	None	No	Up to 8	None	Up to 14	6 W
H170	Sunrise; Point	SR2C8(D1); SR284	GL82H170 (PCH)	Sep. 1, 2015	DMI 3.0	3.93 GB/s	16 PCIe 3.0	No	6	Up to 2	Up to 2	No	Up to 8	None	Up to 14	6 W
Q170	Sunrise; Point	SR2C5(D1); SR281	GL82Q170 (PCH)	Oct. 2015	DMI 3.0	3.93 GB/s	20 PCIe 3.0	No	6	Up to 3	Up to 3	No	Up to 10	None	Up to 14	6 W
Z170	Sunrise; Point	SR2C9(D1); SR285	GL82Z170 (PCH)	Aug. 2015	DMI 3.0	3.93 GB/s	20 PCIe 3.0	No	6	Up to 3	Up to 3	No	Up to 10	None	Up to 14	6 W
B250	Union; Point	SR2WC(A0)	GL82B250	Jan. 3, 2017	DMI 3.0	3.93 GB/s	12 PCIe 3.0	Yes	6	Up to 1	Up to 1	No	Up to 6	None	Up to 12	6 W
Q250	Union; Point	SR2WD(A0)	GL82Q250	Jan. 3, 2017	DMI 3.0	3.93 GB/s	14 PCIe 3.0	Yes	6	Up to 1	Up to 1	No	Up to 8	None	Up to 14	6 W
H270	Union; Point	SR2WA(A0)	GL82H270	Jan. 3, 2017	DMI 3.0	3.93 GB/s	20 PCIe 3.0	Yes	6	Up to 2	Up to 2	No	Up to 8	None	Up to 14	6 W
Q270	Union; Point	SR2WE(A0)	GL82Q270	Jan. 3, 2017	DMI 3.0	3.93 GB/s	24 PCIe 3.0	Yes	6	Up to 3	Up to 3	No	Up to 10	None	Up to 14	6 W
Z270	Union; Point	SR2WB(A0)	GL82Z270	Jan. 3, 2017	DMI 3.0	3.93 GB/s	24 PCIe 3.0	Yes	6	Up to 3	Up to 3	No	Up to 10	None	Up to 14	6 W

=== LGA 1151 rev 2 ===
Intel B360 Cannon Point chipset die shot

While Coffee Lake shares the same socket as Skylake and Kaby Lake, this revision of LGA 1151 is electrically incompatible with 100 and 200 series CPUs.

The 300 Series chipsets were introduced along with Coffee Lake processors, which use the LGA 1151 socket; the enthusiast model was released in the last quarter of 2017, the rest of the line was released in 2018.

Chipset	Code name	sSpec number	Part numbers	Release date	Bus interface	Link speed	PCI Express lanes	Optane memory support	SATA	SATAe	PCIe M.2	Wireless MAC	USB ports			TDP
Chipset	Code name	sSpec number	Part numbers	Release date	Bus interface	Link speed	PCI Express lanes	Optane memory support	6 Gbit/s	SATAe	PCIe M.2	Wireless MAC	v3.2 Gen 1x1	v3.2 Gen 2x1	Total	TDP
Z370	Cannon Point	SR3MD(A0)	GL82Z370	October 5, 2017	DMI 3.0	3.93 GB/s	24 PCIe 3.0	Yes	6	up to 3	up to 3	No	Up to 10	None	Up to 14	6 W
H310	Cannon Point	SR409(B0); SRCXT(B0); SRCXY(B0)	?	April 3, 2018	DMI 2.0	2.0 GB/s	6 PCIe 2.0	No	4	None	None	WiFi 5	Up to 4	None	Up to 10	6 W
B360	Cannon Point	SR408(B0)	?	April 3, 2018	DMI 3.0	3.93 GB/s	12 PCIe 3.0	Yes	6	Up to 1	Up to 1	WiFi 5	Up to 6	Up to 4	Up to 12	6 W
B365	Union Point	SREVJ(A0)	?	Dec. 14, 2018	DMI 3.0	3.93 GB/s	20 PCIe 3.0	Yes	6	Up to 2	Up to 2	No	Up to 8	None	Up to 14	6 W
H370	Cannon Point	SR405(B0)	?	April 3, 2018	DMI 3.0	3.93 GB/s	20 PCIe 3.0	Yes	6	Up to 2	Up to 2	WiFi 5	Up to 8	Up to 4	Up to 14	6 W
Q370	Cannon Point	SR404(B0)	?	Q2 2018	DMI 3.0	3.93 GB/s	24 PCIe 3.0	Yes	6	Up to 3	Up to 3	WiFi 5	Up to 10	Up to 6	Up to 14	6 W
Z390	Cannon Point	SR406(B0)	FH82Z390	October 8, 2018	DMI 3.0	3.93 GB/s	24 PCIe 3.0	Yes	6	Up to 3	Up to 3	WiFi 5	Up to 10	Up to 6	Up to 14	6 W

=== Xeon chipsets ===
C232 and C242 chipsets do not support CPU integrated GPUs, as they lack FDI support. Officially they support only Xeon processors, but some motherboards also support consumer processors (6/7th generation Core for C230 series, 8/9th generation Core for C240 series and its Pentium/Celeron derivatives).

Chipset	Code name	sSpec number	Part numbers	Release date	Bus interface	Link speed	PCI Express lanes	SATA	SATAe	PCIe M.2	Wireless MAC	USB ports			TDP
Chipset	Code name	sSpec number	Part numbers	Release date	Bus interface	Link speed	PCI Express lanes	6 Gbit/s	SATAe	PCIe M.2	Wireless MAC	v3.2 Gen 1x1	v3.2 Gen 2x1	Total	TDP
C232	Sunrise Point	SR2CB(D1)	GL82C232 (PCH)	September 1, 2015	DMI 3.0	3.93 GB/s	8 PCIe 3.0	Up to 6	Up to 3	Up to 1	No	Up to 6	None	Up to 12	6 W
C236	Sunrise Point	SR2CC(D1)	GL82C236 (PCH)	September 1, 2015	DMI 3.0	3.93 GB/s	20 PCIe 3.0	Up to 8	Up to 3	Up to 3	No	Up to 10	None	Up to 14	6 W
C242	Coffee Lake	SR40C(B0)	FH82C242	November 2018	DMI 3.0	3.93 GB/s	10 PCIe 3.0	Up to 6	?	Up to 1	No	Up to 6	Up to 2	Up to 12	6 W
C246	Coffee Lake	SR40A(B0)	FH82C246	July 2018	DMI 3.0	3.93 GB/s	24 PCIe 3.0	Up to 8	?	Up to 3	WiFi 5	Up to 10	Up to 6	Up to 14	6 W

=== Dedicated mobile chipsets ===
Chipset	Code name	sSpec number	Part numbers	Release date	Bus interface	Link speed	PCI Express lanes	SATA	SATAe	PCIe M.2	Wireless MAC	USB ports			TDP
Chipset	Code name	sSpec number	Part numbers	Release date	Bus interface	Link speed	PCI Express lanes	6 Gbit/s ports	SATAe	PCIe M.2	Wireless MAC	v3.2		v2.0	TDP
Chipset	Code name	sSpec number	Part numbers	Release date	Bus interface	Link speed	PCI Express lanes	6 Gbit/s ports	SATAe	PCIe M.2	Wireless MAC	Gen 1x1	Gen 2x1	v2.0	TDP
HM170	Sunrise; Point	SR2C4(D1); SR27Z	GL82HM170 (PCH)	September 1, 2015	DMI 3.0	3.93 GB/s	16 PCIe 3.0	Up to 4	?	Up to 2	No	Up to 8	None	Up to 14	2.6 W
QM170	Sunrise; Point	SR2C3(D1); SR27Y	GL82QM170 (PCH)	September 1, 2015	DMI 3.0	3.93 GB/s	16 PCIe 3.0	Up to 4	?	Up to 2	No	Up to 8	None	Up to 14	2.6 W
CM236	Sunrise; Point	SR2CE(D1)	GL82CM236 (PCH)	September 1, 2015	DMI 3.0	3.93 GB/s	20 PCIe 3.0	Up to 8	?	Up to 3	No	Up to 10	None	Up to 14	3.67 W
QMS180	Sunrise; Point	SR2NH(D1)	GLQMS180 (PCH)	?	DMI 3.0	3.93 GB/s	?	?	?	?	No	?	None	Up to 14	?
QMU185	Sunrise; Point			?	DMI 3.0	3.93 GB/s	?	?	?	?	No	?	None	Up to 14	?
HM175	Sunrise; Point	SR30W(D1)	GL82HM175 (PCH)	January 3, 2017	DMI 3.0	3.93 GB/s	16 PCIe 3.0	Up to 4	?	Up to 2	No	Up to 8	None	Up to 14	2.6 W
QM175	Sunrise; Point	SR30V(D1)	GL82QM175 (PCH)	January 3, 2017	DMI 3.0	3.93 GB/s	16 PCIe 3.0	Up to 4	?	Up to 2	No	Up to 8	None	Up to 14	2.6 W
CM238	Sunrise; Point	SR30U(D1)	GL82CM238 (PCH)	January 3, 2017	DMI 3.0	3.93 GB/s	20 PCIe 3.0	Up to 8	?	Up to 3	Up to 10	3.67 W		Up to 14	
HM370	Coffee Lake	SR40B(B0)	FH82HM370 (PCH)	Q2 2018	DMI 3.0	3.93 GB/s	16 PCIe 3.0	Up to 4	?	Up to 2	WiFi 5	Up to 8	Up to 4	Up to 14	3 W
QM370	Coffee Lake	SR40D(B0)	FH82QM370 (PCH)	Q2 2018	DMI 3.0	3.93 GB/s	20 PCIe 3.0	Up to 4	?	Up to 2	WiFi 5	Up to 10	Up to 6	Up to 14	3 W
CM246	Coffee Lake	SR40E(B0)	FH82CM246 (PCH)	Q2 2018	DMI 3.0	3.93 GB/s	24 PCIe 3.0	Up to 8	Up to 4		WiFi 5	Up to 10	Up to 6	Up to 14	3 W

=== On-package mobile chipsets ===
CPU on-package chipset	Code name	Release date	Bus interface	Link speed	PCI Express lanes	SATA	SATAe	PCIe M.2	Wireless MAC	USB ports			TDP
CPU on-package chipset	Code name	Release date	Bus interface	Link speed	PCI Express lanes	6 Gbit/s ports	SATAe	PCIe M.2	Wireless MAC	v3.2		v2.0	TDP
CPU on-package chipset	Code name	Release date	Bus interface	Link speed	PCI Express lanes	6 Gbit/s ports	SATAe	PCIe M.2	Wireless MAC	Gen 1x1	Gen 2x1	v2.0	TDP
100 series (Base-U)	Skylake	September 2015	OPI x8	2GT/s and 4GT/s	10 PCIe 2.0	2	Unknown	?	Unknown	4	None	8	Unknown
100 series (Premium-U)	Skylake	September 2015	OPI x8	2GT/s and 4GT/s	12 PCIe 3.0	3	Unknown	?	Unknown	6	None	10	Unknown
100 series (Premium-Y)	Skylake	September 2015	OPI x8	2GT/s and 4GT/s	10 PCIe 3.0	2	Unknown	?	Unknown	6	None	6	Unknown
Kaby Lake (Base-U)	Kaby Lake	September 2016	OPI x8	2GT/s and 4GT/s	10 PCIe 2.0	2	Unknown	?	Unknown	4	None	10	Unknown
Kaby Lake (Premium-U)	Kaby Lake	September 2016	OPI x8	2GT/s and 4GT/s	12 PCIe 3.0	3	Unknown	?	Unknown	6	None	10	Unknown
Kaby Lake (Premium-Y)	Kaby Lake	September 2016	OPI x8	2GT/s and 4GT/s	10 PCIe 3.0	2	Unknown	?	Unknown	6	None	6	Unknown
300 series (Premium-U)	Coffee Lake	April 2018	OPI x8	Up to 4GT/s	16 PCIe 3.0	3	Unknown	?	Unknown	Up to 6	None	10	Unknown

== 400/500 Series chipsets ==
=== LGA 1200 ===
LGA 1200 is a CPU socket designed for Comet Lake and Rocket Lake desktop CPUs. Like its predecessors, LGA 1200 has the same number of pins its name would suggest: 1200. Under the hood, LGA 1200 is a modified version of LGA 1151, its predecessor. It features 49 additional protruding pins that are used to improve power delivery and provide support for eventual updates with I/O features.

Chipset	Code name	sSpec number	Part numbers	Release date	Bus interface	Link speed	PCI Express lanes	Optane memory support	ECC memory	SATA	SATAe	PCIe M.2	Wireless MAC	USB ports				Rocket Lake support	TDP
Chipset	Code name	sSpec number	Part numbers	Release date	Bus interface	Link speed	PCI Express lanes	Optane memory support	ECC memory	6 Gbit/s	SATAe	PCIe M.2	Wireless MAC	v2.0	v3.2			Rocket Lake support	TDP
Chipset	Code name	sSpec number	Part numbers	Release date	Bus interface	Link speed	PCI Express lanes	Optane memory support	ECC memory	6 Gbit/s	SATAe	PCIe M.2	Wireless MAC	v2.0	Gen 1x1	Gen 2x1	Gen 2x2	Rocket Lake support	TDP
H410	Comet Lake	SRH1D(A0)	FH82H410	Q2 2020	DMI 3.0	×4 (3.93 GB/s)	6 PCIe 3.0	No	No	4	No	Yes	No	Up to 10	Up to 4	None	None	No^{‡}	6 W
B460	Comet Lake	SRH1C(A0)	FH82B460	Q2 2020	DMI 3.0	×4 (3.93 GB/s)	16 PCIe 3.0	Yes	No	6	No	Yes	No	Up to 12	Up to 8	None	None	No^{‡}	6 W
H470	Comet Lake	SRH14(A0)	FH82H470	Q2 2020	DMI 3.0	×4 (3.93 GB/s)	20 PCIe 3.0	Yes	No	6	No	Yes	WiFi 6	Up to 14	Up to 8	Up to 4	None	Yes	6 W
Q470	Comet Lake	SRH1A(A0)	FH82Q470	Q2 2020	DMI 3.0	×4 (3.93 GB/s)	24 PCIe 3.0	Yes	No	6	No	Yes	WiFi 6	Up to 14	Up to 10	Up to 6	None	Yes	6 W
Z490	Comet Lake	SRH13(A0)	FH82Z490	Q2 2020	DMI 3.0	×4 (3.93 GB/s)	24 PCIe 3.0	Yes	No	6	No	Yes	WiFi 6	Up to 14	Up to 10	Up to 6	None	Yes	6 W
W480	Comet Lake	SRH19(A0)	FH82W480	Q2 2020	DMI 3.0	×4 (3.93 GB/s)	24 PCIe 3.0	Yes	UDIMM	8	No	Yes	WiFi 6	Up to 14	Up to 10	Up to 8	None	Yes	6 W
H420E	Comet Lake	SRH8W(A0)	FH82H420E	Q2 2020	DMI 3.0	×4 (3.93 GB/s)	6 PCIe 3.0	Unknown	No	4	No	Unknown	No	Up to 10	Up to 6	None	None	Unknown	6 W
Q470E	Comet Lake	SRJ7X(A0)	FH82Q470E	Q2 2020	DMI 3.0	×4 (3.93 GB/s)	24 PCIe 3.0	Unknown	No	6	No	Unknown	No	14	Up to 10	Up to 6	None	Unknown	6 W
W480E	Comet Lake	SRJ7Y(A0)	FH82W480E	Q2 2020	DMI 3.0	×4 (3.93 GB/s)	24 PCIe 3.0	Unknown	UDIMM	8	No	Unknown	No	14	Up to 10	Up to 8	None	Unknown	6 W
H510	Rocket Lake	SRKM2(B1)	FH82H510	Q1 2021	DMI 3.0	×4 (3.93 GB/s)	6 PCIe 3.0	No	No	4	No	Yes	WiFi 6	Up to 10	Up to 4	None	None	Yes	6 W
B560	Rocket Lake	SRKM5(B1)	FH82B560	Q1 2021	DMI 3.0	×4 (3.93 GB/s)	12 PCIe 3.0	Yes	No	6	No	Yes	WiFi 6	Up to 12	Up to 6	Up to 4	Up to 2	Yes	6 W
H570	Rocket Lake	SRKM6(B1)	FH82H570	Q1 2021	DMI 3.0	×8^{†} (7.86 GB/s)	20 PCIe 3.0	Yes	No	6	No	Yes	WiFi 6	Up to 14	Up to 8	Up to 4	Up to 2	Yes	6 W
Z590	Rocket Lake	SRKM3(B1)	FH82Z590	Q1 2021	DMI 3.0	×8^{†} (7.86 GB/s)	24 PCIe 3.0	Yes	No	6	No	Yes	WiFi 6	Up to 14	Up to 10	Up to 10	Up to 3	Yes	6 W
W580	Rocket Lake	SRKM7(B1)	FH82W580	Q1 2021	DMI 3.0	×8^{†} (7.86 GB/s)	24 PCIe 3.0	Yes	UDIMM	8	No	Yes	WiFi 6	Up to 14	Up to 10	Up to 10	Up to 3	Yes	6 W

- ^{†} Connection to the CPU will be reduced to DMI 3.0 ×4 if a Comet Lake CPU is installed. DMI 3.0 ×8 is only available with Rocket Lake CPUs.
- ^{‡} Mainboards advertised as H410 and B460 with Rocket Lake support use other 400-series chipsets. (such as H470)

=== Dedicated mobile and embedded chipsets ===
Chipset	Code name	sSpec number	Part numbers	Release date	Bus interface	Link speed	PCI Express lanes	Optane memory support	ECC memory	SATA	SATAe	PCIe M.2	Wireless MAC	USB ports				TDP
Chipset	Code name	sSpec number	Part numbers	Release date	Bus interface	Link speed	PCI Express lanes	Optane memory support	ECC memory	6 Gbit/s	SATAe	PCIe M.2	Wireless MAC	v2.0	v3.2			TDP
Chipset	Code name	sSpec number	Part numbers	Release date	Bus interface	Link speed	PCI Express lanes	Optane memory support	ECC memory	6 Gbit/s	SATAe	PCIe M.2	Wireless MAC	v2.0	Gen 1x1	Gen 2x1	Gen 2x2	TDP
HM470	Comet Lake	SRJAU(A0)	FH82HM470	Q2 2020	DMI 3.0	3.93 GB/s	16 PCIe 3.0	Yes	No	4	No	Yes	WiFi 6	Up to 14	Up to 8	Up to 4	Unknown	3 W
QM480	Comet Lake	SRH16	FH82QM480	Q2 2020	DMI 3.0	3.93 GB/s	20 PCIe 3.0	Yes	No	4	No	Yes	WiFi 6	Up to 14	Up to 10	Up to 6	Unknown	3 W
WM490	Comet Lake	SRH17(A0)	FH82WM490	Q2 2020	DMI 3.0	3.93 GB/s	24 PCIe 3.0	Yes	UDIMM	8	No	Yes	WiFi 6	Up to 14	Up to 10	Up to 6	No	3 W
HM570E	Tiger Lake	SRKLS(B1)	FH82HM570E	Q3 2021	DMI 3.0	3.93 GB/s	16 PCIe 3.0	Unknown	No	4	No	Unknown	No	Up to 14	Up to 10	Up to 10	Unknown	2.9 W
QM580E	Tiger Lake	SRKLT(B1)	FH82QM580E	Q3 2021	DMI 3.0	3.93 GB/s	20 PCIe 3.0	Unknown	UDIMM	4	No	Unknown	No	Up to 14	Up to 10	Up to 10	Unknown	2.9 W
RM590E	Tiger Lake	SRKLR(B1)	FH82RM590E	Q3 2021	DMI 3.0	3.93 GB/s	24 PCIe 3.0	Unknown	No	8	No	Unknown	No	Up to 14	Up to 10	Up to 10	Unknown	3.4 W
HM570	Tiger Lake	SRKMA(B1)	FH82HM570	Q2 2021	DMI 3.0	3.93 GB/s	16 PCIe 3.0	Yes	No	4	No	Yes	WiFi 6	Up to 14	Up to 8	Up to 8	Unknown	3.4 W
QM580	Tiger Lake	SRKMC(B1)	FH82QM580	Q2 2021	DMI 3.0	3.93 GB/s	20 PCIe 3.0	Yes	No	4	No	Yes	WiFi 6	Up to 14	Up to 10	Up to 10	Unknown	3.4 W
WM590	Tiger Lake	SRKMB(B1)	FH82WM590	Q2 2021	DMI 3.0	3.93 GB/s	24 PCIe 3.0	Yes	UDIMM	8	No	Yes	WiFi 6	Up to 14	Up to 10	Up to 10	No	3.4 W

=== On-package mobile chipsets ===
CPU on-package chipset	Code name	Release date	Bus interface	Link speed	PCI Express lanes	SATA	SATAe	PCIe M.2	Wireless MAC	USB ports			TDP
CPU on-package chipset	Code name	Release date	Bus interface	Link speed	PCI Express lanes	6 Gbit/s ports	SATAe	PCIe M.2	Wireless MAC	v3.2		v2.0	TDP
CPU on-package chipset	Code name	Release date	Bus interface	Link speed	PCI Express lanes	6 Gbit/s ports	SATAe	PCIe M.2	Wireless MAC	Gen 1x1	Gen 2x1	v2.0	TDP
400 series (Mainstream/Base-U)	Comet Lake	August 2019	OPI x8	Up to 4GT/s	12 PCIe 2.0	Up to 2	No	Yes	?	Up to 4	None	8	Unknown
400 series (Premium-U)	Comet Lake	August 2019	OPI x8	Up to 4GT/s	16 PCIe 3.0	Up to 3	No	Yes	?	Up to 6	Up to 6	10	Unknown
495 series (Premium-U)	Ice Lake	August 2019	OPI x8	Up to 4GT/s	16 PCIe 3.0	Up to 3	No	Yes	?	Up to 6	Up to 6	10	Unknown
495 series (Premium-Y)	Ice Lake	August 2019	OPI x8	Up to 4GT/s	14 PCIe 3.0	Up to 2	No	Yes	?	Up to 6	Up to 6	6	Unknown
500 series (Premium-UP3)	Tiger Lake	September 2020	OPI x8	Up to 4GT/s	12 PCIe 3.0	2	No	Yes	?	4	4	10	Unknown
500 series (Premium-UP4)	Tiger Lake	September 2020	OPI x8	Up to 2GT/s	10 PCIe 3.0	None	No	Yes	?	4	4	6	Unknown

== 600/700 Series chipsets ==
=== LGA 1700 ===
Chipset	Code name	sSpec number	Part numbers	Release date	Bus interface	Link speed	PCI Express lanes		Optane memory support	ECC memory	SATA	SATAe	PCIe M.2	Wireless MAC	USB ports				TDP
Chipset	Code name	sSpec number	Part numbers	Release date	Bus interface	Link speed	PCI Express lanes		Optane memory support	ECC memory	6 Gbit/s	SATAe	PCIe M.2	Wireless MAC	v2.0	v3.2			TDP
Chipset	Code name	sSpec number	Part numbers	Release date	Bus interface	Link speed	4.0	3.0	Optane memory support	ECC memory	6 Gbit/s	SATAe	PCIe M.2	Wireless MAC	v2.0	Gen 1x1	Gen 2x1	Gen 2x2	TDP
Z690	Alder Lake	SRKZZ(B1)	FH82Z690	Q4 2021	DMI 4.0	✕8 (15.76 GB/s)	12	16	Yes	No	8	No	Yes	WiFi 6E	14	10	10	4	6 W
W680	Alder Lake	SRL00(B1)	FH82W680	Q2 2022	DMI 4.0	✕8 (15.76 GB/s)	12	16	Yes	UDIMM	8	No	Yes	WiFi 6E	14	10	10	4	6 W
Q670	Alder Lake	SRL01(B1)	FH82Q670	Q1 2022	DMI 4.0	✕8 (15.76 GB/s)	12	12	Yes	No	8	No	Yes	WiFi 6E	14	10	8	4	6 W
H670	Alder Lake	SRKZY(B1)	FH82H670	Q1 2022	DMI 4.0	✕8 (15.76 GB/s)	12	12	Yes	No	8	No	Yes	WiFi 6E	14	8	4	2	6 W
B660	Alder Lake	SRKZX(B1)	FH82B660	Q1 2022	DMI 4.0	✕4 (7.88 GB/s)	6	8	Yes	No	4	No	Yes	WiFi 6E	12	6	4	2	6 W
H610	Alder Lake	SRKZW(B1)	FH82H610	Q1 2022	DMI 4.0	✕4 (7.88 GB/s)	None	8	No	No	4	No	Yes	WiFi 6E	10	4	2	None	6 W
R680E	Alder Lake	SRL2S(B1)	FH82R680E	Q1 2022	DMI 4.0	✕8 (15.76 GB/s)	12	16	No	UDIMM	8	No	Unknown	WiFi 5	14	10	10	4	6 W
Q670E	Alder Lake	SRL2R(B1)	FH82Q670E	Q1 2022	DMI 4.0	✕8 (15.76 GB/s)	12	12	No	No	8	No	Unknown	WiFi 5	14	10	8	4	6 W
H610E	Alder Lake	SRL2T(B1)	FH82H610E	Q1 2022	DMI 4.0	✕4 (7.88 GB/s)	None	12	No	No	4	No	Unknown	WiFi 6E	10	4	2	None	6 W
Z790	Raptor Lake	SRM8P(B1)	FH82Z790	Q4 2022	DMI 4.0	✕8 (15.76 GB/s)	20	8	Yes	No	8	No	Yes	WiFi 6E	14	10		5	6 W
H770	Raptor Lake	SRM8T(B1)	FH82H770	Q1 2023	DMI 4.0	✕8 (15.76 GB/s)	16	8	Yes	No	8	No	Yes	WiFi 6E	14	8	4	2	6 W
B760	Raptor Lake	SRM8V(B1)	FH82B760	Q1 2023	DMI 4.0	✕4 (7.88 GB/s)	10	4	Yes	No	4	No	Yes	WiFi 6E	12	6	4	2	6 W

=== Dedicated mobile chipsets ===
Every 12th Gen and 13th Gen Intel Core-i mobile CPU excluding HX-series has an on-package Platform Controller Hub.

Chipset	Code name	sSpec number	Part numbers	Release date	Bus interface	Link speed	PCI Express lanes		Optane memory support	ECC memory	SATA	SATAe	PCIe M.2	Wireless MAC	USB ports				TDP
Chipset	Code name	sSpec number	Part numbers	Release date	Bus interface	Link speed	4.0	3.0	Optane memory support	ECC memory	6 Gbit/s	SATAe	PCIe M.2	Wireless MAC	v2.0	v3.2			TDP
Chipset	Code name	sSpec number	Part numbers	Release date	Bus interface	Link speed	4.0	3.0	Optane memory support	ECC memory	6 Gbit/s	SATAe	PCIe M.2	Wireless MAC	v2.0	Gen 1x1	Gen 2x1	Gen 2x2	TDP
HM670	Alder Lake	SRL2Y(B1)	FH82HM670	Q2 2022	DMI 4.0	✕8 (15.76 GB/s)	Up to 16	Up to 12	Yes	No	8	No	Yes	WiFi 6E	Up to 14	Up to 10		Up to 4	3.7 W
WM690	Alder Lake	SRL2Z(B1)	FH82WM690	Q2 2022	DMI 4.0	✕8 (15.76 GB/s)	Up to 16	Up to 12	Yes	UDIMM	8	No	Yes	WiFi 6E	Up to 14	Up to 10		Up to 4	3.7 W
HM770	Raptor Lake	SRM8M(B1)	FH82HM770	January 3, 2023	DMI 4.0	✕8 (15.76 GB/s)	28 including PCIe 3.0		Unknown	No	8	No	Yes	WiFi 6E	Up to 14	Up to 10		Up to 4	3.7 W
WM790	Raptor Lake	SRM8N(B1)	FH82WM790	January 3, 2023	DMI 4.0	✕8 (15.76 GB/s)	28 including PCIe 3.0		Unknown	UDIMM	8	No	Yes	WiFi 6E	Up to 14	Up to 10		Up to 4	3.7 W

=== On-package mobile chipsets ===
CPU on-package chipset	Code name	Release date	Bus interface	Link speed	PCI Express lanes		SATA	SATAe	PCIe M.2	Wireless MAC	USB ports			TDP
CPU on-package chipset	Code name	Release date	Bus interface	Link speed	4.0	3.0	6 Gbit/s ports	SATAe	PCIe M.2	Wireless MAC	v3.2		v2.0	TDP
CPU on-package chipset	Code name	Release date	Bus interface	Link speed	4.0	3.0	6 Gbit/s ports	SATAe	PCIe M.2	Wireless MAC	Gen 1x1	Gen 2x1	v2.0	TDP
600 series (Premium-P)	Alder Lake	February 2022	OPI	✕8 (15.76 GB/s)	None	12	Up to 2	No	Yes	WiFi 6	Up to 4	Up to 4	10	Unknown
700 series (Premium-P)	Raptor Lake	January 2023	OPI	✕8 (15.76 GB/s)	None	12	Up to 2	No	Yes	WiFi 6	Up to 4	Up to 4	10	Unknown

== 800 Series chipsets ==
=== LGA 1851 ===
Chipset	Code name	sSpec number	Part numbers	Release date	Bus interface	Link speed	PCI Express lanes		Optane memory support	ECC memory	SATA	PCIe M.2	Wireless MAC	USB ports				TDP
Chipset	Code name	sSpec number	Part numbers	Release date	Bus interface	Link speed	PCI Express lanes		Optane memory support	ECC memory	6 Gbit/s	PCIe M.2	Wireless MAC	v2.0	v3.2			TDP
Chipset	Code name	sSpec number	Part numbers	Release date	Bus interface	Link speed	4.0	3.0	Optane memory support	ECC memory	6 Gbit/s	PCIe M.2	Wireless MAC	v2.0	Gen 1x1	Gen 2x1	Gen 2x2	TDP
Z890	Arrow Lake	SRPEZ(B0)	FH82Z890	Q4 2024	DMI 4.0	✕8 (15.76 GB/s)	24	—N/a	No	No	8	Yes	WiFi 6E	14	10	10	5	6 W
W880	Arrow Lake	SRPF2(B0)	FH82W880	Q1 2025	DMI 4.0	✕8 (15.76 GB/s)	24	—N/a	No	UDIMM	8	Yes	WiFi 6E	14	10	10	5	6 W
Q870	Arrow Lake	SRPEX(B0)	FH82Q870	Q1 2025	DMI 4.0	✕8 (15.76 GB/s)	20	—N/a	No	No	8	Yes	WiFi 6E	14	10	8	4	6 W
B860	Arrow Lake	SRPEW(B0)	FH82B860	Q1 2025	DMI 4.0	✕4 (7.88 GB/s)	14	—N/a	No	No	4	Yes	WiFi 6E	12	6	4	2	6 W
H810	Arrow Lake	SRPEV(B0)	FH82H810	Q1 2025	DMI 4.0	✕4 (7.88 GB/s)	8	—N/a	No	No	4	Yes	WiFi 6E	10	4	2	None	6 W

=== Dedicated mobile chipsets ===
Chipset	Code name	sSpec number	Part numbers	Release date	Bus interface	Link speed	PCI Express lanes		Optane memory support	ECC memory	SATA	PCIe M.2	Wireless MAC	USB ports				TDP
Chipset	Code name	sSpec number	Part numbers	Release date	Bus interface	Link speed	PCI Express lanes		Optane memory support	ECC memory	6 Gbit/s	PCIe M.2	Wireless MAC	v2.0	v3.2			TDP
Chipset	Code name	sSpec number	Part numbers	Release date	Bus interface	Link speed	4.0	3.0	Optane memory support	ECC memory	6 Gbit/s	PCIe M.2	Wireless MAC	v2.0	Gen 1x1	Gen 2x1	Gen 2x2	TDP
HM870	Arrow Lake	SRPF6(B0)	FH82HM870	Q1 2025	DMI 4.0	✕8 (15.76 GB/s)	24	—N/a	No	No	8	Yes	WiFi 6E	14	10	10	5	3.7 W
WM880	Arrow Lake	SRPF5(B0)	FH82WM880	Q1 2025	DMI 4.0	✕8 (15.76 GB/s)	24	—N/a	No	UDIMM	8	Yes	WiFi 6E	14	10	10	5	3.7 W

== 900 Series chipsets ==
=== LGA 1954 ===
According to: https://www.techpowerup.com/346111/intel-900-series-desktop-motherboard-chipset-specs-leak

Chipset	Code name	sSpec number	Part numbers	Release date	Bus interface	Link speed	PCI Express lanes		ECC memory	SATA	PCIe M.2	Wireless MAC	USB ports				TB4 USB4	TDP
Chipset	Code name	sSpec number	Part numbers	Release date	Bus interface	Link speed	PCI Express lanes		ECC memory	6 Gbit/s	PCIe M.2	Wireless MAC	v2.0	v3.2			TB4 USB4	TDP
Chipset	Code name	sSpec number	Part numbers	Release date	Bus interface	Link speed	5.0	4.0	ECC memory	6 Gbit/s	PCIe M.2	Wireless MAC	v2.0	Gen 1x1	Gen 2x1	Gen 2x2	TB4 USB4	TDP
Z990	Nova Lake		FH82Z990	Q1 2027	DMI 5.0	✕4 (15.76 GB/s)	12	12	No	8	Yes		None	10	10	5	2	
W980	Nova Lake		FH82W980	Q1 2027	DMI 5.0	✕4 (15.76 GB/s)	12	12	UDIMM	8	Yes		None	10	10	5	2	
Q970	Nova Lake		FH82Q970	Q1 2027	DMI 5.0	✕4 (15.76 GB/s)	8	12	No	8	Yes		None	8	8	4	2	
Z970	Nova Lake		FH82Z970	Q1 2027	DMI 5.0	✕2 (7.88 GB/s)	—N/a	14	No	4	Yes		None	6	4	2	1	
B960	Nova Lake		FH82B960	Q1 2027	DMI 5.0	✕2 (7.88 GB/s)	—N/a	14	No	4	Yes		None	6	4	2	1	

== See also ==
- ALi Corporation – for ALi chipsets
- Chips and Technologies
- List of AMD chipsets
- List of ATI chipsets
- Comparison of Nvidia nForce chipsets
- List of Intel Xeon chipsets
- List of Intel processors
- Silicon Integrated Systems – for SiS motherboard chipsets
- List of VIA chipsets
