= ZyMOS =

Semiconductor manufacturing company

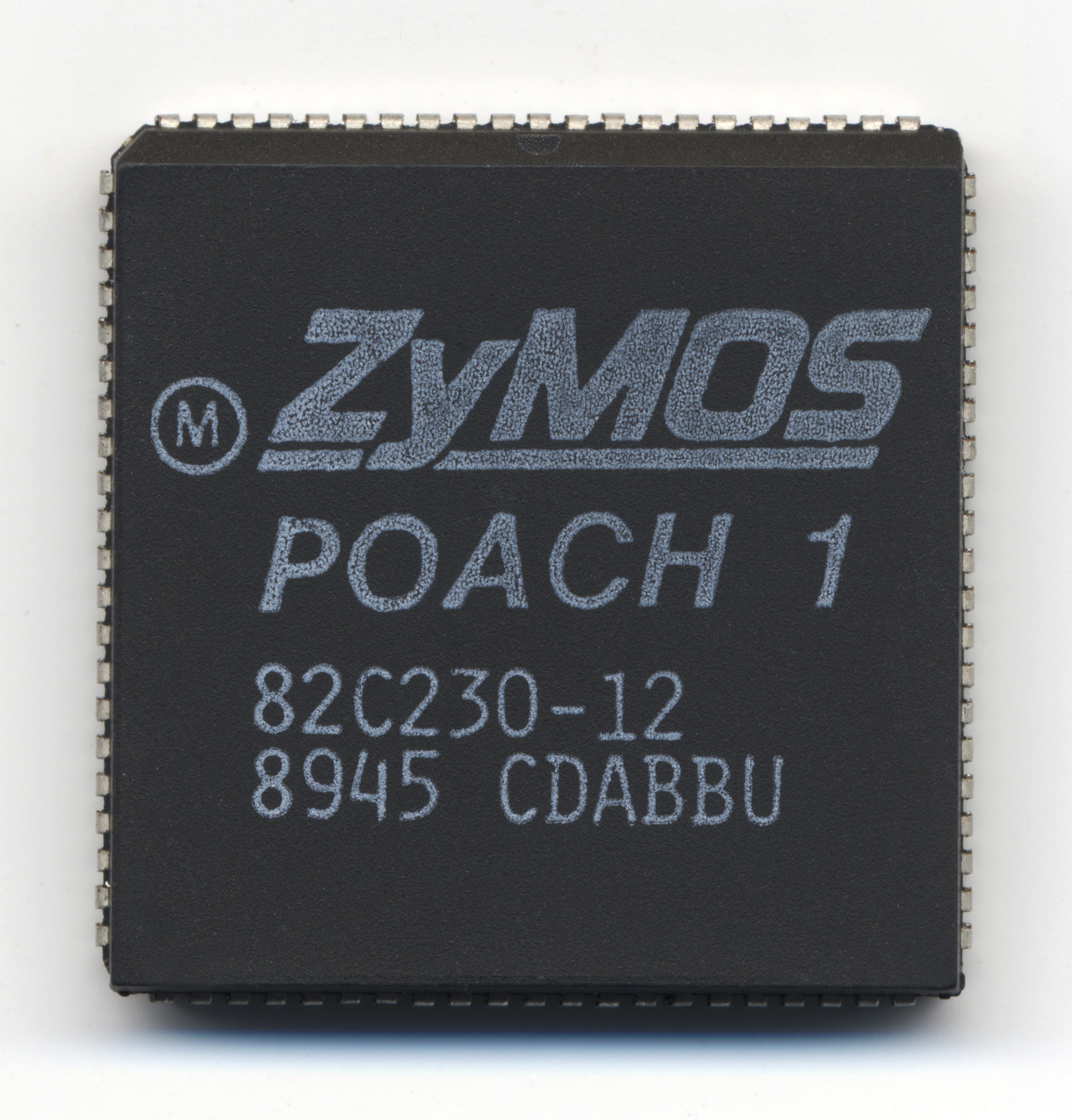
ZyMos Poach 1

ZyMOS Corporation (its name a partial acronym for Zirconium Metal Oxide Semiconductors), later Appian Technology, Inc., was a semiconductor manufacturing company located in Sunnyvale, California. It initially designed and manufactured custom and semi-custom integrated circuits. After the introduction of the IBM PC in the early 1980s, there was strong customer demand for ICs to support the production of IBM PC-AT clones.

In 1987, Appian responded to this demand by developing the POACH (PC-On-A-Chip) peripheral series, one of the first chipsets of its kind, enabling manufacturers of PC AT clones to simplify PC motherboard designs and reduce cost and time to market. Intel soon licensed this chipset to support Intel 80286 sales.

Intel second-sourced to Zymos Corp. of these 82230/82231 High Integration AT-Compatible Chip Set.

Appian later introduced a complementary line of VGA integrated circuits to support manufacturers of VGA boards. Appian later introduced its own line of VGA boards.

ZyMOS was founded in 1978 and changed its name to Appian Technology Inc. on November 1, 1990, just after an acquisition of Renaissance GRX, which was based in Redmond, Washington. This merger helped to add to Appian's line of advanced VGA boards and software.

== See also ==
- Chips and Technologies
- NEAT chipset
- List of Intel chipsets
