= LGA 1150 =

Intel motherboard socket for Haswell CPUs

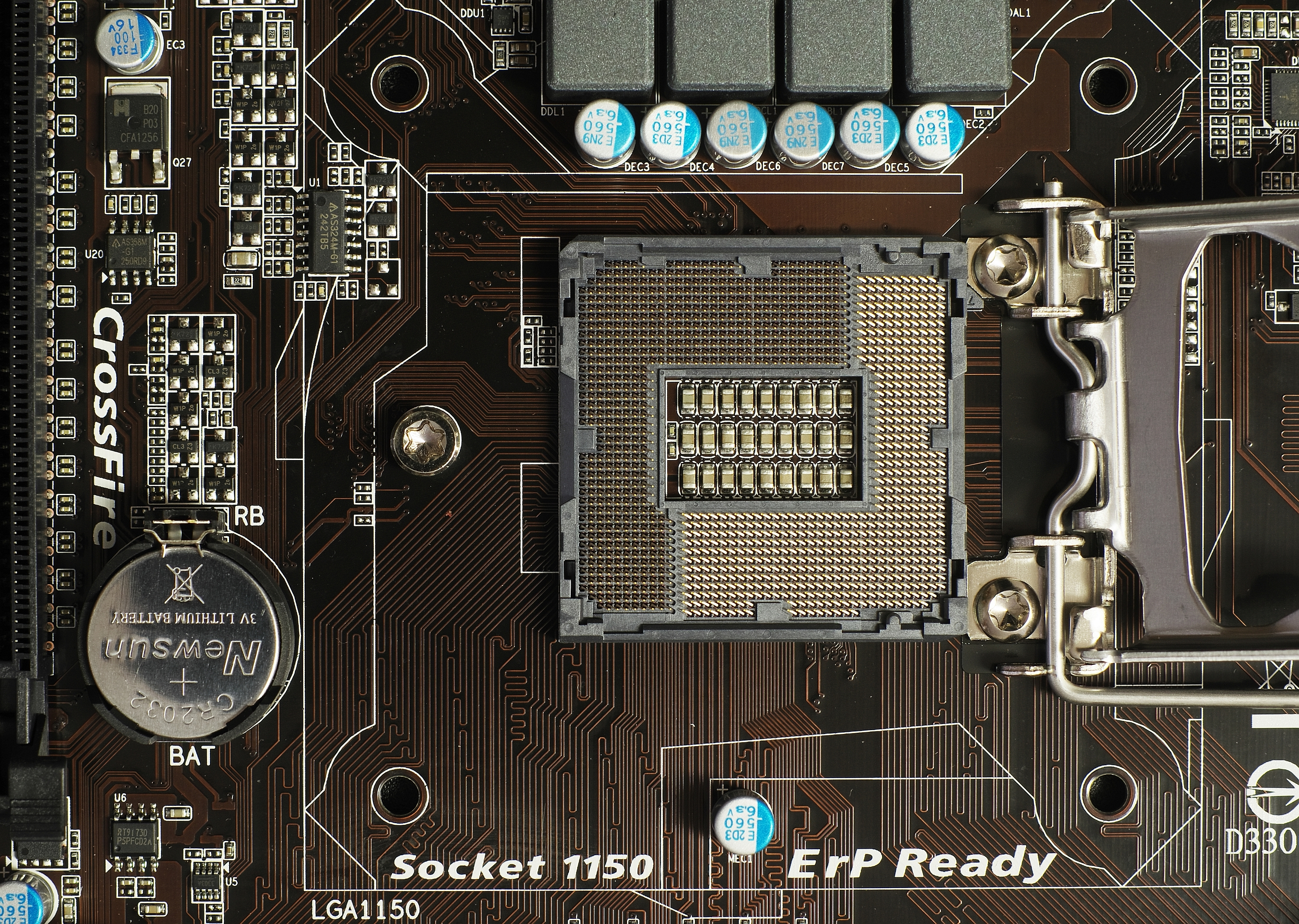
- Release date: 2013
- Type: LGA-ZIF
- Chip form factors: Flip-chip
- Contacts: 1150
- FSB protocol: PCI Express
- Processor dimensions: 37.5 × 37.5 mm 1,406.25 mm²
- Processors: Haswell (1.90 - 4.00 GHz) Haswell-WS (1.10 - 3.70 GHz) Broadwell (2.30 - 3.50 GHz)
- Predecessor: LGA 1155
- Successor: LGA 1151
- Memory support: DDR3
- This article is part of the CPU socket series

LGA 1150 features a Fully Integrated Voltage Regulator.

LGA 1150, also known as Socket H3, is a zero insertion force flip-chip land grid array (LGA) CPU socket designed by Intel for CPUs built on the Haswell and Broadwell microarchitectures. It was first released on June 2, 2013.

It is the successor of LGA 1155 and was itself succeeded by LGA 1151 in 2015.

Most motherboards with the LGA 1150 socket support varying video outputs (DisplayPort, VGA, DVI or HDMI – depending on the model) and Intel Clear Video Technology.

Full support of Windows on LGA 1150 platform starts on Windows 7. Official Windows XP support is limited to selected CPUs, chipsets and only for embedded and industrial systems.

Intel's Platform Controller Hub (PCH) for the LGA 1150 CPUs is codenamed Lynx Point. Intel Xeon processors for socket LGA 1150 use the Intel C222, C224, and C226 chipsets.

== Heatsink ==
The four holes for fastening the heatsink to the motherboard are placed in a square with a lateral length of 75mm for Intel's sockets LGA 1156, LGA 1155, LGA 1150, LGA 1151 and LGA 1200. Cooling solutions should therefore be interchangeable.

== Haswell chipsets ==
=== First generation ===
PCH name		H81	C222	B85	C224	Q85	Q87	C226	H87	Z87
Overclocking		CPU ratio (ASRock, ECS, Biostar, Gigabyte, Asus, MSI) + GPU								CPU + GPU + RAM
Haswell Refresh CPUs support		Yes (may require BIOS update before CPU installation)								
Broadwell CPUs support		No	Yes (may require BIOS update before CPU installation)	No	Yes (may require BIOS update before CPU installation)	No		Yes (may require BIOS update before CPU installation)	No	
Allows using built-in GPU		Yes	No	Yes	No	Yes				
Maximum DIMM slots		2 (Up to 16 GB supported)	4 (Up to 32 GB supported)							
Maximum USB ports	2.0	8				10	8			
Maximum USB ports	3.0	2		4			6			
Maximum SATA ports	2.0	2	4	2			0			
Maximum SATA ports	3.0	2		4			6			
CPU-attached PCI Express (Note: Although these PCI Express lanes are provided by the CPU, the PCH limits their speed and possible configurations of PCI Express links. Capacities may also be lower, depending on the used CPU model.)		1 × PCIe 2.0 ×16	Either 1 × PCIe 3.0 ×16, 2 × PCIe 3.0 ×8, or 1 × PCIe 3.0 ×8 and 2 × PCIe 3.0 ×4	1 × PCIe 3.0 ×16	Either 1 × PCIe 3.0 ×16, 2 × PCIe 3.0 ×8, or 1 × PCIe 3.0 ×8 and 2 × PCIe 3.0 ×4	1 × PCIe 3.0 ×16		Either 1 × PCIe 3.0 ×16, 2 × PCIe 3.0 ×8, or 1 × PCIe 3.0 ×8 and 2 × PCIe 3.0 ×4	1 × PCIe 3.0 ×16	Either 1 × PCIe 3.0 ×16, 2 × PCIe 3.0 ×8, or 1 × PCIe 3.0 ×8 and 2 × PCIe 3.0 ×4
Chipset-attached PCI Express (Note: Provided by the PCH. For Q87, H87 and Z87 chipsets, the number of available PCIe 2.0 ports is configurable and may be lower.)		6 × PCIe 2.0 ×1	8 × PCIe 2.0 ×1							
Conventional PCI support		Although chipsets may not support conventional PCI, motherboard manufacturers can include support through the addition of third-party bridges.								
Intel Rapid Storage Technology (RAID)		No	Enterprise	No	Enterprise	No	Yes	Enterprise	Yes	
Smart Response Technology		No					Yes			
Intel Anti-Theft Technology		Yes								
Intel Active Management, Trusted Execution, VT-d Technologies and Intel vPro Platform Eligibility		No	VT-d available only	No	VT-d available only	No	Yes		No	Not supported, but ASRock Z87 Extreme6 supports VT-d
Release date		August–September 2013	June 2, 2013							
Chipset TDP		4.1 W								
Chipset lithography		32 nm								

=== Second generation ===
On May 12, 2014, Intel announced the release of two 9-series chipsets, H97 and Z97. Differences and new features of these two chipsets, compared to their H87 and Z87 counterparts, are the following:

- Support for Haswell Refresh CPUs out of the box
- Support for the fifth generation of Intel Core CPUs, built around the Broadwell microarchitecture
- Support for SATA Express, M.2 and Thunderbolt, though only if implemented by the motherboard's manufacturer
- Two of the six SATA ports can be converted to two PCIe lanes and used to provide M.2 or SATA Express connectivity. Intel refers to this variable configuration as Flex I/O or Flexible I/O.

Motherboards based on H97 and Z97 chipsets were available for purchase the same day chipsets were announced.

PCH name	H97	Z97
Overclocking	CPU + GPU	CPU + GPU + RAM
Haswell Refresh CPUs support	Yes	
Broadwell CPUs support	Yes	
Maximum DIMM slots	4	
Maximum USB 2.0/3.0 ports	8 / 6	
Maximum SATA 2.0/3.0 ports	0 / 6	
CPU-attached PCI Express	1 × PCIe 3.0 ×16	Either 1 × PCIe 3.0 ×16, 2 × PCIe 3.0 ×8, or 1 × PCIe 3.0 ×8 and 2 × PCIe 3.0 ×4
Chipset-attached PCI Express	8 × PCIe 2.0 ×1	
Conventional PCI support	No	
Intel Rapid Storage Technology (RAID)	Yes	
Smart Response Technology	Yes	
Intel Anti-Theft Technology	Yes	
Intel Active Management, Trusted Execution, VT-d and vPro Technology	No	Not supported, but some boards (for example ASRock Z97 Extreme6 and Extreme6/ac) support VT-d
Release date	May 12, 2014	
Chipset TDP	4.1 W	
Chipset lithography	22 nm	

== See also ==
- List of Intel chipsets
- List of Intel microprocessors
