= Haswell (microarchitecture) =

2013 processor microarchitecture

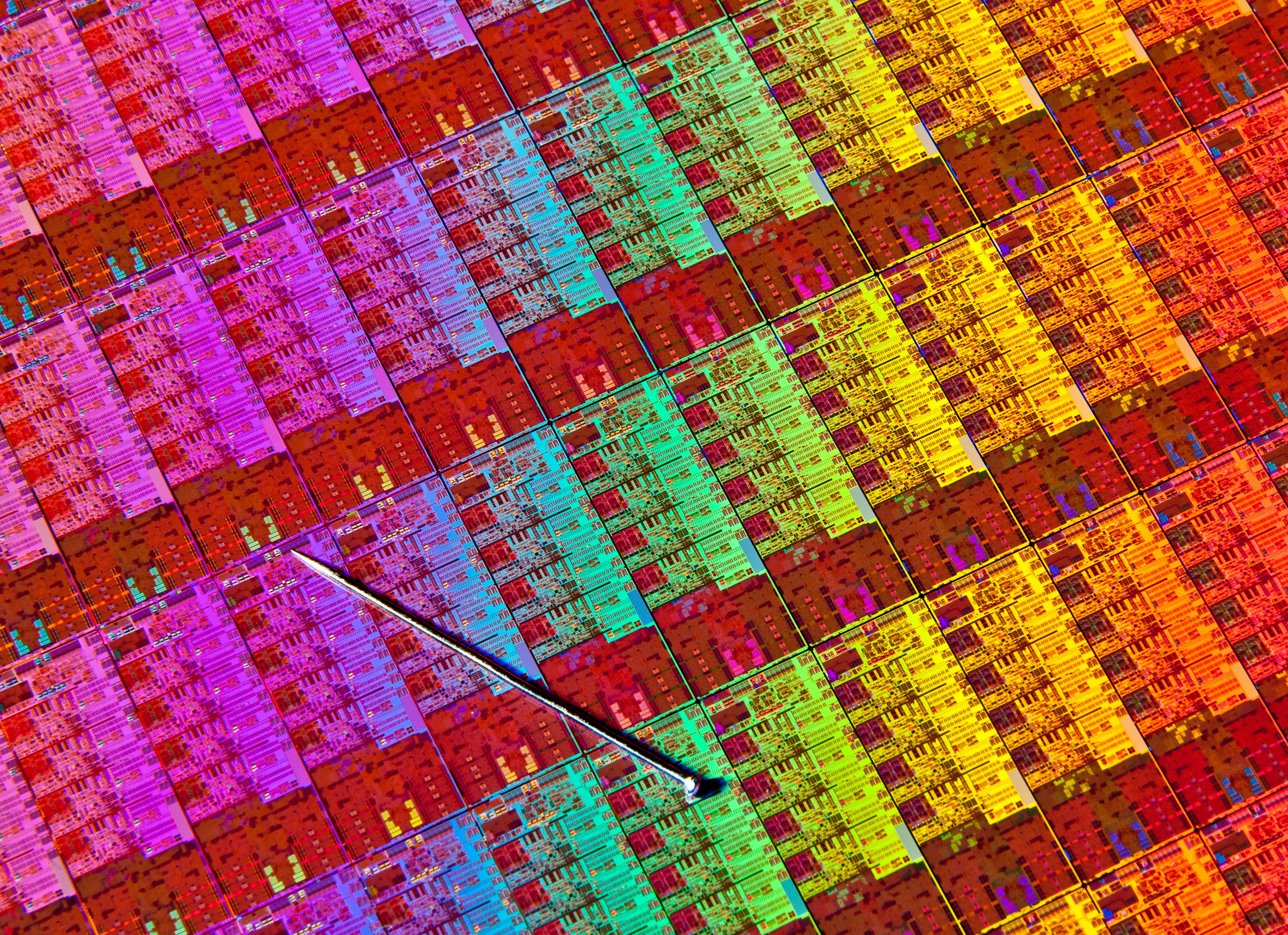
- A Haswell wafer with several dies, with a pin for scale

General information
- Launched: June 4, 2013; 13 years ago
- Marketed by: Intel
- Designed by: Intel
- Common manufacturer: Intel
- CPUID code: 0306C3h
- Product code: 80646 (desktop LGA 1150); 80647 (mobile Socket G3); 80648 (desktop LGA 2011-3); 80644 (server LGA 2011-3)

Performance
- Max. CPU clock rate: 800 MHz to 4.4 GHz
- QPI speeds: 9.6 GT/s
- DMI speeds: 4 GT/s

Physical specifications
- Cores: 2–4 (mainstream); 6–8 (enthusiast); 2–18 (Xeon)
- GPUs: HD Graphics 4200; HD Graphics 4400; HD Graphics 4600; HD Graphics 5000; Iris 5100; Iris Pro 5200
- Sockets: LGA 1150; rPGA 947; BGA 1364; BGA 1168; LGA 2011-v3

Cache
- L1 cache: 64 KB per core (32 KB instructions + 32 KB data)
- L2 cache: 256 KB per core
- L3 cache: 2–45 MB (shared)
- L4 cache: 128 MB of eDRAM (Iris Pro models only)

Architecture and classification
- Technology node: 22 nm (Tri-Gate)
- Microarchitecture: Haswell
- Instruction set: x86-16, IA-32, x86-64
- Extensions: AES-NI, CLMUL, RDRAND, TXT; MMX, SSE, SSE2, SSE3, SSSE3, SSE4.1, SSE4.2, FMA3, AVX, AVX2, and TSX (disabled via microcode, except for Haswell-EX); VT-x, VT-d

Products, models, variants
- Models: Haswell-DT; Haswell-ULT; Haswell-ULX; Haswell-H; Haswell-MB; Haswell-E; Haswell-EP; Haswell-EX
- Brand name: Core i3; Core i5; Core i7; Xeon E3 v3; Xeon E5 v3; Xeon E7 v3; Pentium; Celeron

History
- Predecessors: Sandy Bridge (tock); Ivy Bridge (tick)
- Successors: Broadwell (tick/process); Skylake (tock)

Support status
- Unsupported

Haswell is a microarchitecture for central processing units (CPUs) developed by Intel. First released in 2013, Haswell implements the x86-64 instruction set, which is the 64-bit variant of x86. It is the tock part of Intel's Tick–tock model, the stage where new architectural designs are implemented, while inheriting the previous generation's manufacturing process; Haswell chips share the same 22 nm FinFET with its predecessor, Ivy Bridge. Instead, Haswell is focused on microarchitectural improvements. Products based on Haswell were marketed as the 4th generation Core, v3-suffixed Xeon processors, and various other models of Pentium and Celeron. The earliest demonstration of Haswell-based chips took place at the 2011 Intel Developer Forum, with products officially announced on June 4, 2013, at that year's Computex Taipei. Commercial sales began for manufacturers and OEMs in mid-2013, and standalone desktop chips in September 2013. Haswell CPUs are compatible with motherboards using Intel series 8, 9, C220 and C610 chipsets.

At least one Haswell-based processor was still being sold in 2022 — the Pentium G3420. Windows 7 through Windows 10 were released for the Haswell microarchitecture.

== Design ==
The Haswell architecture is specifically designed to optimize the power savings and performance benefits from the move to FinFET (non-planar, "3D") transistors on the improved 22 nm process node.

Haswell has been launched in three major forms:

- Desktop version (LGA 1150 socket and the LGA 2011-v3 socket): Haswell-DT
- Mobile/Laptop version (PGA socket): Haswell-MB
- BGA version:
  - 47 W and 57 W TDP classes: Haswell-H (for "All-in-one" systems, Mini-ITX form factor motherboards, and other small footprint formats)
  - 13.5 W and 15 W TDP classes (MCP): Haswell-ULT (for Intel's UltraBook platform)
  - 10 W TDP class (SoC): Haswell-ULX (for tablets and certain UltraBook-class implementations)

=== Notes ===
- ULT = Ultra Low TDP; ULX = Ultra Low eXtreme TDP
- Only certain quad-core variants and BGA R-series stock keeping units (SKUs) receive GT3e (Intel Iris Pro 5200) integrated graphics. All other models have GT3 (Intel HD 5000 or Iris Pro 5100), GT2 (Intel HD 4200, 4400, 4600, P4600 or P4700) or GT1 (Intel HD Graphics) integrated graphics. See also Intel HD and Iris Graphics for more details.
- Due to the low power requirements of tablet and Ultrabook platforms, Haswell-ULT and Haswell-ULX are only available in dual-core configurations. All other versions come as dual- or quad-core variants.

=== Performance ===
Compared to Ivy Bridge:

- Approximately 8% faster vector processing
- Up to 5% higher single-threaded performance
- 6% higher multi-threaded performance
- Desktop variants of Haswell draw between 8% and 23% more power under load than Ivy Bridge.
- A 6% increase in sequential CPU performance (eight execution ports per core versus six)
- Up to 20% performance increase over the integrated HD4000 GPU (Haswell HD4600 vs Ivy Bridge's built-in Intel HD4000)
- Total performance improvement on average is about 3%
- Around 15 °C hotter than Ivy Bridge, while clock frequencies of over 4.6 GHz are achievable

== Technology ==
=== Features carried over from Ivy Bridge ===
- 22 nm manufacturing process
- 3D Tri-Gate FinFET transistors
- Micro-operation cache (Uop Cache) capable of storing 1.5 K micro-operations (approximately 6 KB in size)
- 14- to 19-stage instruction pipeline, depending on the micro-operation cache hit or miss (an approach used in the even earlier Sandy Bridge microarchitecture)
- Mainstream variants are up to quad-core.
- Native support for dual-channel DDR3/DDR3L memory, with up to 32 GB of RAM on LGA 1150 variants
- 64 KB (32 KB Instruction + 32 KB Data) L1 cache and 256 KB L2 cache per core
- A total of 16 PCI Express 3.0 lanes on LGA 1150 variants

=== Architecture changes compared to Ivy Bridge microarchitecture ===
Haswell featured a Fully Integrated Voltage Regulator.

==== CPU ====
- Improved OoO window from 168 to 192
- Queue Allocation from 28/threads to 56
- Wider core: fourth arithmetic logic unit (ALU), third address generation unit (AGU), second branch execution unit (BEU), deeper buffers, higher cache bandwidth, improved front-end and memory controller, higher load/store bandwidth.
- New instructions: AVX2, FMA3, BMI1, BMI2, ABM and gather support.
- The instruction decode queue, which holds instructions after they have been decoded, is no longer statically partitioned between the two threads that each core can service.
- Intel Transactional Synchronization Extensions (TSX) for the Haswell-EX variant. In August 2014 Intel announced that a bug exists in the TSX implementation on the current steppings of Haswell, Haswell-E, Haswell-EP and early Broadwell CPUs, which resulted in disabling the TSX feature on affected CPUs via a microcode update.
- Fully integrated voltage regulator (FIVR), thereby moving some of the components from motherboard onto the CPU.
- New advanced power-saving system; due to Haswell's new low-power C6 and C7 sleep states, not all power supply units (PSUs) are suitable for computers with Haswell CPUs.

Translation lookaside buffer sizes
Cache		Page size		
Name	Level	4 KB	2 MB	1 GB
DTLB	1st	64	32	4
ITLB	1st	128	8 / logical core	none
STLB	2nd	1024		none

==== GPU ====
- Support for Direct3D 11.1, Direct3D 12 and OpenGL 4.3 on Windows, OpenGL 4.6 and partial support of Vulkan on Linux with HasVK.
- Intel 10.18.14.5180 driver is the last planned driver release on Windows 7/8.1.
- Four versions of the integrated GPU: GT1, GT2, GT3 and GT3e, where GT3 version has 40 execution units (EUs). Haswell's predecessor, Ivy Bridge, has a maximum of 16 EUs. GT3e version with 40 EUs and on-package 128 MB of embedded DRAM (eDRAM), called Crystalwell, is available only in mobile H-SKUs and desktop (BGA-only) R-SKUs. Effectively, this eDRAM is a Level 4 cache; it is shared dynamically between the on-die GPU and CPU, and serving as a victim cache to the CPU's Level 3 cache.

==== I/O ====
- New sockets and chipsets:
  - LGA 1150 for desktops, and rPGA947 and BGA1364 for the mobile market.
  - Z97 (performance) and H97 (mainstream) chipsets for the Haswell Refresh and Broadwell, in Q2 2014.
  - LGA 2011-v3 with X99 chipset for the enthusiast-class desktop platform Haswell-E.
- DDR4 for enterprise/server segments and for the Enthusiast-Class Desktop Platform Haswell-E
- Variable Base clock (BClk) like LGA 2011.
- Optional support for Thunderbolt technology and Thunderbolt 2.0
- Shrink of the Platform Controller Hub (PCH), from 65 nm to 32 nm.

==== Other ====
- 37, 47, 57 W thermal design power (TDP) mobile processors.
- 35, 45, 65, 84, 88, 95 and 130–140 W (high-end, Haswell-E) TDP desktop processors.
- 15 W or 11.5W TDP processors for the Ultrabook platform (multi-chip package like Westmere) leading to reduced heat, which results in thinner as well as lighter Ultrabooks, but the performance level is slightly lower than the 17 W version.

=== Server processors features ===
- Haswell-EP variant, released in September 2014, with up to 18 cores and marketed as the Xeon E5-1600 v3 and Xeon E5-2600 v3 series.
- Haswell-EX variant, released in May 2015, with 18 cores and functioning TSX.
- A new cache design.
- Up to 45 MB total unified cache (last level cache, LLC) for Haswell-EP and Haswell-EX.
- LGA 2011-v3 socket replaces LGA 2011 for the Haswell EP; the new socket has the same number of pins, but it is keyed differently due to electrical incompatibility.
- The already launched Xeon E3 v3 Haswells will get a refresh in spring 2014, together with a refreshed Intel C220 series PCH chipset.
- TDP up to 160 W for Haswell-EP.
- Haswell-EP models with ten and more cores support cluster on die (COD) operation mode, allowing CPU's multiple columns of cores and last level cache (LLC) slices to be logically divided into what is presented as two non-uniform memory access (NUMA) CPUs to the operating system. By keeping data and instructions local to the "partition" of CPU which is processing them, therefore decreasing the LLC access latency, COD brings performance improvements to NUMA-aware operating systems and applications.

=== Haswell Refresh ===
Around the middle of 2014, Intel released a refresh of Haswell, simply titled Haswell Refresh. When compared to the original Haswell CPUs lineup, Haswell Refresh CPUs offer a modest increase in clock frequencies, usually of 100 MHz. Haswell Refresh CPUs are supported by Intel's 9 Series chipsets (Z97 and H97, codenamed Wildcat Point), while motherboards with 8 Series chipsets (codenamed Lynx Point) usually require a BIOS update to support Haswell Refresh CPUs.

The CPUs codenamed Devil's Canyon, covering the i5 and i7 K-series SKUs, employ a new and improved thermal interface material (TIM) called next-generation polymer thermal interface material (NGPTIM). This improved TIM reduces the CPU's operating temperatures and improves the overclocking potential, as something that had been problematic since the introduction of Ivy Bridge. Other changes for the Devil's Canyon CPUs include a TDP increase to 88 W, additional decoupling capacitors to help smooth out the outputs from the fully integrated voltage regulator (FIVR), and support for the VT-d that was previously limited to non-K-series SKUs. TSX was another feature brought over from the non-K-series SKUs, until August 2014 when a microcode update disabled TSX due to a bug that was discovered in its implementation.

=== Windows XP and Vista support ===
While Ivy Bridge is the last Intel processor to fully support all versions of Windows XP, Haswell includes limited driver support for certain XP editions such as POSReady2009. People have modified the graphics driver for these versions to adapt to normal Windows XP to varying degrees of success.

Windows Vista has also been discontinued with this processor. People who have installed x64 version of Vista have reported various problems such as services not starting automatically. The KB4493471 update (officially intended only for Windows Server 2008, but can be installed on Vista) contains a HAL driver that allegedly fixes these issues; however, upon several tests it's been confirmed - it doesn't fix any of the issues. Windows XP and prior releases, and all x86 versions and editions of Vista are unaffected by this bug.

A patch has been released that fixes this bug.

== List of Haswell processors ==
=== Desktop processors ===
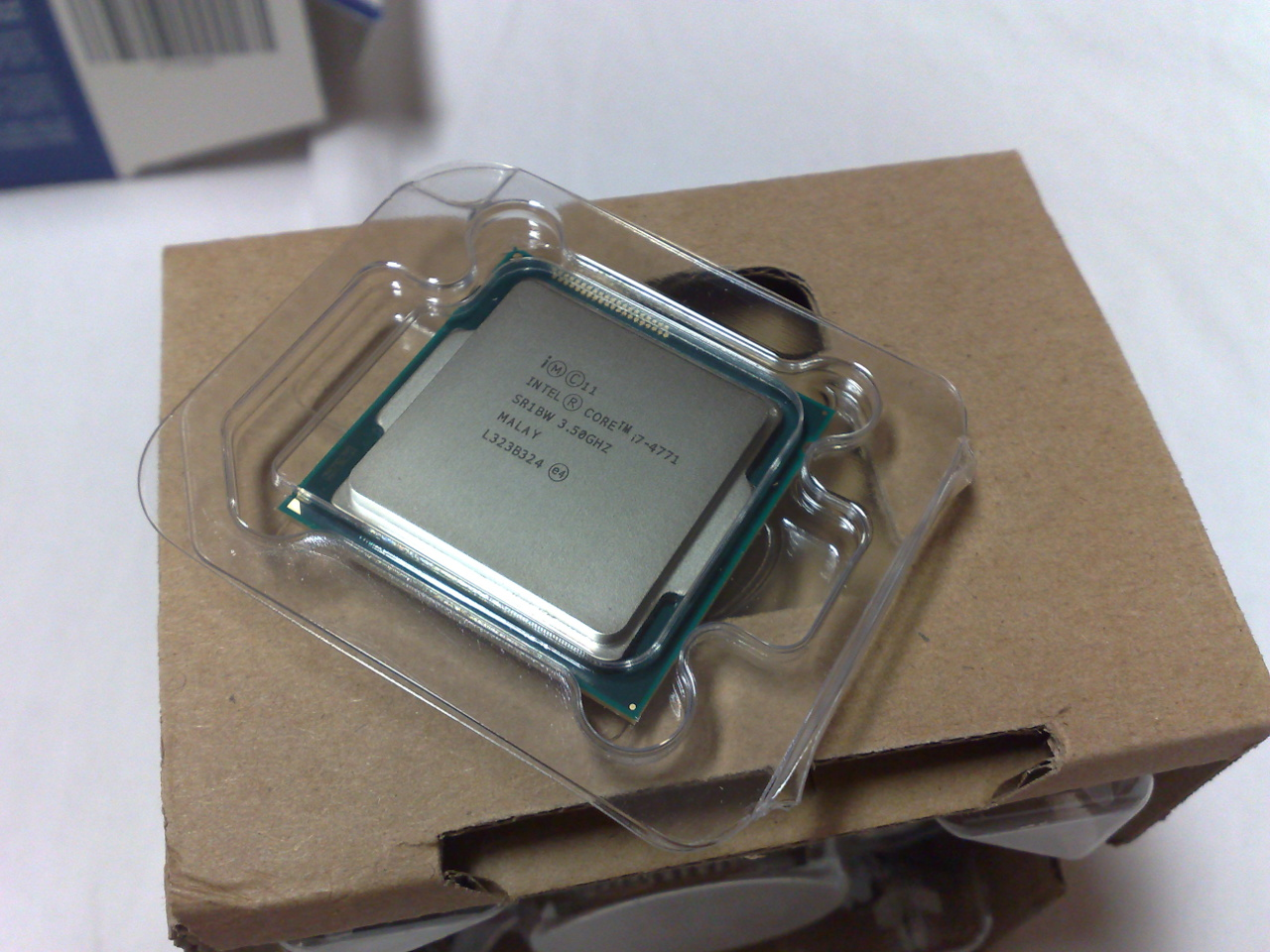
Intel Haswell i7-4771 CPU, sitting atop its original packaging that contains an OEM fan-cooled heatsink

- All models support: MMX, SSE, SSE2, SSE3, SSSE3, SSE4.1, SSE4.2, F16C, Enhanced Intel SpeedStep Technology (EIST), Intel 64, XD bit (an NX bit implementation), Intel VT-x, and Smart Cache.
  - Core i3, i5 and i7 support AVX, AVX2, BMI1, BMI2, FMA3, and AES-NI.
  - Core i3 and i7, as well as the Core i5-4570T and i5-4570TE, support Hyper-Threading (HT).
  - Core i5 and i7 support Turbo Boost 2.0.
  - Although it was initially supported on selected models, since August 2014 desktop variants no longer support TSX due to a bug that was discovered in its implementation; as a workaround, a microcode update disabled the TSX feature.
  - SKUs below 45xx as well as R-series and K-series SKUs do not support Trusted Execution Technology or vPro.
  - Intel VT-d, which is Intel's IOMMU, is supported on all i5 and i7 SKUs except the i5-4670K and i7-4770K. Support for VT-d requires the chipset and motherboard to also support VT-d.
  - Models i5-4690K and i7-4790K, codenamed Devil's Canyon, have a better internal thermal grease to help heat escape and an improved internal voltage regulator ("FIVR"), to help deliver cleaner power in situations like overclocking.
- Transistors: 1.4 billion
- Die size: 177 mm^{2}
- Intel HD and Iris Graphics in following variants:
  - R-series desktop processors feature Intel Iris Pro 5200 graphics (GT3e).
  - The i3-41xxx processors include HD 4400 graphics (GT2).
  - All other i3, i5 and i7 desktop processors include Intel HD 4600 graphics (GT2).
  - Celeron and Pentium processors contain Intel HD Graphics (GT1).
- Pentium G3258, also known as the Pentium Anniversary Edition, has an unlocked multiplier. Its release marks 20 years of "Pentium" as a brand.

The following table lists available desktop processors.

Target segment	Cores (threads)	Processor branding and model		GPU model	CPU clock rate		GPU clock rate		Cache		TDP	PCIe 3.0 lane configurations^{[a]}	VT-d^{[b]}	Release date	Release price (USD)	Motherboard		
Target segment	Cores (threads)	Processor branding and model		GPU model	Base	Turbo	Base	Turbo	L3	L4 (Note: Implemented as eDRAM and serving primarily to increase the performance of integrated GPU, while being shared with the CPU)	TDP	PCIe 3.0 lane configurations^{[a]}	VT-d^{[b]}	Release date	Release price (USD)	Socket	Interface	Memory
Enthusiast / High-End	8 (16)	Core i7 Extreme	5960X	—N/a	3.0 GHz	3.5 GHz	—N/a	—N/a	20 MB	—N/a	140 W	2×16 + 1×8	Yes	August 29, 2014	$999	LGA 2011-v3	DMI 2.0; PCIe 3.0	Up to quad channel DDR4-2133
Enthusiast / High-End	6 (12)	Core i7 Extreme	5930K	—N/a	3.5 GHz	3.7 GHz	—N/a	—N/a	15 MB	—N/a	140 W	2×16 + 1×8	Yes	August 29, 2014	$583	LGA 2011-v3	DMI 2.0; PCIe 3.0	Up to quad channel DDR4-2133
Enthusiast / High-End	6 (12)	Core i7 Extreme	5820K	—N/a	3.3 GHz	3.6 GHz	—N/a	—N/a	15 MB	—N/a	140 W	1×16 + 1×8 + 1×4	Yes	August 29, 2014	$389	LGA 2011-v3	DMI 2.0; PCIe 3.0	Up to quad channel DDR4-2133
Performance	4 (8)	Core i7	4790K	HD 4600 (GT2)	4.0 GHz	4.4 GHz	350 MHz	1.25 GHz	8 MB	—N/a	88 W	1×16; 2×8; 1×8 + 2×4	Yes	June 2, 2014	$339	LGA; 1150	DMI 2.0; PCIe 3.0	Up to dual channel DDR3-1600
Performance	4 (8)	Core i7	4790	HD 4600 (GT2)	3.6 GHz	4.0 GHz	350 MHz	1.2 GHz	8 MB	—N/a	84 W	1×16; 2×8; 1×8 + 2×4	Yes	May 11, 2014	$303	LGA; 1150	DMI 2.0; PCIe 3.0	Up to dual channel DDR3-1600
Performance	4 (8)	Core i7	4790S	HD 4600 (GT2)	3.2 GHz	4.0 GHz	350 MHz	1.2 GHz	8 MB	—N/a	65 W	1×16; 2×8; 1×8 + 2×4	Yes	May 11, 2014	$303	LGA; 1150	DMI 2.0; PCIe 3.0	Up to dual channel DDR3-1600
Performance	4 (8)	Core i7	4790T	HD 4600 (GT2)	2.7 GHz	3.9 GHz	350 MHz	1.2 GHz	8 MB	—N/a	45 W	1×16; 2×8; 1×8 + 2×4	Yes	May 11, 2014	$303	LGA; 1150	DMI 2.0; PCIe 3.0	Up to dual channel DDR3-1600
Performance	4 (8)	Core i7	4785T	HD 4600 (GT2)	2.2 GHz	3.2 GHz	350 MHz	1.2 GHz	8 MB	—N/a	35 W	1×16; 2×8; 1×8 + 2×4	Yes	May 11, 2014	$303	LGA; 1150	DMI 2.0; PCIe 3.0	Up to dual channel DDR3-1600
Performance	4 (8)	Core i7	4771	HD 4600 (GT2)	3.5 GHz	3.9 GHz	350 MHz	1.2 GHz	8 MB	—N/a	84 W	1×16; 2×8; 1×8 + 2×4	Yes	September 1, 2013	$320	LGA; 1150	DMI 2.0; PCIe 3.0	Up to dual channel DDR3-1600
Performance	4 (8)	Core i7	4770K	HD 4600 (GT2)	3.5 GHz	3.9 GHz	350 MHz	1.25 GHz	8 MB	—N/a	84 W	1×16; 2×8; 1×8 + 2×4	No	June 2, 2013	$339	LGA; 1150	DMI 2.0; PCIe 3.0	Up to dual channel DDR3-1600
Performance	4 (8)	Core i7	4770	HD 4600 (GT2)	3.4 GHz	3.9 GHz	350 MHz	1.2 GHz	8 MB	—N/a	84 W	1×16; 2×8; 1×8 + 2×4	Yes	June 2, 2013	$303	LGA; 1150	DMI 2.0; PCIe 3.0	Up to dual channel DDR3-1600
Performance	4 (8)	Core i7	4770S	HD 4600 (GT2)	3.1 GHz	3.9 GHz	350 MHz	1.2 GHz	8 MB	—N/a	65 W	1×16; 2×8; 1×8 + 2×4	Yes	June 2, 2013	$303	LGA; 1150	DMI 2.0; PCIe 3.0	Up to dual channel DDR3-1600
Performance	4 (8)	Core i7	4770R	Iris Pro 5200 (GT3e)	3.2 GHz	3.9 GHz	200 MHz	1.3 GHz	6 MB	128 MB	65 W	1×16; 2×8; 1×8 + 2×4	Yes	June 2, 2013	$392	BGA; 1364	DMI 2.0; PCIe 3.0	Up to dual channel DDR3-1600
Performance	4 (8)	Core i7	4770T	HD 4600 (GT2)	2.5 GHz	3.7 GHz	350 MHz	1.2 GHz	8 MB	—N/a	45 W	1×16; 2×8; 1×8 + 2×4	Yes	June 2, 2013	$303	LGA; 1150	DMI 2.0; PCIe 3.0	Up to dual channel DDR3-1600
Performance	4 (8)	Core i7	4770TE	HD 4600 (GT2)	2.3 GHz	3.3 GHz	350 MHz	1 GHz	8 MB	—N/a	45 W	1×16; 2×8; 1×8 + 2×4	Yes	June 2, 2013	$303	LGA; 1150	DMI 2.0; PCIe 3.0	Up to dual channel DDR3-1600
Performance	4 (8)	Core i7	4765T	HD 4600 (GT2)	2.0 GHz	3.0 GHz	350 MHz	1.2 GHz	8 MB	—N/a	35 W	1×16; 2×8; 1×8 + 2×4	Yes	June 2, 2013	$303	LGA; 1150	DMI 2.0; PCIe 3.0	Up to dual channel DDR3-1600
Mainstream	4 (4)	Core i5	4690K	HD 4600 (GT2)	3.5 GHz	3.9 GHz	350 MHz	1.2 GHz	6 MB	—N/a	88 W	1×16; 2×8; 1×8 + 2×4	Yes	June 2, 2014	$242	LGA; 1150	DMI 2.0; PCIe 3.0	Up to dual channel DDR3-1600
Mainstream	4 (4)	Core i5	4690	HD 4600 (GT2)	3.5 GHz	3.9 GHz	350 MHz	1.2 GHz	6 MB	—N/a	84 W	1×16; 2×8; 1×8 + 2×4	Yes	May 11, 2014	$213	LGA; 1150	DMI 2.0; PCIe 3.0	Up to dual channel DDR3-1600
Mainstream	4 (4)	Core i5	4690S	HD 4600 (GT2)	3.2 GHz	3.9 GHz	350 MHz	1.2 GHz	6 MB	—N/a	65 W	1×16; 2×8; 1×8 + 2×4	Yes	May 11, 2014	$213	LGA; 1150	DMI 2.0; PCIe 3.0	Up to dual channel DDR3-1600
Mainstream	4 (4)	Core i5	4690T	HD 4600 (GT2)	2.5 GHz	3.5 GHz	350 MHz	1.2 GHz	6 MB	—N/a	45 W	1×16; 2×8; 1×8 + 2×4	Yes	May 11, 2014	$213	LGA; 1150	DMI 2.0; PCIe 3.0	Up to dual channel DDR3-1600
Mainstream	4 (4)	Core i5	4670K	HD 4600 (GT2)	3.4 GHz	3.8 GHz	350 MHz	1.2 GHz	6 MB	—N/a	84 W	1×16; 2×8; 1×8 + 2×4	No	June 2, 2013	$242	LGA; 1150	DMI 2.0; PCIe 3.0	Up to dual channel DDR3-1600
Mainstream	4 (4)	Core i5	4670	HD 4600 (GT2)	3.4 GHz	3.8 GHz	350 MHz	1.2 GHz	6 MB	—N/a	84 W	1×16; 2×8; 1×8 + 2×4	Yes	June 2, 2013	$213	LGA; 1150	DMI 2.0; PCIe 3.0	Up to dual channel DDR3-1600
Mainstream	4 (4)	Core i5	4670S	HD 4600 (GT2)	3.1 GHz	3.8 GHz	350 MHz	1.2 GHz	6 MB	—N/a	65 W	1×16; 2×8; 1×8 + 2×4	Yes	June 2, 2013	$213	LGA; 1150	DMI 2.0; PCIe 3.0	Up to dual channel DDR3-1600
Mainstream	4 (4)	Core i5	4670R	Iris Pro 5200 (GT3e)	3.0 GHz	3.7 GHz	200 MHz	1.3 GHz	4 MB	128 MB	65 W	1×16; 2×8; 1×8 + 2×4	Yes	June 2, 2013	$310	BGA; 1364	DMI 2.0; PCIe 3.0	Up to dual channel DDR3-1600
Mainstream	4 (4)	Core i5	4670T	HD 4600 (GT2)	2.3 GHz	3.3 GHz	350 MHz	1.2 GHz	6 MB	—N/a	45 W	1×16; 2×8; 1×8 + 2×4	Yes	June 2, 2013	$213	LGA; 1150	DMI 2.0; PCIe 3.0	Up to dual channel DDR3-1600
Mainstream	4 (4)	Core i5	4590	HD 4600 (GT2)	3.3 GHz	3.7 GHz	350 MHz	1.15 GHz	6 MB	—N/a	84 W	1×16; 2×8; 1×8 + 2×4	Yes	May 11, 2014	$192	LGA; 1150	DMI 2.0; PCIe 3.0	Up to dual channel DDR3-1600
Mainstream	4 (4)	Core i5	4590S	HD 4600 (GT2)	3.0 GHz	3.7 GHz	350 MHz	1.15 GHz	6 MB	—N/a	65 W	1×16; 2×8; 1×8 + 2×4	Yes	May 11, 2014	$192	LGA; 1150	DMI 2.0; PCIe 3.0	Up to dual channel DDR3-1600
Mainstream	4 (4)	Core i5	4590T	HD 4600 (GT2)	2.0 GHz	3.0 GHz	350 MHz	1.15 GHz	6 MB	—N/a	35 W	1×16; 2×8; 1×8 + 2×4	Yes	May 11, 2014	$192	LGA; 1150	DMI 2.0; PCIe 3.0	Up to dual channel DDR3-1600
Mainstream	4 (4)	Core i5	4570	HD 4600 (GT2)	3.2 GHz	3.6 GHz	350 MHz	1.15 GHz	6 MB	—N/a	84 W	1×16; 2×8; 1×8 + 2×4	Yes	June 2, 2013	$192	LGA; 1150	DMI 2.0; PCIe 3.0	Up to dual channel DDR3-1600
Mainstream	4 (4)	Core i5	4570S	HD 4600 (GT2)	2.9 GHz	3.6 GHz	350 MHz	1.15 GHz	6 MB	—N/a	65 W	1×16; 2×8; 1×8 + 2×4	Yes	June 2, 2013	$192	LGA; 1150	DMI 2.0; PCIe 3.0	Up to dual channel DDR3-1600
Mainstream	4 (4)	Core i5	4570R	Iris Pro 5200 (GT3e)	2.7 GHz	3.2 GHz	200 MHz	1.15 GHz	4 MB	128 MB	65 W	1×16; 2×8; 1×8 + 2×4	Yes	June 2, 2013	$288	BGA; 1364	DMI 2.0; PCIe 3.0	Up to dual channel DDR3-1600
Mainstream	2 (4)	Core i5	4570T	HD 4600 (GT2)	2.9 GHz	3.6 GHz	200 MHz	1.15 GHz	4 MB	—N/a	35 W	1×16; 2×8; 1×8 + 2×4	Yes	June 2, 2013	$192	LGA; 1150	DMI 2.0; PCIe 3.0	Up to dual channel DDR3-1600
Mainstream	2 (4)	Core i5	4570TE	HD 4600 (GT2)	2.7 GHz	3.3 GHz	350 MHz	1 GHz	4 MB	—N/a	35 W	1×16; 2×8; 1×8 + 2×4	Yes	June 2, 2013	$192	LGA; 1150	DMI 2.0; PCIe 3.0	Up to dual channel DDR3-1600
Mainstream	4 (4)	Core i5	4460	HD 4600 (GT2)	3.2 GHz	3.4 GHz	350 MHz	1.1 GHz	6 MB	—N/a	84 W	1×16; 2×8; 1×8 + 2×4	Yes	May 11, 2014	$182	LGA; 1150	DMI 2.0; PCIe 3.0	Up to dual channel DDR3-1600
Mainstream	4 (4)	Core i5	4460S	HD 4600 (GT2)	2.9 GHz	3.4 GHz	350 MHz	1.1 GHz	6 MB	—N/a	65 W	1×16; 2×8; 1×8 + 2×4	Yes	May 11, 2014	$182	LGA; 1150	DMI 2.0; PCIe 3.0	Up to dual channel DDR3-1600
Mainstream	4 (4)	Core i5	4460T	HD 4600 (GT2)	1.9 GHz	2.7 GHz	350 MHz	1.1 GHz	6 MB	—N/a	35 W	1×16; 2×8; 1×8 + 2×4	Yes	May 11, 2014	$182	LGA; 1150	DMI 2.0; PCIe 3.0	Up to dual channel DDR3-1600
Mainstream	4 (4)	Core i5	4440	HD 4600 (GT2)	3.1 GHz	3.3 GHz	350 MHz	1.1 GHz	6 MB	—N/a	84 W	1×16; 2×8; 1×8 + 2×4	Yes	September 1, 2013	$182	LGA; 1150	DMI 2.0; PCIe 3.0	Up to dual channel DDR3-1600
Mainstream	4 (4)	Core i5	4440S	HD 4600 (GT2)	2.8 GHz	3.3 GHz	350 MHz	1.1 GHz	6 MB	—N/a	65 W	1×16; 2×8; 1×8 + 2×4	Yes	September 1, 2013	$182	LGA; 1150	DMI 2.0; PCIe 3.0	Up to dual channel DDR3-1600
Mainstream	4 (4)	Core i5	4430	HD 4600 (GT2)	3.0 GHz	3.2 GHz	350 MHz	1.1 GHz	6 MB	—N/a	84 W	1×16; 2×8; 1×8 + 2×4	Yes	June 2, 2013	$182	LGA; 1150	DMI 2.0; PCIe 3.0	Up to dual channel DDR3-1600
Mainstream	4 (4)	Core i5	4430S	HD 4600 (GT2)	2.7 GHz	3.2 GHz	350 MHz	1.1 GHz	6 MB	—N/a	65 W	1×16; 2×8; 1×8 + 2×4	Yes	June 2, 2013	$182	LGA; 1150	DMI 2.0; PCIe 3.0	Up to dual channel DDR3-1600
Mainstream	2 (4)	Core i3	4370	HD 4600 (GT2)	3.8 GHz	—N/a	350 MHz	1.15 GHz	4 MB	—N/a	54 W	1×16; 2×8; 1×8 + 2×4	No	July 20, 2014	$149	LGA; 1150	DMI 2.0; PCIe 3.0	Up to dual channel DDR3-1600
Mainstream	2 (4)	Core i3	4360	HD 4600 (GT2)	3.7 GHz	—N/a	350 MHz	1.15 GHz	4 MB	—N/a	54 W	1×16; 2×8; 1×8 + 2×4	No	May 11, 2014	$149	LGA; 1150	DMI 2.0; PCIe 3.0	Up to dual channel DDR3-1600
Mainstream	2 (4)	Core i3	4350	HD 4600 (GT2)	3.6 GHz	—N/a	350 MHz	1.15 GHz	4 MB	—N/a	54 W	1×16; 2×8; 1×8 + 2×4	No	May 11, 2014	$138	LGA; 1150	DMI 2.0; PCIe 3.0	Up to dual channel DDR3-1600
Mainstream	2 (4)	Core i3	4340	HD 4600 (GT2)	3.6 GHz	—N/a	350 MHz	1.15 GHz	4 MB	—N/a	54 W	1×16; 2×8; 1×8 + 2×4	No	September 1, 2013	$149	LGA; 1150	DMI 2.0; PCIe 3.0	Up to dual channel DDR3-1600
Mainstream	2 (4)	Core i3	4330	HD 4600 (GT2)	3.5 GHz	—N/a	350 MHz	1.15 GHz	4 MB	—N/a	54 W	1×16; 2×8; 1×8 + 2×4	No	September 1, 2013	$138	LGA; 1150	DMI 2.0; PCIe 3.0	Up to dual channel DDR3-1600
Mainstream	2 (4)	Core i3	4370T	HD 4600 (GT2)	3.3 GHz	—N/a	200 MHz	1.15 GHz	4 MB	—N/a	35 W	1×16; 2×8; 1×8 + 2×4	No	March 30, 2015	$138	LGA; 1150	DMI 2.0; PCIe 3.0	Up to dual channel DDR3-1600
Mainstream	2 (4)	Core i3	4360T	HD 4600 (GT2)	3.2 GHz	—N/a	200 MHz	1.15 GHz	4 MB	—N/a	35 W	1×16; 2×8; 1×8 + 2×4	No	July 20, 2014	$138	LGA; 1150	DMI 2.0; PCIe 3.0	Up to dual channel DDR3-1600
Mainstream	2 (4)	Core i3	4350T	HD 4600 (GT2)	3.1 GHz	—N/a	200 MHz	1.15 GHz	4 MB	—N/a	35 W	1×16; 2×8; 1×8 + 2×4	No	May 11, 2014	$138	LGA; 1150	DMI 2.0; PCIe 3.0	Up to dual channel DDR3-1600
Mainstream	2 (4)	Core i3	4330T	HD 4600 (GT2)	3.0 GHz	—N/a	200 MHz	1.15 GHz	4 MB	—N/a	35 W	1×16; 2×8; 1×8 + 2×4	No	September 1, 2013	$138	LGA; 1150	DMI 2.0; PCIe 3.0	Up to dual channel DDR3-1600
Mainstream	2 (4)	Core i3	4340TE	HD 4600 (GT2)	2.6 GHz	—N/a	350 MHz	1 GHz	4 MB	—N/a	35 W	1×16; 2×8; 1×8 + 2×4	No	May 11, 2014	$138	LGA; 1150	DMI 2.0; PCIe 3.0	Up to dual channel DDR3-1600
Mainstream	2 (4)	Core i3	4330TE	HD 4600 (GT2)	2.4 GHz	—N/a	350 MHz	1 GHz	4 MB	—N/a	35 W	1×16; 2×8; 1×8 + 2×4	No	September 1, 2013	$122	LGA; 1150	DMI 2.0; PCIe 3.0	Up to dual channel DDR3-1600
Mainstream	2 (4)	Core i3	4170	HD 4400 (GT2)	3.7 GHz	—N/a	350 MHz	1.15 GHz	3 MB	—N/a	54 W	1×16; 2×8; 1×8 + 2×4	No	March 30, 2015	$117	LGA; 1150	DMI 2.0; PCIe 3.0	Up to dual channel DDR3-1600
Mainstream	2 (4)	Core i3	4160	HD 4400 (GT2)	3.6 GHz	—N/a	350 MHz	1.15 GHz	3 MB	—N/a	54 W	1×16; 2×8; 1×8 + 2×4	No	July 20, 2014	$117	LGA; 1150	DMI 2.0; PCIe 3.0	Up to dual channel DDR3-1600
Mainstream	2 (4)	Core i3	4150	HD 4400 (GT2)	3.5 GHz	—N/a	350 MHz	1.15 GHz	3 MB	—N/a	54 W	1×16; 2×8; 1×8 + 2×4	No	May 11, 2014	$117	LGA; 1150	DMI 2.0; PCIe 3.0	Up to dual channel DDR3-1600
Mainstream	2 (4)	Core i3	4130	HD 4400 (GT2)	3.4 GHz	—N/a	350 MHz	1.15 GHz	3 MB	—N/a	54 W	1×16; 2×8; 1×8 + 2×4	No	September 1, 2013	$122	LGA; 1150	DMI 2.0; PCIe 3.0	Up to dual channel DDR3-1600
Mainstream	2 (4)	Core i3	4170T	HD 4400 (GT2)	3.2 GHz	—N/a	200 MHz	1.15 GHz	3 MB	—N/a	35 W	1×16; 2×8; 1×8 + 2×4	No	March 30, 2015	$117	LGA; 1150	DMI 2.0; PCIe 3.0	Up to dual channel DDR3-1600
Mainstream	2 (4)	Core i3	4160T	HD 4400 (GT2)	3.1 GHz	—N/a	200 MHz	1.15 GHz	3 MB	—N/a	35 W	1×16; 2×8; 1×8 + 2×4	No	July 20, 2014	$117	LGA; 1150	DMI 2.0; PCIe 3.0	Up to dual channel DDR3-1600
Mainstream	2 (4)	Core i3	4150T	HD 4400 (GT2)	3.0 GHz	—N/a	200 MHz	1.15 GHz	3 MB	—N/a	35 W	1×16; 2×8; 1×8 + 2×4	No	May 11, 2014	$117	LGA; 1150	DMI 2.0; PCIe 3.0	Up to dual channel DDR3-1600
Mainstream	2 (4)	Core i3	4130T	HD 4400 (GT2)	2.9 GHz	—N/a	200 MHz	1.15 GHz	3 MB	—N/a	35 W	1×16; 2×8; 1×8 + 2×4	No	September 1, 2013	$122	LGA; 1150	DMI 2.0; PCIe 3.0	Up to dual channel DDR3-1600
Budget	2 (2)	Pentium	G3470	HD Graphics (GT1)	3.6 GHz	—N/a	350 MHz	1.1 GHz	3 MB	—N/a	53 W	1×16; 2×8; 1×8 + 2×4	No	March 30, 2015	$86	LGA; 1150	DMI 2.0; PCIe 3.0	Up to dual channel DDR3-1600
Budget	2 (2)	Pentium	G3460	HD Graphics (GT1)	3.5 GHz	—N/a	350 MHz	1.1 GHz	3 MB	—N/a	53 W	1×16; 2×8; 1×8 + 2×4	No	July 20, 2014	$86	LGA; 1150	DMI 2.0; PCIe 3.0	Up to dual channel DDR3-1600
Budget	2 (2)	Pentium	G3450	HD Graphics (GT1)	3.4 GHz	—N/a	350 MHz	1.1 GHz	3 MB	—N/a	53 W	1×16; 2×8; 1×8 + 2×4	No	May 11, 2014	$86	LGA; 1150	DMI 2.0; PCIe 3.0	Up to dual channel DDR3-1600
Budget	2 (2)	Pentium	G3440	HD Graphics (GT1)	3.3 GHz	—N/a	350 MHz	1.1 GHz	3 MB	—N/a	53 W	1×16; 2×8; 1×8 + 2×4	No	May 11, 2014	$75	LGA; 1150	DMI 2.0; PCIe 3.0	Up to dual channel DDR3-1600
Budget	2 (2)	Pentium	G3430	HD Graphics (GT1)	3.3 GHz	—N/a	350 MHz	1.1 GHz	3 MB	—N/a	53 W	1×16; 2×8; 1×8 + 2×4	No	December 1, 2013	$86	LGA; 1150	DMI 2.0; PCIe 3.0	Up to dual channel DDR3-1600
Budget	2 (2)	Pentium	G3420	HD Graphics (GT1)	3.2 GHz	—N/a	350 MHz	1.1 GHz	3 MB	—N/a	53 W	1×16; 2×8; 1×8 + 2×4	No	December 1, 2013	$75	LGA; 1150	DMI 2.0; PCIe 3.0	Up to dual channel DDR3-1600
Budget	2 (2)	Pentium	G3460T	HD Graphics (GT1)	3.0 GHz	—N/a	200 MHz	1.1 GHz	3 MB	—N/a	35 W	1×16; 2×8; 1×8 + 2×4	No	March 30, 2015	$75	LGA; 1150	DMI 2.0; PCIe 3.0	Up to dual channel DDR3-1600
Budget	2 (2)	Pentium	G3450T	HD Graphics (GT1)	2.9 GHz	—N/a	200 MHz	1.1 GHz	3 MB	—N/a	35 W	1×16; 2×8; 1×8 + 2×4	No	July 20, 2014	$75	LGA; 1150	DMI 2.0; PCIe 3.0	Up to dual channel DDR3-1600
Budget	2 (2)	Pentium	G3440T	HD Graphics (GT1)	2.8 GHz	—N/a	200 MHz	1.1 GHz	3 MB	—N/a	35 W	1×16; 2×8; 1×8 + 2×4	No	May 11, 2014	$75	LGA; 1150	DMI 2.0; PCIe 3.0	Up to dual channel DDR3-1600
Budget	2 (2)	Pentium	G3420T	HD Graphics (GT1)	2.7 GHz	—N/a	200 MHz	1.1 GHz	3 MB	—N/a	35 W	1×16; 2×8; 1×8 + 2×4	No	December 1, 2013	$75	LGA; 1150	DMI 2.0; PCIe 3.0	Up to dual channel DDR3-1600
Budget	2 (2)	Pentium	G3320TE	HD Graphics (GT1)	2.3 GHz	—N/a	350 MHz	1 GHz	3 MB	—N/a	35 W	1×16; 2×8; 1×8 + 2×4	No	December 1, 2013	$75	LGA; 1150	DMI 2.0; PCIe 3.0	Up to dual channel DDR3-1333
Budget	2 (2)	Pentium	G3260	HD Graphics (GT1)	3.3 GHz	—N/a	350 MHz	1.1 GHz	3 MB	—N/a	53 W	1×16; 2×8; 1×8 + 2×4	No	March 30, 2015	$64	LGA; 1150	DMI 2.0; PCIe 3.0	Up to dual channel DDR3-1333
Budget	2 (2)	Pentium	G3258^{[c]}	HD Graphics (GT1)	3.2 GHz	—N/a	350 MHz	1.1 GHz	3 MB	—N/a	53 W	1×16; 2×8; 1×8 + 2×4	No	June 2, 2014	$72	LGA; 1150	DMI 2.0; PCIe 3.0	Up to dual channel DDR3-1333
Budget	2 (2)	Pentium	G3250	HD Graphics (GT1)	3.2 GHz	—N/a	350 MHz	1.1 GHz	3 MB	—N/a	53 W	1×16; 2×8; 1×8 + 2×4	No	July 20, 2014	$64	LGA; 1150	DMI 2.0; PCIe 3.0	Up to dual channel DDR3-1333
Budget	2 (2)	Pentium	G3240	HD Graphics (GT1)	3.1 GHz	—N/a	350 MHz	1.1 GHz	3 MB	—N/a	53 W	1×16; 2×8; 1×8 + 2×4	No	May 11, 2014	$64	LGA; 1150	DMI 2.0; PCIe 3.0	Up to dual channel DDR3-1333
Budget	2 (2)	Pentium	G3220	HD Graphics (GT1)	3.0 GHz	—N/a	350 MHz	1.1 GHz	3 MB	—N/a	53 W	1×16; 2×8; 1×8 + 2×4	No	December 1, 2013	$64	LGA; 1150	DMI 2.0; PCIe 3.0	Up to dual channel DDR3-1333
Budget	2 (2)	Pentium	G3260T	HD Graphics (GT1)	2.9 GHz	—N/a	200 MHz	1.1 GHz	3 MB	—N/a	35 W	1×16; 2×8; 1×8 + 2×4	No	March 30, 2015	$64	LGA; 1150	DMI 2.0; PCIe 3.0	Up to dual channel DDR3-1333
Budget	2 (2)	Pentium	G3250T	HD Graphics (GT1)	2.8 GHz	—N/a	200 MHz	1.1 GHz	3 MB	—N/a	35 W	1×16; 2×8; 1×8 + 2×4	No	July 20, 2014	$64	LGA; 1150	DMI 2.0; PCIe 3.0	Up to dual channel DDR3-1333
Budget	2 (2)	Pentium	G3240T	HD Graphics (GT1)	2.7 GHz	—N/a	200 MHz	1.1 GHz	3 MB	—N/a	35 W	1×16; 2×8; 1×8 + 2×4	No	May 11, 2014	$64	LGA; 1150	DMI 2.0; PCIe 3.0	Up to dual channel DDR3-1333
Budget	2 (2)	Pentium	G3220T	HD Graphics (GT1)	2.6 GHz	—N/a	200 MHz	1.1 GHz	3 MB	—N/a	35 W	1×16; 2×8; 1×8 + 2×4	No	December 1, 2013	$64	LGA; 1150	DMI 2.0; PCIe 3.0	Up to dual channel DDR3-1333
Budget	2 (2)	Celeron	G1850	HD Graphics (GT1)	2.9 GHz	—N/a	350 MHz	1.05 GHz	2 MB	—N/a	53 W	1×16; 2×8; 1×8 + 2×4	No	May 11, 2014	$52	LGA; 1150	DMI 2.0; PCIe 3.0	Up to dual channel DDR3-1333
Budget	2 (2)	Celeron	G1840	HD Graphics (GT1)	2.8 GHz	—N/a	350 MHz	1.05 GHz	2 MB	—N/a	53 W	1×16; 2×8; 1×8 + 2×4	No	May 11, 2014	$42	LGA; 1150	DMI 2.0; PCIe 3.0	Up to dual channel DDR3-1333
Budget	2 (2)	Celeron	G1830	HD Graphics (GT1)	2.8 GHz	—N/a	350 MHz	1.05 GHz	2 MB	—N/a	53 W	1×16; 2×8; 1×8 + 2×4	No	December 1, 2013	$52	LGA; 1150	DMI 2.0; PCIe 3.0	Up to dual channel DDR3-1333
Budget	2 (2)	Celeron	G1820	HD Graphics (GT1)	2.7 GHz	—N/a	350 MHz	1.05 GHz	2 MB	—N/a	53 W	1×16; 2×8; 1×8 + 2×4	No	December 1, 2013	$42	LGA; 1150	DMI 2.0; PCIe 3.0	Up to dual channel DDR3-1333
Budget	2 (2)	Celeron	G1840T	HD Graphics (GT1)	2.5 GHz	—N/a	200 MHz	1.05 GHz	2 MB	—N/a	35 W	1×16; 2×8; 1×8 + 2×4	No	May 11, 2014	$42	LGA; 1150	DMI 2.0; PCIe 3.0	Up to dual channel DDR3-1333
Budget	2 (2)	Celeron	G1820T	HD Graphics (GT1)	2.4 GHz	—N/a	200 MHz	1.05 GHz	2 MB	—N/a	35 W	1×16; 2×8; 1×8 + 2×4	No	December 1, 2013	$42	LGA; 1150	DMI 2.0; PCIe 3.0	Up to dual channel DDR3-1333
Budget	2 (2)	Celeron	G1820TE	HD Graphics (GT1)	2.2 GHz	—N/a	200 MHz	1 GHz	2 MB	—N/a	35 W	1×16; 2×8; 1×8 + 2×4	No	December 1, 2013	$42	LGA; 1150	DMI 2.0; PCIe 3.0	Up to dual channel DDR3-1333

^{a} Some of these configurations could be disabled by the chipset. For example, H-series chipsets disable all PCIe 3.0 lane configurations except 1×16.
^{b} This feature also requires a chipset that supports VT-d like the Q87 chipset or the X99 chipset.
^{c} This is called 20th Anniversary Edition and has an unlocked multiplier.

SKU suffixes to denote:

- K – unlocked (adjustable CPU multiplier up to 63x)
  - The Pentium G3258 CPU is unlocked despite not having the K-suffix.
- S – performance-optimized lifestyle (low power with 65 W TDP)
- T – power-optimized lifestyle (ultra low power with 35–45 W TDP)
- R – BGA packaging / High-performance GPU (Iris Pro 5200 (GT3e))
- X – extreme edition (adjustable CPU ratio with no ratio limit)

=== Server processors ===
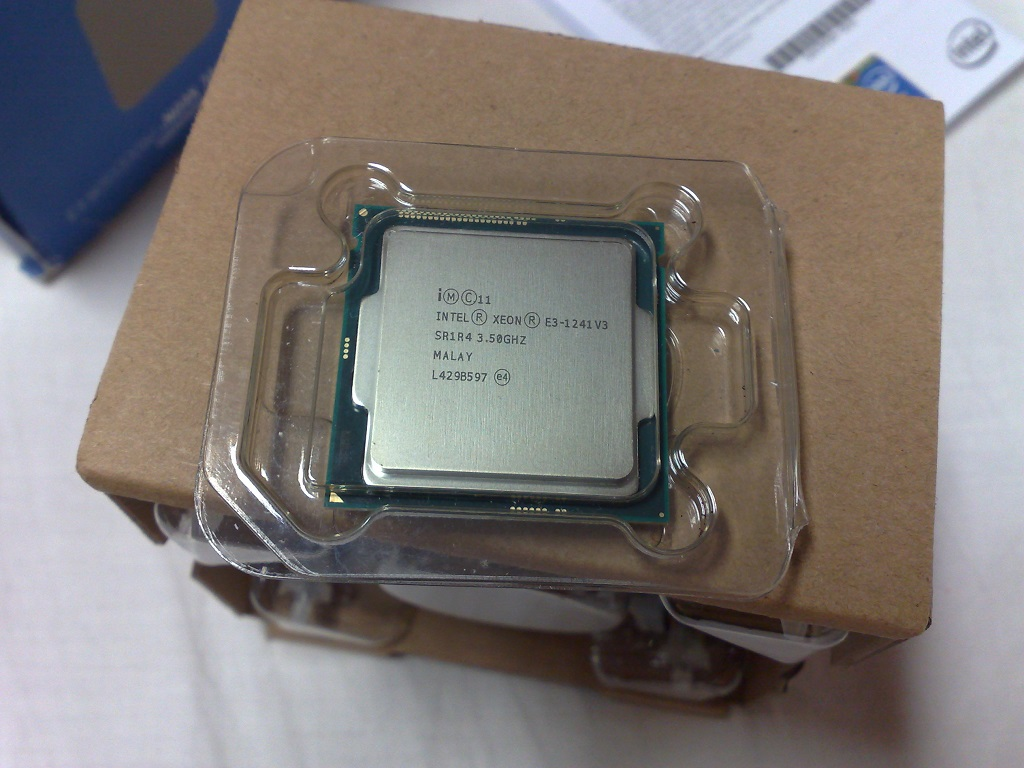
Intel Xeon E3-1241 v3 CPU, on top of its original packaging with an OEM fan-cooled heatsink

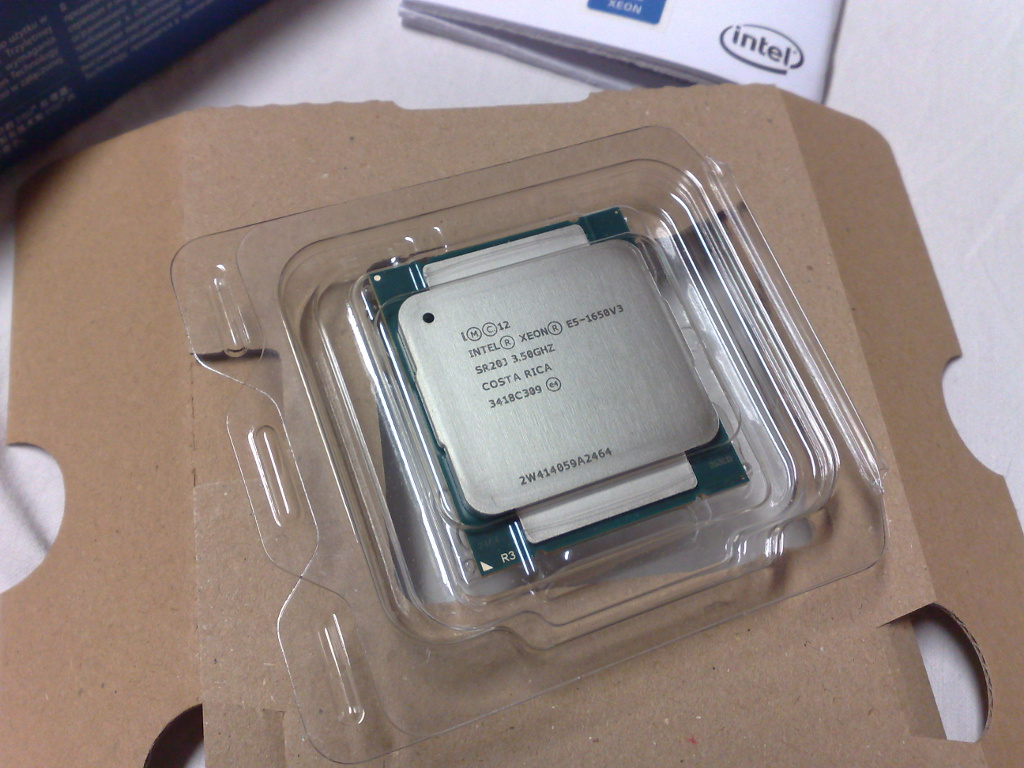
Intel Xeon E5-1650 v3 CPU; its retail box contains no OEM heatsink

- All models support: MMX, SSE, SSE2, SSE3, SSSE3, SSE4.1, SSE4.2, AVX, AVX2, FMA3, F16C, BMI (Bit Manipulation Instructions 1)+BMI2, Enhanced Intel SpeedStep Technology (EIST), Intel 64, XD bit (an NX bit implementation), TXT, Intel vPro, Intel VT-x, Intel VT-d, hyper-threading (except E3-1220 v3 and E3-1225 v3), Turbo Boost 2.0, AES-NI, and Smart Cache.
- Haswell-EX models (E7-48xx/88xx v3) support TSX, while for Haswell-E, Haswell-WS (E3-12xx v3) and Haswell-EP (E5-16xx/26xx v3) models it was disabled via a microcode update in August 2014, due to a bug that was discovered in the TSX implementation.
- Transistors: 5.56 billion
- Die size: 661 mm^{2}

The first digit of the model number designates the largest supported multi-socket configuration; thus, E5-26xx v3 models support up to dual-socket configurations, while the E7-48xx v3 and E7-88xx v3 models support up to quad- and eight-socket configurations, respectively. Also, E5-16xx/26xx v3 and E7-48xx/88xx v3 models have no integrated GPU.

Lists of launched server processors are below, split between Haswell E3-12xx v3, E5-16xx/26xx v3 and E7-48xx/88xx v3 models.

Haswell E7-48xx/88xx v3 SKUs
Target segment	Cores (threads)	Processor branding and model		CPU clock rate		L3 cache	TDP	Release date	Release price (USD)	Motherboard		
Target segment	Cores (threads)	Processor branding and model		Normal	Turbo	L3 cache	TDP	Release date	Release price (USD)	Socket	Interface	Memory
Server	4 (8)	Xeon E7 v3	E7-8893v3	3.2 GHz	3.5 GHz	45 MB	140 W	May 2015	$6,841	LGA; 2011-1	QPI (up to 9.6 GT/s (Note: Maximum QPI speed depends on the CPU model.)); DMI 2.0; PCIe 3.0	Up to DDR4-1866 or DDR3-1600
Server	10 (20)	Xeon E7 v3	E7-8891v3	2.8 GHz	3.5 GHz	45 MB	165 W	May 2015	$6,841	LGA; 2011-1	QPI (up to 9.6 GT/s); DMI 2.0; PCIe 3.0	Up to DDR4-1866 or DDR3-1600
Server	18 (36)	Xeon E7 v3	E7-8890v3	2.5 GHz	3.3 GHz	45 MB	165 W	May 2015	$7,174	LGA; 2011-1	QPI (up to 9.6 GT/s); DMI 2.0; PCIe 3.0	Up to DDR4-1866 or DDR3-1600
Server	18 (36)	Xeon E7 v3	E7-8880v3	2.3 GHz	3.1 GHz	45 MB	150 W	May 2015	$5,895	LGA; 2011-1	QPI (up to 9.6 GT/s); DMI 2.0; PCIe 3.0	Up to DDR4-1866 or DDR3-1600
Server	18 (36)	Xeon E7 v3	E7-8880Lv3	2.0 GHz	2.8 GHz	45 MB	115 W	May 2015	$6,063	LGA; 2011-1	QPI (up to 9.6 GT/s); DMI 2.0; PCIe 3.0	Up to DDR4-1866 or DDR3-1600
Server	18 (36)	Xeon E7 v3	E7-8870v3	2.1 GHz	2.9 GHz	45 MB	140 W	May 2015	$4,672	LGA; 2011-1	QPI (up to 9.6 GT/s); DMI 2.0; PCIe 3.0	Up to DDR4-1866 or DDR3-1600
Server	16 (32)	Xeon E7 v3	E7-8867v3	2.5 GHz	3.3 GHz	45 MB	165 W	May 2015	$4,672	LGA; 2011-1	QPI (up to 9.6 GT/s); DMI 2.0; PCIe 3.0	Up to DDR4-1866 or DDR3-1600
Server	16 (32)	Xeon E7 v3	E7-8860v3	2.2 GHz	3.2 GHz	40 MB	165 W	May 2015	$4,061	LGA; 2011-1	QPI (up to 9.6 GT/s); DMI 2.0; PCIe 3.0	Up to DDR4-1866 or DDR3-1600
Server	14 (28)	Xeon E7 v3	E7-4850v3	2.2 GHz	2.8 GHz	35 MB	115 W	May 2015	$3,003	LGA; 2011-1	QPI (up to 9.6 GT/s); DMI 2.0; PCIe 3.0	Up to DDR4-1866 or DDR3-1600
Server	12 (24)	Xeon E7 v3	E7-4830v3	2.1 GHz	2.7 GHz	30 MB	115 W	May 2015	$2,170	LGA; 2011-1	QPI (up to 9.6 GT/s); DMI 2.0; PCIe 3.0	Up to DDR4-1866 or DDR3-1600
Server	10 (20)	Xeon E7 v3	E7-4820v3	1.9 GHz	—N/a	25 MB	115 W	May 2015	$1,502	LGA; 2011-1	QPI (up to 9.6 GT/s); DMI 2.0; PCIe 3.0	Up to DDR4-1866 or DDR3-1600
Server	8 (16)	Xeon E7 v3	E7-4809v3	2.0 GHz	—N/a	25 MB	115 W	May 2015	$1,502	LGA; 2011-1	QPI (up to 9.6 GT/s); DMI 2.0; PCIe 3.0	Up to DDR4-1866 or DDR3-1600

Haswell E5-16xx/26xx v3 SKUs
Target segment	Cores (threads)	Processor branding and model		CPU clock rate		CPU AVX clock rate		L3 cache	TDP	Release date	Release price (USD) tray / box	Motherboard		
Target segment	Cores (threads)	Processor branding and model		Normal	Turbo	Normal	Turbo	L3 cache	TDP	Release date	Release price (USD) tray / box	Socket	Interface	Memory
Server	18 (36)	Xeon E5 v3	2699v3	2.3 GHz	3.6 GHz	1.9 GHz	3.3 GHz	45 MB	145 W	September 9, 2014	—N/a	LGA; 2011-3	QPI (up to 9.6 GT/s); DMI 2.0; PCIe 3.0	up to DDR4-2133
Server	16 (32)	Xeon E5 v3	2698v3	2.3 GHz	3.6 GHz	1.9 GHz	3.3 GHz	40 MB	135 W	September 9, 2014	—N/a	LGA; 2011-3	QPI (up to 9.6 GT/s); DMI 2.0; PCIe 3.0	up to DDR4-2133
Server	16 (32)	Xeon E5 v3	2698Av3	2.8 GHz	3.2 GHz	2.3 GHz	2.9 GHz	40 MB	165 W	November 2014	OEM	LGA; 2011-3	QPI (up to 9.6 GT/s); DMI 2.0; PCIe 3.0	up to DDR4-2133
Server	14 (28)	Xeon E5 v3	2697v3	2.6 GHz	3.6 GHz	2.2 GHz	3.3 GHz	35 MB	145 W	September 9, 2014	$2,702 / $2,706	LGA; 2011-3	QPI (up to 9.6 GT/s); DMI 2.0; PCIe 3.0	up to DDR4-2133
Server	14 (28)	Xeon E5 v3	2695v3	2.3 GHz	3.3 GHz	1.9 GHz	3.0 GHz	35 MB	120 W	September 9, 2014	$2,424 / $2,428	LGA; 2011-3	QPI (up to 9.6 GT/s); DMI 2.0; PCIe 3.0	up to DDR4-2133
Server	12 (24)	Xeon E5 v3	2690v3	2.6 GHz	3.5 GHz	2.3 GHz	3.2 GHz	30 MB	135 W	September 9, 2014	$2,090 / $2,094	LGA; 2011-3	QPI (up to 9.6 GT/s); DMI 2.0; PCIe 3.0	up to DDR4-2133
Server	14 (28)	Xeon E5 v3	2683v3	2.0 GHz	3.0 GHz	1.7 GHz	2.7 GHz	35 MB	120 W	September 9, 2014	$1,846 / —	LGA; 2011-3	QPI (up to 9.6 GT/s); DMI 2.0; PCIe 3.0	up to DDR4-2133
Server	12 (24)	Xeon E5 v3	2680v3	2.5 GHz	3.3 GHz	2.1 GHz	3.1 GHz	30 MB	120 W	September 9, 2014	$1,745 / $1,749	LGA; 2011-3	QPI (up to 9.6 GT/s); DMI 2.0; PCIe 3.0	up to DDR4-2133
Server	12 (24)	Xeon E5 v3	2673v3 (Note: Unconfirmed details may differ from surrounding models.)	2.4 GHz	3.1 GHz			30 MB	105 W	September 9, 2014		LGA; 2011-3	QPI (up to 9.6 GT/s); DMI 2.0; PCIe 3.0	up to DDR4-2133
Server	12 (24)	Xeon E5 v3	2670v3	2.3 GHz	3.1 GHz	2.0 GHz	2.9 GHz	30 MB	120 W	September 9, 2014	$1,589 / $1,593	LGA; 2011-3	QPI (up to 9.6 GT/s); DMI 2.0; PCIe 3.0	up to DDR4-2133
Server	8 (16)	Xeon E5 v3	2667v3	3.2 GHz	3.6 GHz	2.7 GHz	3.5 GHz	20 MB	135 W	September 9, 2014	$2,057 / —	LGA; 2011-3	QPI (up to 9.6 GT/s); DMI 2.0; PCIe 3.0	up to DDR4-2133
Server	10 (20)	Xeon E5 v3	2660v3	2.6 GHz	3.3 GHz	2.2 GHz	3.1 GHz	25 MB	105 W	September 9, 2014	$1,445 / $1,449	LGA; 2011-3	QPI (up to 9.6 GT/s); DMI 2.0; PCIe 3.0	up to DDR4-2133
Server	12 (24)	Xeon E5 v3	2650Lv3	1.8 GHz	2.5 GHz	1.5 GHz	2.3 GHz	30 MB	65 W	September 9, 2014	$1,329 / —	LGA; 2011-3	QPI (up to 9.6 GT/s); DMI 2.0; PCIe 3.0	up to DDR4-2133
Server	12 (24)	Xeon E5 v3	2658v3	2.2 GHz	2.9 GHz	1.9 GHz	3.0 GHz	30 MB	105 W	September 9, 2014	$1,832 / —	LGA; 2011-3	QPI (up to 9.6 GT/s); DMI 2.0; PCIe 3.0	up to DDR4-2133
Server	10 (20)	Xeon E5 v3	2650v3	2.3 GHz	3.0 GHz	2.0 GHz	2.8 GHz	25 MB	105 W	September 9, 2014	$1,166 / $1,171	LGA; 2011-3	QPI (up to 9.6 GT/s); DMI 2.0; PCIe 3.0	up to DDR4-2133
Server	12 (24)	Xeon E5 v3	2648Lv3	1.8 GHz	2.5 GHz	1.5 GHz	2.2 GHz	30 MB	75 W	September 9, 2014	$1,544 / —	LGA; 2011-3	QPI (up to 9.6 GT/s); DMI 2.0; PCIe 3.0	up to DDR4-2133
Server	6 (12)	Xeon E5 v3	2643v3	3.4 GHz	3.7 GHz	2.8 GHz	3.6 GHz	20 MB	135 W	September 9, 2014	$1,552 / —	LGA; 2011-3	QPI (up to 9.6 GT/s); DMI 2.0; PCIe 3.0	up to DDR4-2133
Server	8 (16)	Xeon E5 v3	2640v3	2.6 GHz	3.4 GHz	2.2 GHz	3.4 GHz	20 MB	90 W	September 9, 2014	$939 / $944	LGA; 2011-3	QPI (up to 9.6 GT/s); DMI 2.0; PCIe 3.0	up to DDR4-1866
Server	4 (8)	Xeon E5 v3	2637v3	3.5 GHz	3.7 GHz	3.2 GHz	3.6 GHz	15 MB	135 W	September 9, 2014	$996 / —	LGA; 2011-3	QPI (up to 9.6 GT/s); DMI 2.0; PCIe 3.0	up to DDR4-2133
Server	8 (16)	Xeon E5 v3	2630v3	2.4 GHz	3.2 GHz	2.1 GHz	3.2 GHz	20 MB	85 W	September 9, 2014	$667 / $671	LGA; 2011-3	QPI (up to 9.6 GT/s); DMI 2.0; PCIe 3.0	up to DDR4-1866
Server	8 (16)	Xeon E5 v3	2630Lv3	1.8 GHz	2.9 GHz	1.5 GHz	2.9 GHz	20 MB	55 W	September 9, 2014	$612 / —	LGA; 2011-3	QPI (up to 9.6 GT/s); DMI 2.0; PCIe 3.0	up to DDR4-1866
Server	10 (20)	Xeon E5 v3	2628Lv3	2.0 GHz	2.5 GHz	1.7 GHz	2.4 GHz	25 MB	75 W	September 9, 2014	$1,364 / —	LGA; 2011-3	QPI (up to 9.6 GT/s); DMI 2.0; PCIe 3.0	up to DDR4-1866
Server	4 (8)	Xeon E5 v3	2623v3	3.0 GHz	3.5 GHz	2.7 GHz	3.5 GHz	10 MB	105 W	September 9, 2014	$444 / —	LGA; 2011-3	QPI (up to 9.6 GT/s); DMI 2.0; PCIe 3.0	up to DDR4-1866
Server	6 (12)	Xeon E5 v3	2620v3	2.4 GHz	3.2 GHz	2.1 GHz	3.2 GHz	15 MB	85 W	September 9, 2014	$417 / $422	LGA; 2011-3	QPI (up to 9.6 GT/s); DMI 2.0; PCIe 3.0	up to DDR4-1866
Server	8 (16)	Xeon E5 v3	2618Lv3	2.3 GHz	3.4 GHz	1.9 GHz	3.4 GHz	20 MB	75 W	September 9, 2014	$779 / —	LGA; 2011-3	QPI (up to 9.6 GT/s); DMI 2.0; PCIe 3.0	up to DDR4-1866
Server	6 (6)	Xeon E5 v3	2609v3	1.9 GHz	—N/a	1.9 GHz	—N/a	15 MB	85 W	September 9, 2014	$306 / $306	LGA; 2011-3	QPI (up to 9.6 GT/s); DMI 2.0; PCIe 3.0	up to DDR4-1600
Server	6 (12)	Xeon E5 v3	2608Lv3	2.0 GHz	—N/a	1.7 GHz	—N/a	15 MB	52 W	September 9, 2014	$441 / —	LGA; 2011-3	QPI (up to 9.6 GT/s); DMI 2.0; PCIe 3.0	up to DDR4-1866
Server	6 (6)	Xeon E5 v3	2603v3	1.6 GHz	—N/a	1.3 GHz	—N/a	15 MB	85 W	September 9, 2014	$213 / $217	LGA; 2011-3	QPI (up to 9.6 GT/s); DMI 2.0; PCIe 3.0	up to DDR4-1600
Workstation	10 (20)	Xeon E5 v3	2687Wv3	3.1 GHz	3.5 GHz	2.7 GHz	3.5 GHz	25 MB	160 W	September 9, 2014	$2,141 / $2,145	LGA; 2011-3	QPI (up to 9.6 GT/s); DMI 2.0; PCIe 3.0	up to DDR4-2133
Workstation	8 (16)	Xeon E5 v3	1680v3	3.2 GHz	3.8 GHz	2.9 GHz	3.4 GHz	20 MB	140 W	September 9, 2014	$1,723 / —	LGA; 2011-3	DMI 2.0; PCIe 3.0	up to DDR4-2133
Workstation	8 (16)	Xeon E5 v3	1660v3	3.0 GHz	3.5 GHz	2.7 GHz	3.5 GHz	20 MB	140 W	September 9, 2014	$1,080 / —	LGA; 2011-3	DMI 2.0; PCIe 3.0	up to DDR4-2133
Workstation	6 (12)	Xeon E5 v3	1650v3	3.5 GHz	3.8 GHz	3.2 GHz	3.7 GHz	15 MB	140 W	September 9, 2014	$583 / $586	LGA; 2011-3	DMI 2.0; PCIe 3.0	up to DDR4-2133
Workstation	4 (8)	Xeon E5 v3	1630v3	3.7 GHz	3.8 GHz	3.4 GHz	3.7 GHz	10 MB	140 W	September 9, 2014	$372 / —	LGA; 2011-3	DMI 2.0; PCIe 3.0	up to DDR4-2133
Workstation	4 (8)	Xeon E5 v3	1620v3	3.5 GHz	3.6 GHz	3.2 GHz	3.5 GHz	10 MB	140 W	September 9, 2014	$294 / $297	LGA; 2011-3	DMI 2.0; PCIe 3.0	up to DDR4-2133
Workstation	4 (4)	Xeon E5 v3	1607v3	3.1 GHz	—N/a	2.8 GHz	—N/a	10 MB	140 W	September 9, 2014	$255 / —	LGA; 2011-3	DMI 2.0; PCIe 3.0	up to DDR4-1866
Workstation	4 (4)	Xeon E5 v3	1603v3	2.8 GHz	—N/a	2.5 GHz	—N/a	10 MB	140 W	September 9, 2014	$202 / —	LGA; 2011-3	DMI 2.0; PCIe 3.0	up to DDR4-1866

Haswell E3-12xx v3 SKUs
Target segment	Cores (threads)	Processor branding and model		GPU model	CPU clock rate		Graphics clock rate		L3 cache	GPU eDRAM	TDP	Release date	Release price (USD) tray / box	Motherboard		
Target segment	Cores (threads)	Processor branding and model		GPU model	Normal	Turbo	Normal	Turbo	L3 cache	GPU eDRAM	TDP	Release date	Release price (USD) tray / box	Socket	Interface	Memory
Server	4 (8)	Xeon E3 v3	1286v3	HD P4700 (GT2)	3.7 GHz	4.1 GHz	350 MHz	1.3 GHz	8 MB	—N/a	84 W	May 11, 2014	$662 / —	LGA; 1150	DMI 2.0; PCIe 3.0	up to dual channel DDR3-1600 with ECC
Server	4 (8)	Xeon E3 v3	1286Lv3	HD P4700 (GT2)	3.2 GHz	4.0 GHz	350 MHz	1.25 GHz	8 MB	—N/a	65 W	May 11, 2014	$774 / —	LGA; 1150	DMI 2.0; PCIe 3.0	up to dual channel DDR3-1600 with ECC
Server	4 (8)	Xeon E3 v3	1285v3	HD P4700 (GT2)	3.6 GHz	4.0 GHz	350 MHz	1.3 GHz	8 MB	—N/a	84 W	June 2, 2013	$662 / —	LGA; 1150	DMI 2.0; PCIe 3.0	up to dual channel DDR3-1600 with ECC
Server	4 (8)	Xeon E3 v3	1285Lv3	HD P4700 (GT2)	3.1 GHz	3.9 GHz	350 MHz	1.25 GHz	8 MB	—N/a	65 W	June 2, 2013	$774 / —	LGA; 1150	DMI 2.0; PCIe 3.0	up to dual channel DDR3-1600 with ECC
Server	4 (8)	Xeon E3 v3	1284Lv3	Iris Pro 5200 (GT3e)	1.8 GHz	3.2 GHz	750 MHz	1 GHz	6 MB	128 MB	47 W	February 18, 2014	OEM	BGA; 1364	DMI 2.0; PCIe 3.0	up to dual channel DDR3-1600 with ECC
Server	4 (8)	Xeon E3 v3	1281v3	—N/a	3.7 GHz	4.1 GHz	—N/a		8 MB	—N/a	82 W	May 11, 2014	$612 / —	LGA; 1150	DMI 2.0; PCIe 3.0	up to dual channel DDR3-1600 with ECC
Server	4 (8)	Xeon E3 v3	1280v3	—N/a	3.6 GHz	4.0 GHz	—N/a		8 MB	—N/a	82 W	June 2, 2013	$612 / —	LGA; 1150	DMI 2.0; PCIe 3.0	up to dual channel DDR3-1600 with ECC
Server	4 (8)	Xeon E3 v3	1276v3	HD P4600 (GT2)	3.6 GHz	4.0 GHz	350 MHz	1.25 GHz	8 MB	—N/a	84 W	May 11, 2014	$339 / $350	LGA; 1150	DMI 2.0; PCIe 3.0	up to dual channel DDR3-1600 with ECC
Server	4 (8)	Xeon E3 v3	1275v3	HD P4600 (GT2)	3.5 GHz	3.9 GHz	350 MHz	1.25 GHz	8 MB	—N/a	84 W	June 2, 2013	$339 / $350	LGA; 1150	DMI 2.0; PCIe 3.0	up to dual channel DDR3-1600 with ECC
Server	4 (8)	Xeon E3 v3	1275Lv3	HD (GT1)	2.7 GHz	3.9 GHz	350 MHz	1.2 GHz	8 MB	—N/a	45 W	May 11, 2014	$328 / —	LGA; 1150	DMI 2.0; PCIe 3.0	up to dual channel DDR3-1600 with ECC
Server	4 (8)	Xeon E3 v3	1271v3	—N/a	3.6 GHz	4.0 GHz	—N/a		8 MB	—N/a	80 W	May 11, 2014	$328 / $339	LGA; 1150	DMI 2.0; PCIe 3.0	up to dual channel DDR3-1600 with ECC
Server	4 (8)	Xeon E3 v3	1270v3	—N/a	3.5 GHz	3.9 GHz	—N/a		8 MB	—N/a	80 W	June 2, 2013	$328 / $339	LGA; 1150	DMI 2.0; PCIe 3.0	up to dual channel DDR3-1600 with ECC
Server	4 (8)	Xeon E3 v3	1268Lv3	HD P4600 (GT2)	2.3 GHz	3.3 GHz	350 MHz	1 GHz	8 MB	—N/a	45 W	June 2, 2013	$310 / —	LGA; 1150	DMI 2.0; PCIe 3.0	up to dual channel DDR3-1600 with ECC
Server	4 (8)	Xeon E3 v3	1265Lv3	HD (GT1)	2.5 GHz	3.7 GHz	350 MHz	1.2 GHz	8 MB	—N/a	45 W	June 2, 2013	$294 / —	LGA; 1150	DMI 2.0; PCIe 3.0	up to dual channel DDR3-1600 with ECC
Server	4 (8)	Xeon E3 v3	1246v3	HD P4600 (GT2)	3.5 GHz	3.9 GHz	350 MHz	1.2 GHz	8 MB	—N/a	84 W	May 11, 2014	$276 / $287	LGA; 1150	DMI 2.0; PCIe 3.0	up to dual channel DDR3-1600 with ECC
Server	4 (8)	Xeon E3 v3	1245v3	HD P4600 (GT2)	3.4 GHz	3.8 GHz	350 MHz	1.2 GHz	8 MB	—N/a	84 W	June 2, 2013	$276 / $287	LGA; 1150	DMI 2.0; PCIe 3.0	up to dual channel DDR3-1600 with ECC
Server	4 (8)	Xeon E3 v3	1241v3	—N/a	3.5 GHz	3.9 GHz	—N/a		8 MB	—N/a	80 W	May 11, 2014	$262 / $273	LGA; 1150	DMI 2.0; PCIe 3.0	up to dual channel DDR3-1600 with ECC
Server	4 (8)	Xeon E3 v3	1240v3	—N/a	3.4 GHz	3.8 GHz	—N/a		8 MB	—N/a	80 W	June 2, 2013	$262 / $273	LGA; 1150	DMI 2.0; PCIe 3.0	up to dual channel DDR3-1600 with ECC
Server	4 (8)	Xeon E3 v3	1240Lv3	—N/a	2.0 GHz	3.0 GHz	—N/a		8 MB	—N/a	25 W	May 11, 2014	$278 / —	LGA; 1150	DMI 2.0; PCIe 3.0	up to dual channel DDR3-1600 with ECC
Server	4 (8)	Xeon E3 v3	1231v3	—N/a	3.4 GHz	3.8 GHz	—N/a		8 MB	—N/a	80 W	May 11, 2014	$240 / $250	LGA; 1150	DMI 2.0; PCIe 3.0	up to dual channel DDR3-1600 with ECC
Server	4 (8)	Xeon E3 v3	1230v3	—N/a	3.3 GHz	3.7 GHz	—N/a		8 MB	—N/a	80 W	June 2, 2013	$240 / $250	LGA; 1150	DMI 2.0; PCIe 3.0	up to dual channel DDR3-1600 with ECC
Server	4 (8)	Xeon E3 v3	1230Lv3	—N/a	1.8 GHz	2.8 GHz	—N/a		8 MB	—N/a	25 W	June 2, 2013	$250 / —	LGA; 1150	DMI 2.0; PCIe 3.0	up to dual channel DDR3-1600 with ECC
Server	4 (4)	Xeon E3 v3	1226v3	HD P4600 (GT2)	3.3 GHz	3.7 GHz	350 MHz	1.2 GHz	8 MB	—N/a	84 W	May 11, 2014	$213 / $224	LGA; 1150	DMI 2.0; PCIe 3.0	up to dual channel DDR3-1600 with ECC
Server	4 (4)	Xeon E3 v3	1225v3	HD P4600 (GT2)	3.2 GHz	3.6 GHz	350 MHz	1.2 GHz	8 MB	—N/a	84 W	June 2, 2013	$213 / $224	LGA; 1150	DMI 2.0; PCIe 3.0	up to dual channel DDR3-1600 with ECC
Server	4 (4)	Xeon E3 v3	1220v3	—N/a	3.1 GHz	3.5 GHz	—N/a		8 MB	—N/a	80 W	June 2, 2013	$193 / $203	LGA; 1150	DMI 2.0; PCIe 3.0	up to dual channel DDR3-1600 with ECC
Server	2 (4)	Xeon E3 v3	1220Lv3	—N/a	1.1 GHz	1.5 GHz	—N/a		4 MB	—N/a	13 W	September 1, 2013	$193 / —	LGA; 1150	DMI 2.0; PCIe 3.0	up to dual channel DDR3-1600 with ECC

SKU suffixes to denote:

- L – low power

=== Mobile processors ===
- All models support: MMX, SSE, SSE2, SSE3, SSSE3, SSE4.1, SSE4.2, F16C, Enhanced Intel SpeedStep Technology (EIST), Intel VT-x, Intel 64, XD bit (an NX bit implementation), and Smart Cache.
  - Core i3, i5 and i7 support AVX, AVX2, BMI1, BMI2, FMA3, and hyper-threading (HT).
  - Core i3, i5 and i7 except the Core i3-4000M support AES-NI.
  - Core i5 and i7 except the Core i5-4410E, i5-4402EC, i7-4700EC, and i7-4702EC support Turbo Boost 2.0.
- Haswell-ULT and ULX: Platform Controller Hub (PCH) integrated into the CPU package, slightly reducing the amount of space used on motherboards.
- Transistors: 1.3 billion
- Die size: 181 mm^{2}

The following table lists available mobile processors.

Target segment	Cores (threads)	Processor branding and model		GPU model	Programmable TDP				CPU Turbo (single core)	GPU clock rate		L3 cache	GPUeDRAM	Release date	Release price (USD)
Target segment	Cores (threads)	Processor branding and model		GPU model	SDP	cTDP down^{[a]}	Nominal TDP^{[b]}	cTDP up^{[c]}	CPU Turbo (single core)	Base	Turbo	L3 cache	GPUeDRAM	Release date	Release price (USD)
Performance	4 (8)	Core i7	4940MX	HD 4600 (GT2)	—N/a	—N/a	57 W / 3.1 GHz	65 W / 3.8 GHz	4.0 GHz	400 MHz	1.35 GHz	8 MB	—N/a	January 21, 2014	$1096
Performance	4 (8)	Core i7	4930MX	HD 4600 (GT2)	—N/a	—N/a	57 W / 3.0 GHz	65 W / 3.7 GHz	3.9 GHz	400 MHz	1.35 GHz	8 MB	—N/a	June 2, 2013	$1096
Performance	4 (8)	Core i7	4980HQ	Iris Pro 5200 (GT3e)	—N/a	—N/a	47 W / 2.8 GHz	—N/a	4.0 GHz	200 MHz	1.3 GHz	6 MB	128 MB	July 21, 2014	$623
Performance	4 (8)	Core i7	4960HQ	Iris Pro 5200 (GT3e)	—N/a	—N/a	47 W / 2.6 GHz	55 W / 3.6 GHz	3.8 GHz	200 MHz	1.3 GHz	6 MB	128 MB	September 1, 2013	$623
Performance	4 (8)	Core i7	4950HQ	Iris Pro 5200 (GT3e)	—N/a	—N/a	47 W / 2.4 GHz	55 W / 3.4 GHz	3.6 GHz	200 MHz	1.3 GHz	6 MB	128 MB	June 2, 2013	$623
Performance	4 (8)	Core i7	4910MQ	HD 4600 (GT2)	—N/a	—N/a	47 W / 2.9 GHz	55 W / 3.7 GHz	3.9 GHz	400 MHz	1.3 GHz	8 MB	—N/a	January 21, 2014	$568
Performance	4 (8)	Core i7	4900MQ	HD 4600 (GT2)	—N/a	—N/a	47 W / 2.8 GHz	55 W / 3.6 GHz	3.8 GHz	400 MHz	1.3 GHz	8 MB	—N/a	June 2, 2013	$570
Performance	4 (8)	Core i7	4870HQ	Iris Pro 5200 (GT3e)	—N/a	—N/a	47 W / 2.5 GHz	—N/a	3.7 GHz	200 MHz	1.2 GHz	6 MB	128 MB	July 21, 2014	$434
Performance	4 (8)	Core i7	4860EQ	Iris Pro 5200 (GT3e)	—N/a	—N/a	47 W / 1.8 GHz	—N/a	3.2 GHz	750 MHz	1 GHz	6 MB	128 MB	August 2013	$508
Performance	4 (8)	Core i7	4860HQ	Iris Pro 5200 (GT3e)	—N/a	—N/a	47 W / 2.4 GHz	55 W / 3.4 GHz	3.6 GHz	200 MHz	1.2 GHz	6 MB	128 MB	January 21, 2014	$434
Performance	4 (8)	Core i7	4850EQ	Iris Pro 5200 (GT3e)	—N/a	—N/a	47 W / 1.6 GHz	—N/a	3.2 GHz	650 MHz	1 GHz	6 MB	128 MB	August 2013	$466
Performance	4 (8)	Core i7	4850HQ	Iris Pro 5200 (GT3e)	—N/a	—N/a	47 W / 2.3 GHz	55 W / 3.3 GHz	3.5 GHz	200 MHz	1.2 GHz	6 MB	128 MB	June 2, 2013	$434
Performance	4 (8)	Core i7	4810MQ	HD 4600 (GT2)	—N/a	—N/a	47 W / 2.8 GHz	55 W / 3.6 GHz	3.8 GHz	400 MHz	1.3 GHz	6 MB	—N/a	January 21, 2014	$378
Performance	4 (8)	Core i7	4800MQ	HD 4600 (GT2)	—N/a	—N/a	47 W / 2.7 GHz	55 W / 3.5 GHz	3.7 GHz	400 MHz	1.3 GHz	6 MB	—N/a	June 2, 2013	$380
Performance	4 (8)	Core i7	4770HQ	Iris Pro 5200 (GT3e)	—N/a	—N/a	47 W / 2.2 GHz		3.4 GHz	200 MHz	1.2 GHz	6 MB	128 MB	July 21, 2014	$434
Performance	4 (8)	Core i7	4760HQ	Iris Pro 5200 (GT3e)	—N/a	—N/a	47 W / 2.1 GHz	55 W / 3.1 GHz	3.3 GHz	200 MHz	1.2 GHz	6 MB	128 MB	April 14, 2014	$434
Performance	4 (8)	Core i7	4750HQ	Iris Pro 5200 (GT3e)	—N/a	—N/a	47 W / 2.0 GHz	55 W / 3.0 GHz	3.2 GHz	200 MHz	1.2 GHz	6 MB	128 MB	June 2, 2013	$440
Performance	4 (8)	Core i7	4720HQ	HD 4600 (GT2)	—N/a	—N/a	47 W / 2.6 GHz	—N/a	3.6 GHz	400 MHz	1.2 GHz	6 MB	—N/a	January 2015	$378
Performance	4 (8)	Core i7	4712MQ	HD 4600 (GT2)	—N/a	—N/a	37 W / 2.3 GHz	45 W / 3.1 GHz	3.3 GHz	400 MHz	1.15 GHz	6 MB	—N/a	April 14, 2014	$378
Performance	4 (8)	Core i7	4712HQ	HD 4600 (GT2)	—N/a	—N/a	37 W / 2.3 GHz	45 W / 3.1 GHz	3.3 GHz	400 MHz	1.15 GHz	6 MB	—N/a	April 14, 2014	$378
Performance	4 (8)	Core i7	4710MQ	HD 4600 (GT2)	—N/a	—N/a	47 W / 2.5 GHz	55 W / 3.3 GHz	3.5 GHz	400 MHz	1.15 GHz	6 MB	—N/a	April 14, 2014	$378
Performance	4 (8)	Core i7	4710HQ	HD 4600 (GT2)	—N/a	—N/a	47 W / 2.5 GHz	55 W / 3.3 GHz	3.5 GHz	400 MHz	1.2 GHz	6 MB	—N/a	April 14, 2014	$378
Performance	4 (8)	Core i7	4702MQ	HD 4600 (GT2)	—N/a	—N/a	37 W / 2.2 GHz	45 W / 2.9 GHz	3.2 GHz	400 MHz	1.15 GHz	6 MB	—N/a	June 2, 2013	$383
Performance	4 (8)	Core i7	4702HQ	HD 4600 (GT2)	—N/a	—N/a	37 W / 2.2 GHz	45 W / 2.9 GHz	3.2 GHz	400 MHz	1.15 GHz	6 MB	—N/a	June 2, 2013	$383
Performance	4 (8)	Core i7	4700MQ	HD 4600 (GT2)	—N/a	—N/a	47 W / 2.4 GHz	55 W / 3.2 GHz	3.4 GHz	400 MHz	1.15 GHz	6 MB	—N/a	June 2, 2013	$383
Performance	4 (8)	Core i7	4700HQ	HD 4600 (GT2)	—N/a	—N/a	47 W / 2.4 GHz	55 W / 3.2 GHz	3.4 GHz	400 MHz	1.2 GHz	6 MB	—N/a	June 2, 2013	$383
Performance	4 (8)	Core i7	4701EQ	HD 4600 (GT2)	—N/a	—N/a	47 W / 2.4 GHz	55 W / 3.2 GHz	3.4 GHz	400 MHz	1 GHz	6 MB	—N/a	September 1, 2013	$415
Performance	4 (8)	Core i7	4700EQ	HD 4600 (GT2)	—N/a	—N/a	47 W / 2.4 GHz	55 W / 3.2 GHz	3.4 GHz	400 MHz	1 GHz	6 MB	—N/a	June 2, 2013	$378
Performance	4 (8)	Core i7	4702EC	—N/a	—N/a	—N/a	27 W / 2.0 GHz	—N/a	—N/a	—N/a	—N/a	8 MB	—N/a	April 2014	$459
Performance	4 (8)	Core i7	4700EC	—N/a	—N/a	43 W / 2.7 GHz	—N/a	—N/a	—N/a	—N/a	—N/a	8 MB	—N/a	April 2014	$459
Mainstream	2 (4)	Core i7	4650U	HD 5000 (GT3)	—N/a	11.5 W / 800 MHz	15 W / 1.7 GHz	—N/a	3.3 GHz	200 MHz	1.1 GHz	4 MB	—N/a	June 2, 2013	$454
Mainstream	2 (4)	Core i7	4610Y	HD 4200 (GT2)	6 W / 800 MHz	9.5 W / 800 MHz	11.5 W / 1.7 GHz	—N/a	2.9 GHz	200 MHz	850 MHz	4 MB	—N/a	September 1, 2013	$393
Mainstream	2 (4)	Core i7	4610M	HD 4600 (GT2)	—N/a	—N/a	37 W / 3.0 GHz	—N/a	3.7 GHz	400 MHz	1.3 GHz	4 MB	—N/a	January 21, 2014	$346
Mainstream	2 (4)	Core i7	4600M	HD 4600 (GT2)	—N/a	—N/a	37 W / 2.9 GHz	—N/a	3.6 GHz	400 MHz	1.3 GHz	4 MB	—N/a	September 1, 2013	$346
Mainstream	2 (4)	Core i7	4600U	HD 4400 (GT2)	—N/a	11.5 W / 800 MHz	15 W / 2.1 GHz	—N/a	3.3 GHz	200 MHz	1.1 GHz	4 MB	—N/a	September 1, 2013	$398
Mainstream	2 (4)	Core i7	4578U	Iris 5100 (GT3)	—N/a	23 W / 800 MHz	28 W / 3.0 GHz	—N/a	3.5 GHz	200 MHz	1.2 GHz	4 MB	—N/a	July 20, 2014	—N/a
Mainstream	2 (4)	Core i7	4558U	Iris 5100 (GT3)	—N/a	23 W / 800 MHz	28 W / 2.8 GHz	—N/a	3.3 GHz	200 MHz	1.2 GHz	4 MB	—N/a	June 2, 2013	$454
Mainstream	2 (4)	Core i7	4550U	HD 5000 (GT3)	—N/a	11.5 W / 800 MHz	15 W / 1.5 GHz	—N/a	3.0 GHz	200 MHz	1.1 GHz	4 MB	—N/a	June 2, 2013	$454
Mainstream	2 (4)	Core i7	4510U	HD 4400 (GT2)	—N/a	11.5 W / 800 MHz	15 W / 2.0 GHz	—N/a	3.1 GHz	200 MHz	1.1 GHz	4 MB	—N/a	April 2014	$393
Mainstream	2 (4)	Core i7	4500U	HD 4400 (GT2)	—N/a	11.5 W / 800 MHz	15 W / 1.8 GHz	25 W / 3.0 GHz	3.0 GHz	200 MHz	1.1 GHz	4 MB	—N/a	June 2, 2013	$398
Mainstream	2 (4)	Core i5	4402EC	—N/a	—N/a	—N/a	27 W / 2.5 GHz	—N/a	—N/a	—N/a	—N/a	4 MB	—N/a	April 2014	$324
Mainstream	2 (4)	Core i5	4422E	HD 4600 (GT2)	—N/a	—N/a	25 W / 1.8 GHz	—N/a	2.9 GHz	400 MHz	900 MHz	3 MB	—N/a	April 14, 2014	$266
Mainstream	2 (4)	Core i5	4410E	HD 4600 (GT2)	—N/a	—N/a	37 W / 2.9 GHz	—N/a	—N/a	400 MHz	1 GHz	3 MB	—N/a	April 14, 2014	$266
Mainstream	2 (4)	Core i5	4402E	HD 4600 (GT2)	—N/a	—N/a	25 W / 1.6 GHz	—N/a	2.7 GHz	400 MHz	900 MHz	3 MB	—N/a	September 1, 2013	$266
Mainstream	2 (4)	Core i5	4400E	HD 4600 (GT2)	—N/a	—N/a	37 W / 2.7 GHz	—N/a	3.3 GHz	400 MHz	1 GHz	3 MB	—N/a	September 1, 2013	$266
Mainstream	2 (4)	Core i5	4360U	HD 5000 (GT3)	—N/a	11.5 W / 800 MHz	15 W / 1.5 GHz	—N/a	3.0 GHz	200 MHz	1.1 GHz	3 MB	—N/a	January 21, 2014	$315
Mainstream	2 (4)	Core i5	4350U	HD 5000 (GT3)	—N/a	11.5 W / 800 MHz	15 W / 1.4 GHz	—N/a	2.9 GHz	200 MHz	1.1 GHz	3 MB	—N/a	June 2, 2013	$342
Mainstream	2 (4)	Core i5	4340M	HD 4600 (GT2)	—N/a	—N/a	37 W / 2.9 GHz	—N/a	3.6 GHz	400 MHz	1.25 GHz	3 MB	—N/a	January 21, 2014	$266
Mainstream	2 (4)	Core i5	4330M	HD 4600 (GT2)	—N/a	—N/a	37 W / 2.8 GHz	—N/a	3.5 GHz	400 MHz	1.25 GHz	3 MB	—N/a	September 1, 2013	$266
Mainstream	2 (4)	Core i5	4310M	HD 4600 (GT2)	—N/a	—N/a	37 W / 2.7 GHz	—N/a	3.4 GHz	400 MHz	1.25 GHz	3 MB	—N/a	January 21, 2014	$225
Mainstream	2 (4)	Core i5	4310U	HD 4400 (GT2)	—N/a	11.5 W / 800 MHz	15 W / 2.0 GHz	—N/a	3.0 GHz	200 MHz	1.1 GHz	3 MB	—N/a	January 21, 2014	$281
Mainstream	2 (4)	Core i5	4302Y	HD 4200 (GT2)	—N/a	4.5 W / 800 MHz	11.5 W / 1.6 GHz	—N/a	2.3 GHz	200 MHz	850 MHz	3 MB	—N/a	September 1, 2013	—N/a
Mainstream	2 (4)	Core i5	4300Y	HD 4200 (GT2)	6 W / 800 MHz	9.5 W / 800 MHz	11.5 W / 1.6 GHz	—N/a	2.3 GHz	200 MHz	850 MHz	3 MB	—N/a	September 1, 2013	$304
Mainstream	2 (4)	Core i5	4300M	HD 4600 (GT2)	—N/a	—N/a	37 W / 2.6 GHz	—N/a	3.3 GHz	400 MHz	1.25 GHz	3 MB	—N/a	September 1, 2013	$225
Mainstream	2 (4)	Core i5	4300U	HD 4400 (GT2)	—N/a	11.5 W / 800 MHz	15 W / 1.9 GHz	—N/a	2.9 GHz	200 MHz	1.1 GHz	3 MB	—N/a	September 1, 2013	$287
Mainstream	2 (4)	Core i5	4288U	Iris 5100 (GT3)	—N/a	23 W / 800 MHz	28 W / 2.6 GHz	—N/a	3.1 GHz	200 MHz	1.2 GHz	3 MB	—N/a	June 2, 2013	$342
Mainstream	2 (4)	Core i5	4258U	Iris 5100 (GT3)	—N/a	23 W / 800 MHz	28 W / 2.4 GHz	—N/a	2.9 GHz	200 MHz	1.1 GHz	3 MB	—N/a	June 2, 2013	$342
Mainstream	2 (4)	Core i5	4308U	Iris 5100 (GT3)	—N/a	23 W / 800 MHz	28 W / 2.8 GHz	—N/a	3.3 GHz	200 MHz	1.2 GHz	3 MB	—N/a	July 20, 2014	$315
Mainstream	2 (4)	Core i5	4260U	HD 5000 (GT3)	—N/a	11.5 W / 800 MHz	15 W / 1.4 GHz	—N/a	2.7 GHz	200 MHz	1 GHz	3 MB	—N/a	April 14, 2014	$315
Mainstream	2 (4)	Core i5	4250U	HD 5000 (GT3)	—N/a	11.5 W / 800 MHz	15 W / 1.3 GHz	—N/a	2.6 GHz	200 MHz	1 GHz	3 MB	—N/a	June 2, 2013	$342
Mainstream	2 (4)	Core i5	4210H	HD 4600 (GT2)	—N/a	—N/a	47 W / 2.9 GHz	—N/a	3.5 GHz	400 MHz	1.15 GHz	3 MB	—N/a	July 20, 2014	$225
Mainstream	2 (4)	Core i5	4210M	HD 4600 (GT2)	—N/a	—N/a	37 W / 2.6 GHz	—N/a	3.2 GHz	400 MHz	1.15 GHz	3 MB	—N/a	April 14, 2014	$225
Mainstream	2 (4)	Core i5	4210U	HD 4400 (GT2)	—N/a	11.5 W / 800 MHz	15 W / 1.7 GHz	—N/a	2.7 GHz	200 MHz	1 GHz	3 MB	—N/a	April 14, 2014	$287
Mainstream	2 (4)	Core i5	4220Y	HD 4200 (GT2)	6 W / 800 MHz	9.5 W / 800 MHz	11.5 W / 1.6 GHz	—N/a	2.0 GHz	200 MHz	850 MHz	3 MB	—N/a	April 14, 2014	$281
Mainstream	2 (4)	Core i5	4210Y	HD 4200 (GT2)	6 W / 800 MHz	9.5 W / 800 MHz	11.5 W / 1.5 GHz	—N/a	1.9 GHz	200 MHz	850 MHz	3 MB	—N/a	September 1, 2013	$304
Mainstream	2 (4)	Core i5	4202Y	HD 4200 (GT2)	4.5 W / 800 MHz	9.5 W / 800 MHz	11.5 W / 1.6 GHz	—N/a	2.0 GHz	200 MHz	850 MHz	3 MB	—N/a	September 1, 2013	—N/a
Mainstream	2 (4)	Core i5	4200Y	HD 4200 (GT2)	6 W / 800 MHz	9.5 W / 800 MHz	11.5 W / 1.4 GHz	—N/a	1.9 GHz	200 MHz	850 MHz	3 MB	—N/a	June 2, 2013	$304
Mainstream	2 (4)	Core i5	4200U	HD 4400 (GT2)	—N/a	11.5 W / 800 MHz	15 W / 1.6 GHz	25 W / ?	2.6 GHz	200 MHz	1 GHz	3 MB	—N/a	June 2, 2013	$287
Mainstream	2 (4)	Core i5	4200H	HD 4600 (GT2)	—N/a	—N/a	47 W / 2.8 GHz	—N/a	3.4 GHz	400 MHz	1.15 GHz	3 MB	—N/a	September 1, 2013	$257
Mainstream	2 (4)	Core i5	4200M	HD 4600 (GT2)	—N/a	—N/a	37 W / 2.5 GHz	—N/a	3.1 GHz	400 MHz	1.15 GHz	3 MB	—N/a	September 1, 2013	$240
Mainstream	2 (4)	Core i3	4158U	Iris 5100 (GT3)	—N/a	23 W / 800 MHz	28 W / 2.0 GHz	—N/a	—N/a	200 MHz	1.1 GHz	3 MB	—N/a	June 2, 2013	$342
Mainstream	2 (4)	Core i3	4120U	HD 4400 (GT2)	—N/a	11.5 W / 800 MHz	15 W / 2.0 GHz	—N/a	—N/a	200 MHz	1 GHz	3 MB	—N/a	April 14, 2014	$281
Mainstream	2 (4)	Core i3	4112E	HD 4600 (GT2)	—N/a	—N/a	25 W / 1.8 GHz	—N/a	—N/a	400 MHz	900 MHz	3 MB	—N/a	April 14, 2014	$225
Mainstream	2 (4)	Core i3	4110E	HD 4600 (GT2)	—N/a	—N/a	37 W / 2.6 GHz	—N/a	—N/a	400 MHz	900 MHz	3 MB	—N/a	April 14, 2014	$225
Mainstream	2 (4)	Core i3	4102E	HD 4600 (GT2)	—N/a	—N/a	25 W / 1.6 GHz	—N/a	—N/a	400 MHz	900 MHz	3 MB	—N/a	September 1, 2013	$225
Mainstream	2 (4)	Core i3	4100E	HD 4600 (GT2)	—N/a	—N/a	37 W / 2.4 GHz	—N/a	—N/a	400 MHz	900 MHz	3 MB	—N/a	September 1, 2013	$225
Mainstream	2 (4)	Core i3	4110M	HD 4600 (GT2)	—N/a	—N/a	37 W / 2.6 GHz	—N/a	—N/a	400 MHz	1.1 GHz	3 MB	—N/a	April 14, 2014	$225
Mainstream	2 (4)	Core i3	4100M	HD 4600 (GT2)	—N/a	—N/a	37 W / 2.5 GHz	—N/a	—N/a	400 MHz	1.1 GHz	3 MB	—N/a	September 1, 2013	$225
Mainstream	2 (4)	Core i3	4100U	HD 4400 (GT2)	—N/a	11.5 W / 800 MHz	15 W / 1.8 GHz	—N/a	—N/a	200 MHz	1 GHz	3 MB	—N/a	June 2, 2013	$287
Mainstream	2 (4)	Core i3	4030Y	HD 4200 (GT2)	6 W / 800 MHz	9.5 W / 800 MHz	11.5 W / 1.6 GHz	—N/a	—N/a	200 MHz	850 MHz	3 MB	—N/a	April 14, 2014	$281
Mainstream	2 (4)	Core i3	4020Y	HD 4200 (GT2)	6 W / 800 MHz	9.5 W / 800 MHz	11.5 W / 1.5 GHz	—N/a	—N/a	200 MHz	850 MHz	3 MB	—N/a	September 1, 2013	$304
Mainstream	2 (4)	Core i3	4012Y	HD 4200 (GT2)	4.5 W / 800 MHz	—N/a	11.5 W / 1.5 GHz	—N/a	—N/a	200 MHz	850 MHz	3 MB	—N/a	September 1, 2013	$304
Mainstream	2 (4)	Core i3	4010Y	HD 4200 (GT2)	6 W / 800 MHz	9.5 W / 800 MHz	11.5 W / 1.3 GHz	—N/a	—N/a	200 MHz	850 MHz	3 MB	—N/a	June 2, 2013	$304
Mainstream	2 (4)	Core i3	4030U	HD 4400 (GT2)	—N/a	11.5 W / 800 MHz	15 W / 1.9 GHz	—N/a	—N/a	200 MHz	1 GHz	3 MB	—N/a	April 14, 2014	$281
Mainstream	2 (4)	Core i3	4025U	HD 4400 (GT2)	—N/a	11.5 W / 800 MHz	15 W / 1.9 GHz	—N/a	—N/a	200 MHz	950 MHz	3 MB	—N/a	April 14, 2014	$275
Mainstream	2 (4)	Core i3	4010U	HD 4400 (GT2)	—N/a	11.5 W / 800 MHz	15 W / 1.7 GHz	—N/a	—N/a	200 MHz	1 GHz	3 MB	—N/a	September 1, 2013	$287
Mainstream	2 (4)	Core i3	4005U	HD 4400 (GT2)	—N/a	11.5 W / 800 MHz	15 W / 1.7 GHz	—N/a	—N/a	200 MHz	950 MHz	3 MB	—N/a	September 1, 2013	$281
Mainstream	2 (4)	Core i3	4000M	HD 4600 (GT2)	—N/a	—N/a	37 W / 2.4 GHz	—N/a	—N/a	400 MHz	1.1 GHz	3 MB	—N/a	September 1, 2013	$240
Budget	2 (2)	Pentium	3561Y	HD Graphics (GT1)	6 W / 800 MHz	—N/a	11.5 W / 1.2 GHz	—N/a	—N/a	200 MHz	850 MHz	2 MB	—N/a	December 2013	$161
Budget	2 (2)	Pentium	3560Y	HD Graphics (GT1)	6 W / 800 MHz	—N/a	11.5 W / 1.2 GHz	—N/a	—N/a	200 MHz	850 MHz	2 MB	—N/a	September 1, 2013	OEM
Budget	2 (2)	Pentium	3558U	HD Graphics (GT1)	—N/a	—N/a	15 W / 1.7 GHz	—N/a	—N/a	200 MHz	1 GHz	2 MB	—N/a	December 2013	$161
Budget	2 (2)	Pentium	3556U	HD Graphics (GT1)	—N/a	—N/a	15 W / 1.7 GHz	—N/a	—N/a	200 MHz	1 GHz	2 MB	—N/a	September 1, 2013	OEM
Budget	2 (2)	Pentium	3560M	HD Graphics (GT1)	—N/a	—N/a	37 W / 2.4 GHz	—N/a	—N/a	400 MHz	1.1 GHz	2 MB	—N/a	April 14, 2014	$134
Budget	2 (2)	Pentium	3550M	HD Graphics (GT1)	—N/a	—N/a	37 W / 2.3 GHz	—N/a	—N/a	400 MHz	1.1 GHz	2 MB	—N/a	September 1, 2013	$134
Budget	2 (2)	Celeron	2981U	HD Graphics (GT1)	—N/a	—N/a	15 W / 1.6 GHz	—N/a	—N/a	200 MHz	1 GHz	2 MB	—N/a	December 2013	$137
Budget	2 (2)	Celeron	2980U	HD Graphics (GT1)	—N/a	—N/a	15 W / 1.6 GHz	—N/a	—N/a	200 MHz	1 GHz	2 MB	—N/a	September 1, 2013	$137
Budget	2 (2)	Celeron	2957U	HD Graphics (GT1)	—N/a	—N/a	15 W / 1.4 GHz	—N/a	—N/a	200 MHz	1 GHz	2 MB	—N/a	December 2013	$132
Budget	2 (2)	Celeron	2955U	HD Graphics (GT1)	—N/a	—N/a	15 W / 1.4 GHz	—N/a	—N/a	200 MHz	1 GHz	2 MB	—N/a	September 1, 2013	$132
Budget	2 (2)	Celeron	2970M	HD Graphics (GT1)	—N/a	—N/a	37 W / 2.2 GHz	—N/a	—N/a	400 MHz	1.1 GHz	2 MB	—N/a	April 14, 2014	$75
Budget	2 (2)	Celeron	2950M	HD Graphics (GT1)	—N/a	—N/a	37 W / 2.0 GHz	—N/a	—N/a	400 MHz	1.1 GHz	2 MB	—N/a	September 1, 2013	$86
Budget	2 (2)	Celeron	2961Y	HD Graphics (GT1)	6 W / 800 MHz	—N/a	11.5 W / 1.1 GHz	—N/a	—N/a	200 MHz	850 MHz	2 MB	—N/a	December 2013	OEM

1. When a cooler or quieter mode of operation is desired, this mode specifies a lower TDP and lower guaranteed frequency versus the nominal mode.
2. This is the processor's rated frequency and TDP.
3. When extra cooling is available, this mode specifies a higher TDP and higher guaranteed frequency versus the nominal mode.

SKU suffixes to denote:

- M – dual-core mobile (Socket G3)
- MQ – quad-core mobile (Socket G3)
- U – ultra-low power (BGA1168 packaging)
- MX – quad-core extreme mobile (Socket G3)
- Y – extreme low-power (BGA1168 packaging)
- H – dual-core BGA1364 packaging
- HQ – quad-core BGA1364 packaging
- E – embedded version of H
- EQ – embedded version of HQ

== See also ==
- LGA 1150: Original Haswell chipsets
- List of Intel chipsets
- List of Intel CPU microarchitectures

== Notes ==
Atom (ULV)		Node name	Pentium/Core						
Microarch.	Step	Node name	Microarch.	Step					
		600 nm	P6	Pentium Pro (133 MHz)					
		500 nm	P6	Pentium Pro (150 MHz)					
		350 nm	P6	Pentium Pro (166–200 MHz)					
		350 nm	P6	Klamath					
		250 nm	P6	Deschutes					
		250 nm	P6	Katmai	NetBurst				
		180 nm	P6	Coppermine	Willamette				
		130 nm	P6	Tualatin	Northwood				
		130 nm	Pentium M (P6)	Banias	Northwood		NetBurst(HT)		NetBurst(×2)
		90 nm	Pentium M (P6)	Dothan	Prescott	⇨	Prescott‑2M	⇨	Smithfield
		90 nm	Pentium M (P6)	Dothan	~~Tejas~~	→	⇩	→	~~Cedarmill (Tejas)~~
		65 nm	Pentium M (P6)	Yonah	~~Nehalem (NetBurst)~~		Cedar Mill	⇨	Presler
		65 nm	Core	Merom	4 cores on mainstream desktop, DDR3 introduced				
Bonnell	Bonnell	45 nm	Core	Penryn					
Bonnell	Bonnell	45 nm	Nehalem	Nehalem	HT reintroduced, integrated MC, PCH; L3-cache introduced, 256 KB L2-cache/core				
Bonnell	Saltwell	32 nm	Nehalem	Westmere	Introduced GPU on same package and AES-NI				
Bonnell	Saltwell	32 nm	Sandy Bridge	Sandy Bridge	On-die ring bus, no more non-UEFI motherboards				
Silvermont	Silvermont	22 nm	Sandy Bridge	Ivy Bridge					
Silvermont	Silvermont	22 nm	Haswell	Haswell	Fully integrated voltage regulator				
Silvermont	Airmont	14 nm	Haswell	Broadwell					
Silvermont	Airmont	14 nm	Skylake	Skylake	DDR4 introduced on mainstream desktop				
Goldmont		14 nm	Skylake	Kaby Lake					
Goldmont		14 nm	Skylake	Coffee Lake	6 cores on mainstream desktop				
Goldmont		14 nm	Skylake	Amber Lake	Mobile-only				
Goldmont Plus		14 nm	Skylake	Whiskey Lake	Mobile-only				
Goldmont Plus		14 nm	Skylake	Coffee Lake Refresh	8 cores on mainstream desktop				
Goldmont Plus		14 nm	Skylake	Comet Lake	10 cores on mainstream desktop				
Goldmont Plus		14 nm	Sunny Cove	Cypress Cove (Rocket Lake)	Backported Sunny Cove microarchitecture for 14 nm				
Tremont		10 nm	Skylake	Palm Cove (Cannon Lake)	Mobile-only				
Tremont		10 nm	Sunny Cove	Sunny Cove (Ice Lake)	512 KB L2-cache/core				
Tremont		10 nm	Sunny Cove	Willow Cove (Tiger Lake)	X^{e} graphics engine				
Gracemont		Intel 7 (10 nm ESF)	Golden Cove	Golden Cove (Alder Lake)	Hybrid, DDR5, PCIe 5.0				
Gracemont		Intel 7 (10 nm ESF)	Golden Cove	Raptor Cove (Raptor Lake)					
Crestmont		Intel 4	Redwood Cove	Meteor Lake	Mobile-only; NPU, chiplet architecture				
Crestmont		Intel 3	Redwood Cove	Arrow Lake-U					
Skymont		TSMC N3B	Lion Cove	Lunar Lake	Low power mobile only (9–30 W)				
Skymont		TSMC N3B	Lion Cove	Arrow Lake					
Darkmont		Intel 18A	Cougar Cove	Panther Lake					
Arctic Wolf		Intel 18A and/or TSMC N2P	Coyote Cove	Nova Lake					
