= List of Intel Xeon chipsets =

Microprocessor chipsets

Around the time that the Pentium 4 processor was introduced, Intel's Xeon line diverged from its line of desktop processors, which at the time was using the Pentium branding.

The divergence was implemented by using different sockets; since then, the sockets for Xeon chips have tended to remain constant across several generations of implementation.

The chipsets contain a 'memory controller hub' and an 'I/O controller hub', which tend to be called 'north bridge' and 'south bridge' respectively. The memory controller hub connects to the processors, memory, high-speed I/O such as PCI Express, and to the I/O controller hub by a proprietary link. The I/O controller hub, on the other hand, connects to lower-speed I/O, such as SATA, PCI, USB, and Ethernet.

== P6-based Xeon chipsets ==
=== Dual-processor P6-based Xeon chipsets ===
Intel's initial preferred chipset for Pentium III Xeon was the 840.

| Product name | Codename | Processor FSB supported | Memory type supported | High-speed interfaces provided | Preferred IOCH |
|---|---|---|---|---|---|
| 440GX AGPset | Marlinespike | 100 | One 72-bit-wide channel of SDRAM, with ECC; up to four DIMMs | | PIIX4E |
| 840 | Carmel | 100 or 133 | Two channels RDRAM, two RIMMs per channel | | |

=== Four-processor P6-based Xeon chipsets ===
The Pentium III Xeon bus protocol allowed four processors on the same bus, so the 440GX AGPset could be used in four-CPU systems; the limit of 2 GB of main memory remained. These support Slot 2.

There was also the 450NX PCIset, which consisted of several chips: a single 82451NX Memory and IO Bridge Controller roughly analogous to the North Bridge, up to two 82454NX PCI Expander Bridges which converted the protocol used by 451NX to two 32-bit PCI33 or one 64-bit PCI33 bus, along with up to two memory cards each equipped with one 82452NX RAS/CAS Generator chip and two 82453NX Data Path Multiplexer chips. It supported PIIX3 and PIIX4E south bridges, and EDO DRAM.

=== Eight-processor P6-based Xeon chipset ===
In August 1999, Intel began shipping the Profusion PCIset. The chipset was based on technology developed by the Corollary company, which Intel acquired. It supported up to 8 Pentium III Xeon processors on two busses and maintained cache coherency between them. Profusion supported up to 32 GB of memory. It saw some limited competition from the NEC Aqua II chipset. Another minor player in the eight-way space was Axil Computer's NX801, which was used in an 8-way (two buses) Pentium Pro design, commercialized by Data General as their AV-8600 computer.

== NetBurst-based Xeon chipsets ==
=== Dual-processor NetBurst-based Xeon chipsets ===
E7500 corresponded to the first Northwood-based Pentium4 Xeons, E7501 is essentially identical but supports faster FSB and memory. The E7320, E7520 and E7525 chipsets correspond to Prescott-based Pentium4 Xeons, and differ mainly in their PCI Express support. These support Socket 604. The Intel 875P chipset was used in some two-socket motherboards for Xeons.

| Product name | Codename | Processor FSB supported | Memory type supported | High-speed interfaces provided | Preferred IOCH |
|---|---|---|---|---|---|
| 860 | Colusa | 400 MT/s | Two channels of ECC RDRAM at 800 or 600 MT/s, up to 3.2 GB/s | AGP 4× port and three hub interfaces for two 533 MB/s PCI buses and a 266 MB/s bus to ICH2 | ICH2 |
| E7205 | Granite Bay | 400 or 533 MT/s | Two channels of DDR at 100 MHz or 133 MHz | AGP 8× port, single 32-bit 33 MHz PCI bus, 266 MHz 8-bit hub interface for ICH4 | ICH4 |
| E7210 | Canterwood-ES | 400 MT/s, 533 MT/s or 800 MT/s | Two channels of unbuffered ECC and non-ECC DDR DIMMs (registered ECC is not supported) at 133 MHz, 166 MHz or 200 MHz (DDR-266/333/400) | 66 MHz CSA interface for Gigabit LAN. MCH is connected to ICH via 66 MHz 8-bit (266 MT/s) Hub Interface v1.5. A 6300ESB ICH provides up to four 32-bit and/or 64-bit PCI-X at 33 or 66 MHz. Intel E7210 is server variant of 875P (Socket 478) without AGP, it can be used in dual Socket 604 configurations. | 6300ESB |
| E7320 | Lindenhurst VS | 800 MT/s | Two channels of registered DDR-333 or DDR2-400 SDRAM | One ×8 PCI Express interface with max. theoretical bandwidth of 4 GB/s, which may be configured as two ×4 PCIe interfaces. (Note: The summary page of the E7320 datasheet incorrectly claims three PCI Express interfaces.) A 6700PXH provides PCI-X 32-bit and/or 64-bit interfaces at 33 MHz, 66 MHz, 100 MHz, and 133 MHz. | 6300ESB, or 82801ER (ICH5R) |
| E7500 | Plumas | 400 MT/s | Two channels of ECC DDR SDRAM at 100 MHz (3.2 GB/s peak) | Three ECC 1 GB/s (66 MHz ×8, 16-bit) 'Hub Interface' channels, which connect to 82870P2 chips to provide two 64-bit 66 MHz PCI or PCI-X buses each, plus one ECC 533 MB/s (66 MHz ×4) connector for ICH3-S | ICH3-S |
| E7501 | Plumas 533 | 533 MT/s | Two channels of ECC DDR SDRAM at 133 MHz (4.2 GB/s peak) | Three ECC 1 GB/s (66 MHz ×8, 16-bit) 'Hub Interface' channels, which connect to 82870P2 chips to provide two 64-bit 66 MHz PCI or PCI-X buses each, plus one ECC 533 MB/s (66 MHz ×4) connector for ICH3-S | ICH3-S |
| E7505 | Placer | 533 MT/s | Two channels of ECC DDR SDRAM at 133 MHz (4.2 GB/s peak) | AGP 8× port, three ECC 1 GB/s (66 MHz ×8, 16-bit) 'Hub Interface' channels, which connect to 82870P2 chips to provide two 64-bit 66 MHz PCI or PCI-X buses each, plus one ECC 533 MB/s (66 MHz ×4) connector for ICH4 | ICH4 |
| E7520 | Lindenhurst | 800 MT/s | Two channels of registered DDR-333 or DDR2-400 SDRAM | Three ×8 PCI Express interfaces each with max. theoretical bandwidth of 4 GB/s, which may be configured as two ×4 PCIe interfaces. A 6700PXH provides PCI-X 32-bit and/or 64-bit interfaces at 33 MHz, 66 MHz, 100 MHz, and 133 MHz. | 6300ESB, or 82801ER (ICH5R) |
| E7525 | Tumwater | 800 MT/s | Two channels of registered DDR-333 or DDR2-400 SDRAM | One ×16 and one ×8 PCI Express interface. A 6700PXH can be attached. | 6300ESB, or 82801ER (ICH5R) |

Note that the 82870P2 chips of E7500, E7501 and E7505 were initially designed for the Intel 870 chipset for Itanium 2, and that the summary page of the E7320 datasheet incorrectly claims three PCI Express interfaces.

=== Quad-processor NetBurst-based Xeon chipsets ===
As Intel didn't have a 4P-capable chipset for NetBurst-based Xeons until 2005, for three years ServerWorks GC-HE served as the de facto standard MP chipset, even being used in Intel's own motherboards (SPSH4 and SRSH4).

| Product name | Codename | Processor FSB supported | Memory type supported | High-speed interfaces provided | Preferred IOCH |
|---|---|---|---|---|---|
| E8500 | Twin Castle | 667 MT/s dual bus | DDR-266, DDR-333 or DDR2-400 | three ×8 and one ×4 PCI Express interface | 82801EB (ICH5), or 82801ER (ICH5R) |
| E8501 | Twin Castle | 667 and 800 MT/s dual bus | DDR-266, DDR-333 or DDR2-400 | three ×8 and one ×4 PCI Express interface | 82801EB (ICH5), or 82801ER (ICH5R) |

== Core-based Xeon chipsets ==
=== Single-processor Core-based Xeon chipsets ===
3000 and 3010 are an update on the E7230 chipset, codenamed Mukilteo, which has specifications very similar to the 3000 chipset. E7230 was preceded by E7221, which was Intel's first strictly single-socket server chipset.

| Product name | Codename | Processor FSB supported | Memory type supported | High-speed interfaces provided | Preferred IOCH |
|---|---|---|---|---|---|
| 3000 | Mukilteo-2 | 533 or 800 or 1066 MT/s | Two channels of ECC DDR2-533 or DDR2-667 | PCI Express ×8 port, single 32-bit 33 MHz PCI bus, DMI for ICH7 | ICH7 |
| 3010 | Mukilteo-2P | 533 or 800 or 1066 MT/s | Two channels of ECC DDR2-533 or DDR2-667 | PCI Express 1 ×16 or 2 ×8 ports, single 32-bit 33 MHz PCI bus, DMI for ICH7 | ICH7 |
| 3200 | Bigby-V | 800 or 1066 or 1333 MT/s | Two channels of ECC DDR2-667 or DDR2-800 | PCI Express ×8 port, single 32-bit 33 MHz PCI bus, DMI for ICH9 | ICH9 |
| 3210 | Bigby-P | 800 or 1066 or 1333 MT/s | Two channels of ECC DDR2-667 or DDR2-800 | PCI Express 1 ×16 or 2 ×8 ports, single 32-bit 33 MHz PCI bus, DMI for ICH9 | ICH9 |

=== Dual-processor Core-based Xeon chipsets ===
These chipsets use a 'dual independent bus' design, in which each socket has its own connection to the chipset. These use the LGA 771 socket. The datasheets omit the 667 MT/s FSB support, so 5400 may support it too.

| Product name | Codename | FSB speed (MT/s) | Snoop filter (Note: To keep cache coherency traffic between the two sockets from appearing on the second bus.) | Memory support | High-speed interfaces provided | Preferred IOCH |
|---|---|---|---|---|---|---|
| 5000P | Blackford | 667, 1066, 1333 | | Four channels of FB-DIMM at 533 or 667 MHz, up to 64 GB | Six PCIe ×4 ports, of which two are normally used for communication with IOCH, and a seventh ×4 port only for IOCH. | 631xESB or 632xESB |
| 5000Z | Blackford | 667, 1066, 1333 | | Two channels of FB-DIMM at 533 or 667 MHz, up to 16 GB | Four PCIe ×4 ports, of which two are normally used for communication with IOCH, and a fifth ×4 port only for IOCH. | 631xESB or 632xESB |
| 5000V | Blackford | 667, 1066, 1333 | | Two channels of FB-DIMM at 533 or 667 MHz, up to 16 GB | Two PCIe ×4 ports which are normally used for communication with IOCH, and a third ×4 port only for IOCH. | 631xESB or 632xESB |
| 5000X | Greencreek | 667, 1066, 1333 | A snoop filter comprising about 1 MB of SRAM for coverage of 16 MB of cache. | Four channels of FB-DIMM at 533 or 667 MHz, up to 64 GB | Six PCIe ×4 ports, of which two are normally used for communication with IOCH and the other four are combined into a ×16 port, and a seventh ×4 port only for IOCH. | 631xESB or 632xESB |
| 5100 | San Clemente | 667, 1066, 1333 | | Two channels of registered ECC DDR2 533 or 667 MT/s, up to 48 GB | 6 PCIe ×4 ports, plus one ×4 port reserved for IOCH | ICH9R |
| 5400 | Seaburg | 1066, 1333, 1600 | A more advanced snoop filter comprising about 1.6 MB of SRAM for coverage of 24 MB of cache. | Four channels of FB-DIMM at 533, 667 or 800 MHz, up to 128 GB | 9 PCIe ×4 ports, plus one ×4 port reserved for IOCH | 631xESB or 632xESB |

=== Four-processor Core-based Xeon chipsets ===
This chipset uses four independent buses, and is used by the Tigerton and Dunnington processors.

| Launch name | Codename | FSB speed | Snoop filter (Note: To keep cache coherency traffic between the two sockets from appearing on the other three buses.) | Memory support | Fast I/O | IOCH |
|---|---|---|---|---|---|---|
| 7300 | Clarksboro | 1066 MT/s | A very sophisticated snoop filter, comprising 4.5 MB of SRAM for coverage of 64 MB of cache. | Four channels of FB-DIMM at 533 or 667 MHz, up to 256 GB | 7 PCIe ×4 ports, of which two are usually used to connect to the IOCH, plus an 8th ×4 port only for IOCH | 631x or 632x |

== Nehalem-based Xeon chipsets ==
=== Single-processor Nehalem-based Xeon chipsets ===
The 3450 chipset is also compatible with an Intel Core i5 or Intel Core i3 processor.

| Product name | Codename | DMI | Fast I/O | Other features |
|---|---|---|---|---|
| 3400 | Ibex Peak | 1.0, 100 MT/s | PCI Express 6 ×1 ports, single 32-bit 33 MHz PCI bus, DMI for processor | 8× USB 2.0, 4× SATA, Integrated LAN |
| 3420 | Ibex Peak | 1.0, 100 MT/s | PCI Express 8 ×1 ports, single 32-bit 33 MHz PCI bus, DMI for processor | 12× USB 2.0, 6× SATA, Integrated LAN |
| 3450 | Ibex Peak | 1.0, 100 MT/s | PCI Express 8 ×1 ports, single 32-bit 33 MHz PCI bus, DMI for processor | 14× USB 2.0, 6× SATA, Integrated LAN |

=== Dual-processor Nehalem-based Xeon chipsets ===
The Nehalem-based Xeons for dual-socket systems, initially launched as the Xeon 55xx series, feature a very different system structure: the memory controllers are on the CPU, and the CPUs can communicate with one another as peers without going via the chipset. This means that the 5500 and 5520 (initial codename Tylersburg-EP) chipsets are essentially QPI to PCI Express interfaces; the 5520 is more intended for graphical workstations and the 5500 for servers that do not need vast amounts of PCI Express connectivity

| Launch name | Codename | QPI ports | QPI speed | Fast I/O | IOCH | Other features |
|---|---|---|---|---|---|---|
| 5500 | Tylersburg-24S, Tylersburg-24D | 1, 2 | 4.8, 5.86 or 6.4 GT/s | 1 ×16 PCIe Gen 2, 2 ×4 PCIe Gen 1 to talk to southbridge | ICH10 (ICH9 also possible) | Integrated Management Engine with its own 100 Mbit/s Ethernet |
| 5520 | Tylersburg-36S, Tylersburg-36D | 1, 2 | 4.8, 5.86 or 6.4 GT/s | 2 ×16 PCIe Gen 2, 1 ×4 PCIe Gen 1 to talk to southbridge | ICH10 (ICH9 also possible) | Integrated Management Engine with its own 100 Mbit/s Ethernet |

As well as the 5530

=== Four-processor Nehalem-based Xeon chipsets ===
| Launch name | Codename | QPI ports | QPI speed | Fast I/O | IOCH | Other features |
|---|---|---|---|---|---|---|
| 7500 | Boxboro | 2 | 6.4 GT/s | 2 ×16 PCIe Gen 2, 1 ×4 PCIe Gen 1 to talk to southbridge | ICH10 (ICH9 also possible) | Integrated Management Engine with its own 100 Mbit Ethernet |

== Sandy Bridge-based Xeon chipsets ==
=== Single-processor Sandy Bridge-based Xeon chipsets ===
The Intel C200 series chipsets that support the Intel Xeon E3-1200 CPU family.

| Product name | Codename | DMI | Fast I/O | Other features |
|---|---|---|---|---|
| C202 | Cougar Point | 2.0, 100 MT/s | PCI Express 8 × 1 ports, single 32-bit 33 MHz PCI bus, DMI for processor | 12 × USB 2.0, 6 × SATA 1.5/3 Gbit/s, Integrated LAN |
| C204 | Cougar Point | 2.0, 100 MT/s | PCI Express 8 × 1 ports, single 32-bit 33 MHz PCI bus, DMI for processor | 12 × USB 2.0, 2 × SATA 1.5/3/6 Gbit/s + 4 × SATA 1.5/3 Gbit/s, Integrated LAN |
| C206 | Cougar Point | 2.0, 100 MT/s | PCI Express 8 × 1 ports, single 32-bit 33 MHz PCI bus, DMI for processor | 14 × USB 2.0, 2 × SATA 1.5/3/6 Gbit/s + 4 × SATA 1.5/3 Gbit/s, Integrated LAN, Integrated Graphics, Intel Anti-Theft Technology, Active Management Technology 7.0 |

=== Dual-processor Sandy Bridge-based Xeon chipsets ===
The Intel C600 series chipsets support the Intel Xeon E5-2600 CPU family. Common to all C600 variants are the following features:

- DMI interface to CPU at 20 GT/s
- 8 PCIe 2.0 (5 GT/s) lanes, configurable by the board manufacturer as 8×1, 4×2, 2×4, or 1×8.
- 2 SATA ports supporting 6/3/1.5 gigabaud operation
- 4 SATA ports supporting 3/1.5 gigabaud operation
- one PCI 2.3 32-bit 33 MHz bus interface
- 14 USB 2.0 ports
- single-port Gigabit Ethernet controller
- Active Management Technology 7.0 and Anti-Theft Technology
- HD Audio controller

Some chipset variants have additional mass storage interfaces:

| Product name | Codename | additional mass storage capabilities |
|---|---|---|
| C602J | Patsburg | none |
| C602 | Patsburg | 4× SATA 1.5/3 gigabaud ports |
| C604 | Patsburg | 4× SAS/SATA 1.5/3 gigabaud ports |
| C606 | Patsburg | 8× SAS/SATA 1.5/3 gigabaud ports optionally through dedicated PCIe 2.0 ×4 (5 GT/s) interface, 1 additional SMBus |
| C608 | Patsburg | 8× SAS/SATA 1.5/3 gigabaud ports optionally through dedicated PCIe 2.0 ×4 (5 GT/s) interface, 2 additional SMBus |

=== Dual-processor Gladden/Sandy Bridge-EP/EN-based Xeon chipsets ===
The Intel Communications 8900 series chipsets that support the Gladden Intel Xeon E3-11xx or Sandy Bridge-EP/EN Intel Xeon E5-2xxx CPU families.

| Product name | Codename | DMI | Fast I/O | Other features |
|---|---|---|---|---|
| DH8900 | Cave Creek | 2.0, 100 MT/s | PCI Express 2.0 ×16 + PCI Express 1.0 4 × 1 ports, DMI for processor | 6 × USB 2.0, 6 × SATA 1.5/3 Gbit/s, 4 × Integrated LAN |
| DH8903 | Cave Creek | 2.0, 100 MT/s | PCI Express 2.0 ×8 + PCI Express 1.0 4 × 1 ports, DMI for processor | 6 × USB 2.0, 2 × SATA 1.5/3 Gbit/s, 4 × Integrated LAN, 5 Gbit/s QuickAssist |
| DH8910 | Cave Creek | 2.0, 100 MT/s | PCI Express 2.0 ×4 + PCI Express 1.0 4 × 1 ports, DMI for processor | 6 × USB 2.0, 2 × SATA 1.5/3 Gbit/s, 4 × Integrated LAN, 10 Gbit/s QuickAssist |
| DH8920 | Cave Creek | 2.0, 100 MT/s | PCI Express 2.0 ×4 + PCI Express 1.0 4 × 1 ports, DMI for processor | 6 × USB 2.0, 2 × SATA 1.5/3 Gbit/s, 4 × Integrated LAN, 20 Gbit/s QuickAssist |

== Ivy Bridge-based Xeon chipsets ==
=== Single-processor Ivy Bridge-based Xeon chipsets ===
The Intel C200 series chipsets that support the Intel Xeon E3-1200v2 CPU family.

| Product name | Codename | DMI | Fast I/O | Other features |
|---|---|---|---|---|
| C216 | Panther Point | 2.0, 100 MT/s | PCI Express 2.0 8 × 1 ports, single 32-bit 33 MHz PCI bus, DMI for processor | 4 × USB 3.0 + 14 × USB 2.0, 2 × SATA 1.5/3/6 Gbit/s + 4 × SATA 1.5/3 Gbit/s, Integrated LAN, Integrated Graphics, Intel Anti-Theft Technology, Active Management Technology 8.0 |

== Haswell-based Xeon chipsets ==
=== Single-processor Haswell-based Xeon chipsets ===
The Intel C220 series chipsets support the Intel Xeon E3-1200v3 and Intel Xeon E3-1200v4 CPU families.

| Product name | Codename | DMI | Fast I/O | Other features |
|---|---|---|---|---|
| C222 | Lynx Point | 2.3, 100 MT/s | Eight PCI Express 2.0 ×1 ports, DMI for processor | 10 × USB 2.0/3.0, 2 × SATA 1.5/3/6 Gbit/s + 4 × SATA 1.5/3 Gbit/s, Integrated LAN, Integrated IDE, Rapid Storage Technology enterprise |
| C224 | Lynx Point | 2.3, 100 MT/s | Eight PCI Express 2.0 ×1 ports, DMI for processor | 12 × USB 2.0/3.0, 4 × SATA 1.5/3/6 Gbit/s + 2 × SATA 1.5/3 Gbit/s, Integrated LAN, Integrated IDE, Rapid Storage Technology enterprise |
| C226 | Lynx Point | 2.3, 100 MT/s | Eight PCI Express 2.0 ×1 ports, DMI for processor | 8 × USB 2.0, 6 USB 3.0, 6 × SATA 1.5/3/6 Gbit/s, Integrated LAN, Integrated Graphics, Rapid Storage Technology enterprise, Active Management Technology 9.0, Identity Protection Technology, VGA, Wireless Display |

=== Multi processor Haswell/Broadwell-based Xeon chipsets ===
The Intel C610 series of chipsets supports the Intel Xeon E5-x600v3 and Intel Xeon E5-x600v4 CPU families.

| Product name | Codename | Lithography | DMI | Fast I/O | Other features | TDP |
|---|---|---|---|---|---|---|
| C612 | Wellsburg | 32nm | 5 GT/s | 8 PCI Express 2.0 lanes configurable as ×1, x2, x4 | 14 × USB 2.0/3.0, 10 × SATA 6 Gbit/s, Integrated 1 Gbps LAN, Rapid Storage Technology enterprise (RSTe 4.0) | 7W |

== Skylake-based Xeon chipsets ==
=== Single-processor Skylake-based Xeon chipsets ===
The Intel C230 series chipsets support the Intel Xeon E3-1200v5 CPU family.

Both, the C232 and the C236 support the LGA 1151 socket.

| Product name | Codename | DMI | Fast I/O | Other features |
|---|---|---|---|---|
| C232 | Sunrise Point | 3.0, 100 MT/s | Max. 8 lanes PCIe 3.0 at ×4, ×2, ×1 configuration, DMI for processor | 6× USB 3.0, 6× USB 2.0, 6× SATA 6 Gbit/s, M.2 & SATA Express support, integrated LAN, Rapid Storage Technology enterprise |
| C236 | Sunrise Point | 3.0, 100 MT/s | Max. 20 lanes PCIe 3.0 at ×4, ×2, ×1 configuration, DMI for processor | 10× USB 3.0, 4× USB 2.0, 8× SATA 6 Gbit/s, M.2 & SATA Express support, integrated LAN, Rapid Storage Technology enterprise, 3× displays |

== Coffee Lake-based Xeon chipsets ==
The Intel C246 series chipsets support the Intel Xeon E-2100 series of CPUs.

| Product name | Codename | DMI | Fast I/O | Other features |
|---|---|---|---|---|
| C242 | ? | 3.0 ×4 | Max. 10 lanes PCIe 3.0 | 6× USB 3.1 (up to 2× USB 3.1 Gen 2, up to 6× USB 3.1 Gen 1), 6× USB 2.0, SATA, Ethernet, Wifi |
| C246 | ? | 3.0 ×4 | Max. 24 lanes PCIe 3.0 | 10× USB 3.1 (up to 6× USB 3.1 Gen 2, up to 10× USB 3.1 Gen 1), 4× USB 2.0, SATA, Ethernet, Wifi |

== See also ==
- List of Intel chipsets
- List of Intel microprocessors
- List of Intel Xeon microprocessors
