= List of Intel Pentium 4 processors =

The Pentium 4 was a seventh-generation CPU from Intel targeted at the consumer and enterprise markets. It is based on the NetBurst microarchitecture.

== Desktop processors ==
=== Pentium 4 ===
==== Willamette (180 nm) ====
- Intel Family 15 Model 1
- All models support: MMX, SSE, SSE2
- Transistors: 42 million
- Die size: 217 mm^{2}
- Steppings: B2, C1, D0, E0

Model number	sSpec number	Frequency	L2 cache	FSB speed	Clock multiplier	Voltage range	TDP	Socket	Release date	Part number(s)	Release price (USD)
Pentium 4 1.3	SL4SF (B2); SL4QD (B2); SL5GC (C1); SL5FW (C1)	1.3 GHz	256 KB	400 MT/s	13×	1.605-1.75 V	48.9 W 51.6 W	Socket 423	January 3, 2001	80528PC013G0K; YD80528PC013G0K	$409
Pentium 4 1.4	SL4SG (B2); SL4SC (B2); SL4X2 (C1); SL4WS (C1)	1.4 GHz	256 KB	400 MT/s	14×	1.600-1.75 V	51.8 W 54.7 W	Socket 423	November 20, 2000	80528PC017G0K; YD80528PC017G0K	$644
Pentium 4 1.5	SL4SH (B2); SL4TY (B2); SL4WT (C1); SL4X3 (C1); SL5SX (D0); SL5TN (D0)	1.5 GHz	256 KB	400 MT/s	15×	1.605-1.75 V	54.7 W 57.8 W	Socket 423	November 20, 2000	80528PC021G0K; YD80528PC021G0K; RN80528PC021G0K	$819
Pentium 4 1.6	SL4WU (C1); SL4X4 (C1); SL5UL (D0); SL5VL (D0)	1.6 GHz	256 KB	400 MT/s	16×	1.590-1.75 V	61 W	Socket 423	July 2, 2001	YD80528PC025G0K; RN80528PC025G0K	$294
Pentium 4 1.7	SL57V (C1); SL57W (C1); SL5SY (D0); SL5TP (D0)	1.7 GHz	256 KB	400 MT/s	17×	1.580-1.75 V	64 W	Socket 423	April 23, 2001	YD80528PC029G0K; RN80528PC029G0K	$352
Pentium 4 1.8	SL4WV (C1); SL4X5 (C1); SL5UM (D0); SL5VM (D0)	1.8 GHz	256 KB	400 MT/s	18×	1.575-1.75 V	66.7 W	Socket 423	July 2, 2001	YD80528PC033G0K; RN80528PC033G0K	$562
Pentium 4 1.9	SL5VN (D0); SL5WH (D0)	1.9 GHz	256 KB	400 MT/s	19×	1.570-1.75V	69.2 W	Socket 423	August 27, 2001	RN80528PC037G0K	$375
Pentium 4 2.0	SL5SZ (D0); SL5TQ (D0)	2.0 GHz	256 KB	400 MT/s	20×	1.560-1.75 V	71.8 W	Socket 423	August 27, 2001	RN80528PC041G0K	$562
Pentium 4 1.4	SL5N7 (C1); SL59U (C1); SL5TG (D0); SL5UE (D0)	1.4 GHz	256 KB	400 MT/s	14×	1.600-1.75 V	55.3 W	Socket 478	August 27, 2001	RK80531PC017G0K	$133
Pentium 4 1.5	SL59V (C1); SL5N8 (C1); SL5TJ (D0); SL5UF (D0); SL62Y (D0); SL6BA (E0)	1.5 GHz	256 KB	400 MT/s	15×	1.605-1.75 V	57.9 W 62.9 W	Socket 478	August 27, 2001	RK80531PC021G0K; RK80531PC021256	$133
Pentium 4 1.6	SL5US (B2); SL5UW (C1); SL5UJ (D0); SL5VH (D0); SL6BC (E0); SL679 (E0)	1.6 GHz	256 KB	400 MT/s	16×	1.590-1.75 V	60.8 W	Socket 478	August 27, 2001	RK80531PC025G0K; RK80531PC025256	$163
Pentium 4 1.7	SL5N9 (C1); SL59X (C1); SL5TK (D0); SL5UG (D0); SL62Z (D0); SL6BD (E0); SL67A (E0)	1.7 GHz	256 KB	400 MT/s	17×	1.580-1.75 V	63.5 W 67.7 W	Socket 478	August 27, 2001	RK80531PC029G0K; RK80531PC029256	$193
Pentium 4 1.8	SL5UT (C1); SL5UV (C1); SL5UK (D0); SL5VJ (D0); SL6BE (E0); SL67B (E0)	1.8 GHz	256 KB	400 MT/s	18×	1.575-1.75 V	66.1 W	Socket 478	August 27, 2001	RK80531PC033G0K; RK80531PC033256	$256
Pentium 4 1.9	SL5VK (D0); SL5WG (D0); SL6BF (D0); SL67C (E0)	1.9 GHz	256 KB	400 MT/s	19×	1.570-1.75 V	72.8 W	Socket 478	August 27, 2001	RK80531PC037G0K; RK80531PC037256	$375
Pentium 4 2.0	SL5TL (D0); SL5UH (D0)	2.0 GHz	256 KB	400 MT/s	20×	1.560-1.75 V	75.3 W	Socket 478	August 27, 2001	RK80531PC041G0K	$562

==== Northwood (130 nm) ====
- Intel Family 15 Model 2
- All models support: MMX, SSE, SSE2
- Model SL68R has box version only, supplied with unattached fan heatsink.
- Transistors: 55 million
- Die size: 146 mm^{2} (B0 pre-shrink) and 131 mm^{2} (B0 Shrink, C1, D1) (Note: Actually the shrink was to 132 mm^{2} (11.34 × 11.62 ≈ 131.77))
- Steppings: B0, C1, D1, M0

Model number	sSpec number	Frequency	L2 cache	FSB speed	Multiplier	Voltage range	TDP	Socket	Release date	Part number(s)	Release price (USD)
Pentium 4 1.6A	SL668 (B0)	1.6 GHz	512 KB	400 MT/s	16×	1.475 V	46.8 W	Socket 478	January 7, 2002	BX80532PC1600D	
Pentium 4 1.8A	SL63X (B0); SL62P (B0); SL68Q (B0); SL66Q (B0 Shrink)	1.8 GHz	512 KB	400 MT/s	18×	1.475-1.525 V	68.1 W	Socket 478	January 7, 2002	RK80532PC033512; BX80532PC1800D	
Pentium 4 1.8A	SL6LA (C1) SL6S6 (C1); SL6SN (C1); SL6QL (D1)	1.8 GHz	512 KB	400 MT/s	18×	1.475-1.525 V	66.1 W	Socket 478	January 7, 2002	RK80532PC033512; BX80532PC1800D	
Pentium 4 2.0A	SL5YR (B0); SL5ZT (B0); SL66R (B0 Shrink); SL68R (B0 Shrink)	2.0 GHz	512 KB	400 MT/s	20×	1.36-1.435 V	52.4 W	Socket 478	January 7, 2002	RK80532PC041512; BX80532PC2000D	$364
Pentium 4 2.0A	SL6GQ (C1); SL6S7 (C1); SL6SP (C1)	2.0 GHz	512 KB	400 MT/s	20×	1.36-1.435 V	54.3 W	Socket 478	January 7, 2002	RK80532PC041512; BX80532PC2000D	$364
Pentium 4 2.2	SL5YS (B0); SL66S (B0 Shrink)	2.2 GHz	512 KB	400 MT/s	22×	1.36-1.435 V	55.1 W	Socket 478	January 7, 2002	RK80532PC049512; BX80532PC2200D	$562
Pentium 4 2.4	SL65R (B0); SL66T (B0); SL6GS (C1); SL6S9 (C1); SL6PM (D1)	2.4 GHz	512 KB	400 MT/s	24×	1.35-1.43 V	57.8 W 59.8 W 59.8 W	Socket 478	April 2, 2002	BX80532PC2400D; RK80532PC056512	$562
Pentium 4 2.5	SL6PN (D1)	2.5 GHz	512 KB	400 MT/s	25×	1.35-1.43 V	61 W	Socket 478	August 26, 2002	RK80532PC060512	$243
Pentium 4 2.6	SL6SB (C1); SL6PP (D1)	2.6 GHz	512 KB	400 MT/s	26×	1.345-1.525 V	62.6 W	Socket 478	August 26, 2002	BX80532PC2600D; RK80532PC064512	$401
Pentium 4 2.8	SL7EY (D1)	2.8 GHz	512 KB	400 MT/s	28×	1.475-1.55 V	68.4 W	Socket 478	November 2002	RK80532PC072512	
Pentium 4 3.0	SL6YH (C1); SL74Q (D1)	3.0 GHz	512 KB	400 MT/s	30×	1.55 V	~80 W	Socket 478		RK80532PC080512; RK80532NC080512	
Pentium 4 2.26	SL67Y (B0); SL6D6 (B0 Shrink)	2.26 GHz	512 KB	533 MT/s	17×	1.355-1.435V	56 W	Socket 478	May 6, 2002	RK80532PE051512	$423
Pentium 4 2.26	SL6RY (C1); SL6PB (D1); SL7V9 (M0)	2.26 GHz	512 KB	533 MT/s	17×	1.355-1.435V	58 W	Socket 478	May 6, 2002	RK80532PE051512	$423
Pentium 4 2.4B	SL67Z (B0); SL6D7 (B0 Shrink); SL6EU (B0 Shrink); SL6DV (C1); SL6EF (C1); SL6SH (C1); SL6RZ (C1); SL6PC (D1); SL6Q8 (D1); SL79B (M0)	2.40 GHz	512 KB	533 MT/s	18×	1.3-1.525 V	59.8 W	Socket 478	May 6, 2002	BX80532PE2400D; RK80532PE056512	$562
Pentium 4 2.53	SL682 (B0); SL6D8 (B0); SL6EV (B0 Shrink)	2.53 GHz	512 KB	533 MT/s	19×	1.345-1.43 V	61.5 W	Socket 478	May 6, 2002	RK80532PE061512; BX80532PE2533D	$637
Pentium 4 2.53	SL6EG (C1); SL6DW (C1); SL6S2 (C1)	2.53 GHz	512 KB	533 MT/s	19×	1.525 V		Socket 478	May 6, 2002	RK80532PE061512; BX80532PE2533D	$637
Pentium 4 2.66	SL6PE (D1); SL6DX (C1); SL6QA (D1); SL6S3 (C1)	2.66 GHz	512 KB	533 MT/s	20×	1.345-1.42 V	66.1 W	Socket 478	August 26, 2002	RK80532PE067512	$401
Pentium 4 2.8	SL6HL (C1); SL6K6 (C1); SL6PF (D1); SL6QB (D1); SL6S4 (C1)	2.80 GHz	512 KB	533 MT/s	21×	1.34-1.525 V	68.4 W	Socket 478	August 26, 2002	BX80532PE2800D; RK80532PE072512	$508
Small form factor
Pentium 4 SFF 1.6	SL62S (B0); SL6E3 (B0 Shrink)	1.60 GHz	512 KB	400 MT/s	16x	1.475 V	38 W	Socket 478	January 7, 2002	RK80534PC025512	

==== Prescott (90 nm) ====
- Intel Family 15 Model 3 (C0, D0), Intel Family 15 Model 4 (E0, G1)
- All models support: MMX, SSE, SSE2, SSE3
- Intel 64: supported by 5x6, 511 and 519K
- XD bit (an NX bit implementation): supported by all Intel 64-compatible models as well as 5x5J and 519J
- Transistors: 125 million
- Die size: 112 mm^{2}
- Steppings: C0, D0, E0, G1

Model number	sSpec number	Frequency	L2 cache	FSB speed	Multiplier	Voltage range	TDP	Socket	Release date	Part number(s)
Pentium 4 2.40A	SL7FY (C0); SL7E8 (C1); SL7YP (D1); SL88F (E0)	2.40 GHz	1024 KB	533 MT/s	18×	1.287-1.4 V	89 W	Socket 478	March 2004	B80546PE0561M; RK80546PG0561M
Pentium 4 2.66A	SL7E9 (C0); SL8B3 (E0)	2.66 GHz	1024 KB	533 MT/s	20×	1.25-1.388 V	89 W	Socket 478		RK80546PE0671M; BX80546PE2667E
Pentium 4 2.80A	SL7D8 (C1); SL7J4 (D0); SL7K9 (D0); SL7KA (D0); SL7E2 (D1); SL7KH (D2); SL7PK (E0); SL88G (E0); SL8JX (G1)	2.80 GHz	1024 KB	533 MT/s	21×	1.25-1.4 V	89 W	Socket 478	February 1, 2004	RK80546PE0721M; NE80546PE0721M
Pentium 4 505	SL7YU (D0)	2.66 GHz	1024 KB	533 MT/s	20×	1.25-1.4 V	84 W	LGA 775	December 2004	JM80547PE0671M
Pentium 4 505J	SL85U (E0)	2.66 GHz	1024 KB	533 MT/s	20×	1.25-1.4 V	84 W	LGA 775	December 2004	JM80547PE0671M
Pentium 4 506	SL8J8 (E0); SL8PL (G1); SL9CK (G1)	2.66 GHz	1024 KB	533 MT/s	20×	1.25-1.4 V	84 W	LGA 775	June 2005	JM80547PE0671MN
Pentium 4 511	SL8U5 (E0); SL9CJ (G1); SL8U4 (G1)	2.80 GHz	1024 KB	533 MT/s	21×	1.25-1.4 V	84 W	LGA 775	2005	HH80547PE0721MN; JM80547PE0721MN
Pentium 4 515	SL7YV (D0)	2.93 GHz	1024 KB	533 MT/s	22×	1.25-1.4 V	84 W	LGA 775	December 2004	JM80547PE0771M
Pentium 4 515J	SL85V (E0)	2.93 GHz	1024 KB	533 MT/s	22×	1.25-1.4 V	84 W	LGA 775	December 2004	JM80547PE0771M
Pentium 4 516	SL8J9 (E0); SL8PM (G1)	2.93 GHz	1024 KB	533 MT/s	22×	1.25-1.4 V	84 W	LGA 775	September 2005	JM80547PE0771MN
Pentium 4 519J	SL87L (E0)	3.06 GHz	1024 KB	533 MT/s	23×	1.25-1.388 V	84 W	LGA 775	December 2004	JM80547PE0831M
Pentium 4 519K	SL8JA (E0); SL8PN (G1)	3.06 GHz	1024 KB	533 MT/s	23×	1.25-1.4 V	84 W	LGA 775	2005	JM80547PE0831MN; HH80547PE0831MN

=== Pentium 4 HT ===
==== Northwood (130 nm) ====
- All models support: MMX, SSE, SSE2, Hyper-threading
- Transistors: 55 million
- Die size: 131 mm^{2}
- C1, D1, M0

Model number	sSpec number	Frequency	L2 cache	FSB speed	Multiplier	Voltage range	TDP	Socket	Release date	Part number(s)	Release price (USD)
Pentium 4 HT 2.4C	SL6WR (D1); SL6WF (D1); SL6Z3 (M0)	2.4 GHz	512 KB	800 MT/s	12×	1.475–1.525 V	66.2 W	Socket 478	May 21, 2003	RK80532PG056512	$178
Pentium 4 HT 2.6C	SL6WH (D1); SL6WS (D1); SL6Z4 (M0)	2.6 GHz	512 KB	800 MT/s	13×	1.475–1.525 V	69 W	Socket 478	May 21, 2003	RK80532PG064512	$218
Pentium 4 HT 2.8C	SL6WJ (D1); SL6WT (D1); SL78Y (D1); SL6Z5 (M0)	2.8 GHz	512 KB	800 MT/s	14×	1.475–1.525 V	69.7 W	Socket 478	May 21, 2003	RK80532PG072512; RK80532RC052128	$278
Pentium 4 HT 3.0	SL6WU (D1); SL6WK (D1); SL78Z (M0)	3.0 GHz	512 KB	800 MT/s	15×	1.475–1.55 V	81.9 W	Socket 478	April 14, 2003	RK80532PG080512	$417
Pentium 4 HT 3.06	SL6K7 (C1); SL6JJ (C1); SL6S5 (C1); SL6SM (C1); SL6PG (D1); SL6QC (D1)	3.06 GHz	512 KB	533 MT/s	23×	1.525–1.55 V	81.8 W	Socket 478	November 14, 2002	BX80532PE3066D; RK80532PE083512	$637
Pentium 4 HT 3.2	SL792 (D1); SL6WG (D1); SL6WE (D1)	3.2 GHz	512 KB	800 MT/s	16×	1.25–1.40 V	82 W	Socket 478	June 23, 2003	RK80532PG088512; BX80532PG3200D	$637
Pentium 4 HT 3.4	SL793 (D1)	3.4 GHz	512 KB	800 MT/s	17×	1.25–1.40 V	89 W	Socket 478	February 2, 2004	RK80532PG096512	$417

==== Prescott (90 nm) ====
- All models support: MMX, SSE, SSE2, SSE3, Hyper-threading
- Intel 64: supported by 5x1, 517 and 524, as well as F-series and few OEM models in E-series (SL7QB, SL7Q8)
- XD bit (an NX bit implementation): supported by select Intel 64-compatible versions as well as 5x0J
- Intel Family 15 Model 3
- Model SL7E4 has an unattached fan heatsink.
- Some Socket 478 models supports loadline B (FMB1.0) with reduced TDP to 89 Watts (100.39 Watts peak)
- Some LGA775 models supports Prescott FMB1 (775_VR_CONFIG_04A) with reduced TDP to 85 Watts (100.78 Watts peak)
- Transistors: 125 million
- Die size: 112 mm^{2}
- Steppings: C0, D0, E0, G1

Model number	sSpec number	Frequency	L2 cache	FSB speed	Multiplier	Voltage range	TDP	Socket	Release date	Part number(s)	Release price (USD)
Pentium 4 HT 2.8E	SL79K (C0); SL7KA (C0); SL7E3 (D0); SL7PL (E0); SL88H (E0)	2.80 GHz	1024 KB	800 MT/s	14×	1.287-1.4 V	89 W	Socket 478	February 2, 2004	RK80546PG0721M; BX80546PG2800E	$178
Pentium 4 HT 3.0E	SL8JZ (G1); SL7L4 (D0); SL7E4 (D0); SL88J (E0); SL79L (C0); SL7KB (D0); SL7PM (E0)	3.00 GHz	1024 KB	800 MT/s	15×	1.2-1.425 V	89 W	Socket 478	February 2, 2004	NE80546PG0801M; RK80546PG0801M	$218
Pentium 4 HT 3.2E	SL79M (C0); SL7B8 (C0); SL7E5 (D0); SL7L7 (D0); SL7PN (E0); SL7QB (E0); SL7KC (C0); SL88K (E0); SL8K2 (G1)	3.20 GHz	1024 KB	800 MT/s	16×	1.25-1.4 V	103 W	Socket 478	February 2, 2004	BX80546PG3200E; RK80546PG0881M	$278
Pentium 4 HT 3.2F	SL7LA (D0)	3.20 GHz	1024 KB	800 MT/s	16×	1.2-1.425 V	103 W	LGA 775	August 2004	JM80547PG0881M	$278
Pentium 4 HT 3.4E	SL7B9 (C0); SL7AJ (C0); SL7E6 (D0); SL7Q8 (E0); SL7KD (E0); SL7PP (E0); SL88L (E0)	3.40 GHz	1024 KB	800 MT/s	17×	1.2-1.425 V	103 W	Socket 478	February 2, 2004	RK80546PG0961M NE80546PG0961M; BX80546PG3400E	$417
Pentium 4 HT 3.4F	SL7L8 (D0)	3.40 GHz	1024 KB	800 MT/s	17×	1.2-1.425 V	115 W	LGA 775	August 1, 2004	JM80547PG0961M	$417
Pentium 4 HT 3.6F	SL7L9 (D0)	3.60 GHz	1024 KB	800 MT/s	18×	1.2-1.425 V	115 W	LGA 775	August 4, 2004	JM80547PG1041M	$637
Pentium 4 HT 3.8F	SL7P2 (E0)	3.80 GHz	1024 KB	800 MT/s	19×	1.2-1.425 V	115 W	LGA 775	November 2004	JM80547PG1121M	$637
Pentium 4 HT 517	SL8ZY (G1); SL9CD (G1)	2.93 GHz	1024 KB	533 MT/s	22×	1.25-1.4 V	84 W	LGA 775	September 2005	HH80547PE0771MM	
Pentium 4 HT 520	SL7J5 (D0); SL7KJ (D0)	2.80 GHz	1024 KB	800 MT/s	14×	1.2-1.425 V	84 W	LGA 775	June 21, 2004	JM80547PG0721M	$178
Pentium 4 HT 520J	SL7PR (E0); SL7PT (E0); SL82V (E0)	2.80 GHz	1024 KB	800 MT/s	14×	1.25-1.4 V	84 W	LGA 775	October 2004	JM80547PG0721M	$178
Pentium 4 HT 521	SL8HX (E0); SL8PP (G1); SL9CG (G1)	2.80 GHz	1024 KB	800 MT/s	14×	1.2-1.425 V	84 W	LGA 775	June 12, 2005	JM80547PG0721MM; HH80547PG0721MM	$163
Pentium 4 HT 524	SL8ZZ (G1); SL9CA (G1)	3.06 GHz	1024 KB	533 MT/s	23×	1.2-1.425 V	84 W	LGA 775	September 2005	HH80547PE0831MM	
Pentium 4 HT 530	SL7J6 (D0); SL7KK (D0); SL82X (D0); SL8BM (D0)	3.00 GHz	1024 KB	800 MT/s	15×	1.2-1.425 V	84 W	LGA 775	June 21, 2004	JM80547PG0801M	$218
Pentium 4 HT 530J	SL7PU (E0); SL82Y (E0)	3.00 GHz	1024 KB	800 MT/s	15×	1.2-1.425 V	84 W	LGA 775	October 2004	JM80547PG0801M	$218
Pentium 4 HT 531	SL8HZ (E0); SL8PQ (G1); SL9CB (G1)	3.00 GHz	1024 KB	800 MT/s	15×	1.2-1.425 V	84 W	LGA 775	June 12, 2005	JM80547PG0801M; HH80547PG0801M	$178
Pentium 4 HT 540	SL7J7 (D0); SL7KL (D0)	3.20 GHz	1024 KB	800 MT/s	16×	1.2-1.425 V	84 W	LGA 775	June 21, 2004	JM80547PG0881M	$278
Pentium 4 HT 540J	SL7PW (E0); SL82Z (E0)	3.20 GHz	1024 KB	800 MT/s	16×	1.25-1.425 V	84 W	LGA 775	October 2004	JM80547PG0881M	$278
Pentium 4 HT 541	SL9C6 (G1); SL8PR (G1); SL8J2 (E0) SL7PX (E0)	3.20 GHz	1024 KB	800 MT/s	16×	1.2-1.425 V	84 W	LGA 775	June 12, 2005	JM80547PG0881MM; HH80547PG0881MM	$218
Pentium 4 HT 550	SL7J8 (D0); SL7KM (D0)	3.40 GHz	1024 KB	800 MT/s	17×	1.2-1.425 V	115 W	LGA 775	June 21, 2004	JM80547PG0961M	$417
Pentium 4 HT 550	SL7PP (E0); SL88L (E0); SL7KD (E0)	3.40 GHz	1024 KB	800 MT/s	17×	1.287-1.4 V	89 W, 103 W	Socket 478	Q2 2004	BX80546PG0961M; RK80546PG0961M	$417
Pentium 4 HT 550	SL8K4 (G1)	3.40 GHz	1024 KB	800 MT/s	17×	1.2-1.425 V	89 W, 103 W	Socket 478		RK80546PG0961M; NE80546PG0961M; BX80546PG3400E	
Pentium 4 HT 550J	SL7PY (E0); SL833 (E0)	3.40 GHz	1024 KB	800 MT/s	17×	1.25-1.4 V	115 W	LGA 775	October 2004	JM80547PG0961M	$417
Pentium 4 HT 551	SL8PS (E0); SL7PZ (E0); SL9C5 (E0); SL8J5 (D0)	3.40 GHz	1024 KB	800 MT/s	17×	1.2-1.425 V	115 W	LGA 775	June 12, 2005	JM80547PG0961MM; HH80547PG0961MM	$278
Pentium 4 HT 560	SL7J9 (D0); SL7KN (D0)	3.60 GHz	1024 KB	800 MT/s	18×	1.2-1.425 V	115 W	LGA 775	June 21, 2004	JM80547PG1041M	$637
Pentium 4 HT 560J	SL84X (E0); SL7Q2 (E0)	3.60 GHz	1024 KB	800 MT/s	18×	1.25-1.4 V	115 W	LGA 775	October 2004	JM80547PG1041M	$637
Pentium 4 HT 561	SL8J6 (E0) SL7NZ (E0)	3.60 GHz	1024 KB	800 MT/s	18×	1.2-1.425 V	115 W	LGA 775	June 12, 2005	JM80547PG1041MM	$417
Pentium 4 HT 570J	SL84Y (E0); SL82U (E0)	3.80 GHz	1024 KB	800 MT/s	19×	1.2-1.425 V	115 W	LGA 775	November 12, 2004	JM80547PG1121M	
Pentium 4 HT 571	SL8J7 (E0)	3.80 GHz	1024 KB	800 MT/s	19×	1.2-1.425 V	115 W	LGA 775	June 12, 2005	JM80547PG1121MM; JM80547PG1121M	$637
Pentium 4 HT 580	?	4.00 GHz	1024 KB	800 MT/s	20×	?	?	LGA 775	Cancelled	?	

==== Prescott 2M (90 nm) ====
- Intel Family 15 Model 4
- All models support: MMX, SSE, SSE2, SSE3, Hyper-threading, Intel 64, XD bit (an NX bit implementation)
- Intel VT-x supported by: 6x2 e.g. Model 662 and 672
- Enhanced Intel SpeedStep Technology (EIST) supported by: all except 620.
- Transistors: 169 million
- Die size: 135 mm^{2}
- Steppings: N0, R0

Model number	sSpec number	Frequency	L2 cache	FSB speed	Multiplier	Voltage range	TDP	Socket	Release date	Part number(s)	Release price (USD)
Pentium 4 HT 620	SL8AB (N0)	2.8 GHz	2 MB	800 MT/s	14×	1.2–1.4 V	84 W	LGA 775	February 20, 2005	JM80547PG0722MM; JM80547PH1072MM	
Pentium 4 HT 630	SL7Z9 (N0)	3.0 GHz	2 MB	800 MT/s	15×	1.2–1.4 V	84 W	LGA 775	February 20, 2005	JM80547PG0802M	$224
Pentium 4 HT 630	SL8Q7 (R0)	3.0 GHz	2 MB	800 MT/s	15×	1.2–1.4 V	84 W	LGA 775	February 20, 2005	HH80547PG0802MM	$224
Pentium 4 HT 640	SL7Z8 (N0)	3.2 GHz	2 MB	800 MT/s	16×	1.2–1.4 V	84 W	LGA 775	February 20, 2005	JM80547PG0882M	$273
Pentium 4 HT 640	SL8Q6 (R0)	3.2 GHz	2 MB	800 MT/s	16×	1.2–1.4 V	84 W	LGA 775	February 20, 2005	HH80547PG0882MM	$273
Pentium 4 HT 650	SL7Z7 (N0)	3.4 GHz	2 MB	800 MT/s	17×	1.2–1.4 V	84 W	LGA 775	February 20, 2005	JM80547PG0962M	$401
Pentium 4 HT 650	SL8Q5 (R0)	3.4 GHz	2 MB	800 MT/s	17×	1.2–1.4 V	84 W	LGA 775	February 20, 2005	HH80547PG0962MM	$401
Pentium 4 HT 660	SL7Z5 (N0)	3.6 GHz	2 MB	800 MT/s	18×	1.2–1.4 V	115 W	LGA 775	February 20, 2005	JM80547PG1042M	$605
Pentium 4 HT 660	SL8PZ (R0)	3.6 GHz	2 MB	800 MT/s	18×	1.2–1.4 V	115 W	LGA 775	February 20, 2005	HH80547PG1042MM	$605
Pentium 4 HT 662	SL8QB (R0); SL8UP (R0)	3.6 GHz	2 MB	800 MT/s	18×	1.2–1.4 V	115 W	LGA 775	November 14, 2005	HH80547PG1042MH	$401
Pentium 4 HT 670	SL7Z3 (N0)	3.8 GHz	2 MB	800 MT/s	19×	1.2–1.4 V	115 W	LGA 775	May 26, 2005	JM80547PG1122M	$851
Pentium 4 HT 670	SL8PY (R0)	3.8 GHz	2 MB	800 MT/s	19×	1.2–1.4 V	115 W	LGA 775	May 26, 2005	HH80547PG1122MM	$851
Pentium 4 HT 672	SL8Q9 (R0)	3.8 GHz	2 MB	800 MT/s	19×	1.2–1.4 V	115 W	LGA 775	November 14, 2005	HH80547PG1122MH	$605
Pentium 4 HT 4.00		4.0 GHz	2 MB	1066 MT/s	15×	1.2–1.4 V	115 W	LGA 775	Cancelled		

==== Cedar Mill (65 nm) ====
- Intel Family 15 Model 6
- All models support: MMX, SSE, SSE2, SSE3, Hyper-threading, Intel 64, XD bit (an NX bit implementation)
- Transistors: 188 million
- Die size: 81 mm^{2}
- Steppings: B1, C1, D0
- Enhanced Intel SpeedStep Technology (EIST) supported by: C1, D0 steppings

Model number	sSpec number	Frequency	L2 cache	FSB speed	Multiplier	Voltage range	TDP	Socket	Release date	Part number(s)	Release price (USD)
Pentium 4 HT 631	SL8WJ (B1); SL94Y (B1)	3 GHz	2 MB	800 MT/s	15×	1.25–1.325 V	86 W	LGA 775		HH80552PG0802M	$178
Pentium 4 HT 631	SL96L (C1)	3 GHz	2 MB	800 MT/s	15×	1.2–1.3375 V	86 W	LGA 775		HH80552PG0802M	$178
Pentium 4 HT 631	SL9KG (D0)	3 GHz	2 MB	800 MT/s	15×	1.2–1.325 V	65 W	LGA 775	N/A	HH80552PG0802M	$178
Pentium 4 HT 641	SL8WH (B1); SL94X (B1)	3.2 GHz	2 MB	800 MT/s	16×	1.25–1.4 V	86 W	LGA 775		HH80552PG0882M	$218
Pentium 4 HT 641	SL96K (C1)	3.2 GHz	2 MB	800 MT/s	16×	1.2–1.325 V	86 W	LGA 775		HH80552PG0882M	$218
Pentium 4 HT 641	SL9KF (D0)	3.2 GHz	2 MB	800 MT/s	16×	1.2–1.325 V	65 W	LGA 775	N/A	HH80552PG0882M	$218
Pentium 4 HT 651	SL8WG (B1); SL94W (B1)	3.4 GHz	2 MB	800 MT/s	17×	1.25–1.4 V	86 W	LGA 775		HH80552PG0962M	$273
Pentium 4 HT 651	SL96J (C1)	3.4 GHz	2 MB	800 MT/s	17×	1.2–1.325 V	86 W	LGA 775		HH80552PG0962M	$273
Pentium 4 HT 651	SL9KE (D0)	3.4 GHz	2 MB	800 MT/s	17×	1.2–1.325 V	65 W	LGA 775	N/A	HH80552PG0962M	$273
Pentium 4 HT 661	SL8WF (B1); SL94V (B1)	3.6 GHz	2 MB	800 MT/s	18×	1.25–1.4 V	86 W	LGA 775		HH80552PG1042M	$401
Pentium 4 HT 661	SL96H (C1)	3.6 GHz	2 MB	800 MT/s	18×	1.2–1.325 V	86 W	LGA 775		HH80552PG1042M	$401
Pentium 4 HT 661	SL9KD (D0)	3.6 GHz	2 MB	800 MT/s	18×	1.2–1.325 V	65 W	LGA 775		HH80552PG1042M	$401

=== Pentium 4 Extreme Edition ===
==== Gallatin (130 nm) ====
- All models support: MMX, SSE, SSE2, Hyper-threading
- All models equipped with integrated L3 cache
- Transistors: 169 million (Note: Both 169 and 178 million are claimed.)
- Die size: 237 mm^{2}
- Steppings: N0

Model number	sSpec number	Clock speed	L2	L3	FSB speed	Clock multiplier	Voltage range	TDP	Socket	Release date	Part number(s)	Release price (USD)
Pentium 4 Extreme Edition 3.2	SL7AA (M0)	3.2 GHz	512	2MB	800 MT/s	16×	1.55V	92.1 W	Socket 478	November 3, 2003	BX80532PG3200F; RK80532PG0882M	$925
Pentium 4 Extreme Edition 3.4	SL7CH (M0)	3.4 GHz	512	2MB	800 MT/s	17×	1.575 V	102.9 W	Socket 478	February 2, 2004	BX80532PG3400F; RK80532PG0962M	$999
Pentium 4 Extreme Edition 3.4	SL7GD (M0)	3.4 GHz	512	2MB	800 MT/s	17x	0.956–1.052 V	109.6 W	LGA 775	June 21, 2004	BX80532PH3400FS; JM80532PG0962M	$999
Pentium 4 Extreme Edition 3.4	SL7RR (M0)	3.4 GHz	512	2MB	800 MT/s	17x	1.25–1.4 V	109.6 W	LGA 775	N/A	BX80532PH3400FS; B80532PG0962MS	N/A
Pentium 4 Extreme Edition 3.46	SL7NF (M0)	3.46 GHz	512	2MB	1066 MT/s	13×	1.287–1.4 V	110.7 W	LGA 775	October 31, 2004	BX80532PH3460FS; JM80532PH0992M	$999
Pentium 4 Extreme Edition 3.46	SL7RT (M0)	3.46 GHz	512	2MB	1066 MT/s	13×	1.287–1.4 V	110.7 W	LGA 775	N/A	BX80532PH3460FS; B80532PH0992MS	$999

==== Prescott 2M (90 nm) ====
- All models support: MMX, SSE, SSE2, SSE3, Hyper-threading, EIST, Intel 64, XD bit (an NX bit implementation)
- Transistors: 169 million
- Die size: 135 mm^{2}
- Steppings: N0

Model number	sSpec number	Clock speed	L2 cache	FSB speed	Clock multiplier	Voltage range	TDP	Socket	Release date	Part number(s)	Release price (USD)
Pentium 4 Extreme Edition 3.73	SL7Z4 (N0)	3.73 GHz	2 MB	1066 MT/s	14×	1.200-1.400V	115 W	LGA 775	February 21, 2005	JM80547PH1092MM	$999

== Mobile processors ==
=== Pentium 4-M ===
==== Northwood (130 nm) ====
- All models support: MMX, SSE, SSE2, IST
- Die Size: 131 mm^{2} (initially 146 mm^{2})
- Package Size: 35 mm × 35 mm
- Steppings: B0, B0 Shrink, C1, D1

Model number	sSpec number	Frequency	L2 cache	FSB speed	Multiplier	Voltage range	TDP	Socket	Release date	Part number(s)	Release price (USD)
Pentium 4-M 1.4	SL5ZH (B0); SL5ZW (B0); SL6CE (B0 Shrink)	1.4 GHz	512 KB	400 MT/s	14×	1.2 V	25.8 W	Socket 478	April 23, 2002	RH80532GC017512	$198
Pentium 4-M 1.5	SL5YT (B0); SL5ZX (B0); SL6CF (B0 Shrink)	1.5 GHz	512 KB	400 MT/s	15×	1.3 V	26.9 W	Socket 478	April 23, 2002	RH80532GC025512	$268
Pentium 4-M 1.6	SL5YU (B0); SL5ZY (B0); SL6CG (B0 Shrink) SL6FF (C1)	1.6 GHz	512 KB	400 MT/s	16×	1.3 V	30 W	Socket 478	March 4, 2002	RH80532GC025512	$401
Pentium 4-M 1.7	SL5Z7 (B0); SL5ZZ (B0); SL6CH (B0 Shrink); SL6DS (C1) SL6FG (C1); SL6V6 (D1)	1.7 GHz	512 KB	400 MT/s	17×	1.3 V	30 W	Socket 478	March 4, 2002	RH80532GC029512	$508
Pentium 4-M 1.8	SL65Q (B0); SL69D (B0); SL6CJ (B0 Shrink); SL6FH (C1); SL6V7 (D1)	1.8 GHz	512 KB	400 MT/s	18×	1.3 V	30 W	Socket 478	April 23, 2002	RH80532GC033512	$637
Pentium 4-M 1.9	SL6DE (B0); SL6CK (B0 Shrink); SL6FJ (C1); SL6V8 (D1)	1.9 GHz	512 KB	400 MT/s	19×	1.3 V	32 W	Socket 478	June 24, 2002	RH80532GC037512	$401
Pentium 4-M 2.0	SL6DF (B0); SL6CL (B0 Shrink); SL6FK (C1); SL6V9 (D1)	2.0 GHz	512 KB	400 MT/s	20×	1.3 V	32 W	Socket 478	June 24, 2002	RH80532GC041512	$637
Pentium 4-M 2.2	SL6J5 (C1); SL6LR (C1); SL6VB (D1)	2.2 GHz	512 KB	400 MT/s	22×	1.3 V	35 W	Socket 478	September 16, 2002	RH80532GC049512	$562
Pentium 4-M 2.3	N/A	2.3 GHz	512 KB	400 MT/s	23×	1.3 V	35 W	Socket 478	September 16, 2002	N/A	OEM
Pentium 4-M 2.4	SL6K5 (C1); SL6LS (C1); SL6VC (D1)	2.4 GHz	512 KB	400 MT/s	24×	1.3 V	35 W	Socket 478	January 14, 2003	RH80532GC056512	$562
Pentium 4-M 2.5	SL6P2 (C1); SL6WY (D1)	2.5 GHz	512 KB	400 MT/s	25×	1.3 V	35 W	Socket 478	April 16, 2003	RH80532GC060512	$562
Pentium 4-M 2.6	SL6WZ (D1)	2.6 GHz	512 KB	400 MT/s	26×	1.3 V	35 W	Socket 478	June 11, 2003	RH80532GC064512	$562

=== Mobile Pentium 4 ===
==== Northwood (130 nm) ====
- All models support: MMX, SSE, SSE2, IST

Model number	sSpec number	Clock speed	L2 cache	FSB speed	Clock multiplier	Voltage range	TDP	Socket	Release date	Part number(s)	Release Price (USD)
Mobile Pentium 4 2.4	SL723 (D1)	2.4 GHz	512 KB	533 MT/s	18×	1.2–1.55 V	59.8 W	Socket 478	June 11, 2003	RK80532GE056512	$186
Mobile Pentium 4 2.66	SL724 (D1)	2.66 GHz	512 KB	533 MT/s	20×	1.2–1.55 V	66.1 W	Socket 478	June 11, 2003	RK80532GE067512	$218
Mobile Pentium 4 2.8	SL725 (D1)	2.8 GHz	512 KB	533 MT/s	21×	1.2–1.55 V	68.4 W	Socket 478	June 11, 2003	RK80532GE072512	$278
Mobile Pentium 4 3.06	SL726 (D1)	3.06 GHz	512 KB	533 MT/s	23×	1.2–1.55 V	70 W	Socket 478	June 11, 2003	RK80532GE083512	$417

=== Mobile Pentium 4 HT ===
==== Northwood (130 nm) ====
- All models support: MMX, SSE, SSE2, IST, Hyper-threading

Model number	sSpec number	Clock speed	L2 cache	FSB speed	Clock multiplier	Voltage range	TDP	Socket	Release date	Part number(s)	Release price (USD)
Mobile Pentium 4 HT 2.66	SL77M (D1)	2.66 GHz	512 KB	533 MT/s	20×	1.2V-1.55V	66.1 W	Socket 478	September 23, 2003	RK80532HE067512	$234
Mobile Pentium 4 HT 2.8	SL77N (D1)	2.8 GHz	512 KB	533 MT/s	21×	1.2V-1.55V	68.4 W	Socket 478	September 23, 2003	RK80532HE072512	$294
Mobile Pentium 4 HT 3.06	SL77P (D1)	3.06 GHz	512 KB	533 MT/s	23×	1.2V-1.55V	70 W	Socket 478	September 23, 2003	RK80532HE083512	$433
Mobile Pentium 4 HT 3.2	SL77R (D1)	3.2 GHz	512 KB	533 MT/s	24×	1.2V-1.55V	76 W	Socket 478	September 23, 2003	RK80532HE088512	$653

==== Prescott (90 nm) ====
- All models support: MMX, SSE, SSE2, SSE3, IST, Thermal Monitor 2, Hyper-threading
- Steppings: D0, E0

Model number	sSpec number	Clock speed	L2 cache	FSB speed	Clock multiplier	Voltage range	TDP	Socket	Release date	Part number(s)	Release price (USD)
Mobile Pentium 4 HT 518	SL7DS (D0)	2.8 GHz	1 MB	533 MT/s	21×	1.25–1.4 V	88 W	Socket 478	June 1, 2004	RK80546HE0721M	$202
Mobile Pentium 4 HT 518	SL7N8 (E0)	2.8 GHz	1 MB	533 MT/s	21×	1.25–1.4 V	88 W	Socket 478	October 1, 2004	RK80546HE0721M	$202
Mobile Pentium 4 HT 532	SL7DT (D0)	3.06 GHz	1 MB	533 MT/s	23×	1.25–1.4 V	88 W	Socket 478	June 1, 2004	RK80546HE0831M	$234
Mobile Pentium 4 HT 532	SL7NA (E0)	3.06 GHz	1 MB	533 MT/s	23×	1.25–1.4 V	88 W	Socket 478	October 1, 2004	RK80546HE0831M	$234
Mobile Pentium 4 HT 538	SL7DU (D0)	3.2 GHz	1 MB	533 MT/s	24×	1.25–1.4 V	88 W	Socket 478	June 1, 2004	RK80546HE0881M	$294
Mobile Pentium 4 HT 538	SL7NB (E0)	3.2 GHz	1 MB	533 MT/s	24×	1.25–1.4 V	88 W	Socket 478	October 1, 2004	RK80546HE0881M	$294
Mobile Pentium 4 HT 548	SL7X5 (E0)	3.33 GHz	1 MB	533 MT/s	25×	1.25–1.4 V	88 W	Socket 478	September 28, 2004	RK80546HE0931M	$262
Mobile Pentium 4 HT 552	SL7NC (E0)	3.46 GHz	1 MB	533 MT/s	26×	1.25–1.4 V	88 W	Socket 478	January 4, 2005	RK80546HE0991M	N/A

== See also ==
- List of Intel Pentium processors
- List of Intel Pentium D processors
- List of Intel Celeron processors (NetBurst-based)
- List of Intel Xeon processors (NetBurst-based)
