= LGA 77x =

LGA 77x may refer to:

- LGA 775 (Socket T)
- LGA 771 (Socket J)
