= List of Intel Pentium M processors =

This is a list of Intel Pentium M processors. They are all single-core 32-bit CPUs codenamed Banias and Dothan, and targeted at the consumer market of mobile computers.

== Mobile processors ==
=== Pentium M ===
==== "Banias" (130 nm) ====
- All models support: MMX, SSE, SSE2, Enhanced Intel SpeedStep Technology (EIST)
- Die size: 83 mm^{2}

Model	Clock rate	L2 cache	FSB	Mult.	Voltage	TDP	Socket	Release date	Release price (USD)
Pentium M 1.3	1.3 GHz	1 MB	400 MT/s	13×	0.956–1.388 V	22 W	Socket 479	March 12, 2003	$292
Pentium M 1.4	1.4 GHz	1 MB	400 MT/s	14×	0.956–1.388 V	22 W	Socket 479	March 12, 2003	$377
Pentium M 1.5	1.5 GHz	1 MB	400 MT/s	15×	0.956–1.484 V	24.5 W	Socket 479	March 12, 2003	$506
Pentium M 705	1.5 GHz	1 MB	400 MT/s	15×	0.956–1.484 V	24.5 W	Socket 479	May 10, 2004	
Pentium M 1.6	1.6 GHz	1 MB	400 MT/s	16×	0.956–1.484 V	24.5 W	Socket 479	March 12, 2003	$720
Pentium M 1.7	1.7 GHz	1 MB	400 MT/s	17×	0.956–1.484 V	24.5 W	Socket 479	June 2, 2003	$725
Pentium M 1.8	1.8 GHz	1 MB	400 MT/s	18×	0.956–1.484 V	24.5 W	Socket 479	May 10, 2004	
Pentium M LV 1.1	1.1 GHz	1 MB	400 MT/s	11×	0.956–1.18 V	12 W	Socket 479	March 12, 2003	$345
Pentium M LV 1.2	1.2 GHz	1 MB	400 MT/s	12×	0.956–1.18 V	12 W	Socket 479	June 2, 2003	$372
Pentium M LV 718	1.3 GHz	1 MB	400 MT/s	13×	0.956–1.18 V	12 W	Socket 479	April 6, 2004	$284
Pentium M ULV 900	900 MHz	1 MB	400 MT/s	9×	0.844–1.004 V	7 W	Socket 479	March 12, 2003	$324
Pentium M ULV 1.0	1 GHz	1 MB	400 MT/s	10×	0.844–1.004 V	7 W	Socket 479	June 2, 2003	$350
Pentium M ULV 713	1.1 GHz	1 MB	400 MT/s	11×	0.844–1.004 V	7 W	Socket 479	April 6, 2004	$262

==== "Dothan" (90 nm) ====
- All models support: MMX, SSE, SSE2, Enhanced Intel SpeedStep Technology (EIST)
- PAE, XD bit (an NX bit implementation): supported by C0 stepping
- Die size: 87 mm^{2}
- Steppings: B0, B1, C0
- C1 stepping Pentium M's are fabbed on a 65 nm process with an actual C0 stepping

Model	Clock rate	L2 cache	FSB	Mult.	Voltage	TDP	Socket	Release date	Release price (USD)
Pentium M 710	1.4 GHz	2 MB	400 MT/s	14×	0.988–1.34 V	21 W	Socket 479	June 23, 2004	OEM
Pentium M 715	1.5 GHz	2 MB	400 MT/s	15×	0.988–1.34 V	21 W	Socket 479	June 23, 2004	$209
Pentium M 715A	1.5 GHz	2 MB	400 MT/s	15×	0.988–1.34 V	21 W	Socket 479	May 10, 2004	OEM
Pentium M 725	1.6 GHz	2 MB	400 MT/s	16×	0.988–1.34 V	21 W	Socket 479	June 23, 2004	$241
Pentium M 725A	1.6 GHz	2 MB	400 MT/s	16×	0.988–1.34 V	21 W	Socket 479	July 2005	OEM
Pentium M 730	1.6 GHz	2 MB	533 MT/s	12×	1.26–1.356 V	27 W	Socket 479	January 19, 2005	$209
Pentium M 735	1.7 GHz	2 MB	400 MT/s	17×	0.988–1.34 V	21 W	Socket 479	May 10, 2004	$294
Pentium M 735A	1.7 GHz	2 MB	400 MT/s	17×	0.988–1.34 V	21 W	Socket 479	May 10, 2004	OEM
Pentium M 740	1.73 GHz	2 MB	533 MT/s	13×	1.26–1.356 V	27 W	Socket 479	January 19, 2005	$241
Pentium M 745	1.8 GHz	2 MB	400 MT/s	18×	1.276–1.34 V	21 W	Socket 479	May 10, 2004	$423
Pentium M 745A	1.8 GHz	2 MB	400 MT/s	18×	1.276–1.34 V	21 W	Socket 479	May 10, 2004	OEM
Pentium M 750	1.87 GHz	2 MB	533 MT/s	14×	1.26–1.356 V	27 W	Socket 479	January 19, 2005	$294
Pentium M 755	2 GHz	2 MB	400 MT/s	20×	0.988–1.34 V	21 W	Socket 479	May 10, 2004	$637
Pentium M 760	2 GHz	2 MB	533 MT/s	15×	1.26–1.356 V	27 W	Socket 479	January 19, 2005	$423
Pentium M 765	2.1 GHz	2 MB	400 MT/s	21×	0.988–1.356 V	21 W	Socket 479	October 20, 2004	$637
Pentium M 770	2.13 GHz	2 MB	533 MT/s	16×	1.26–1.372 V	27 W	Socket 479	January 19, 2005	$637
Pentium M 780	2.27 GHz	2 MB	533 MT/s	17×	1.26–1.404 V	27 W	Socket 479	July 25, 2005	$637
Pentium M LV 738	1.4 GHz	2 MB	400 MT/s	14×	0.988–1.116 V	10 W	Socket 479	July 20, 2004	$284
Pentium M LV 758	1.5 GHz	2 MB	400 MT/s	15×	0.988–1.116 V	7.5 W	Socket 479	January 19, 2005	$284
Pentium M LV 778	1.6 GHz	2 MB	400 MT/s	16×	0.988–1.116 V	10 W	Socket 479	January 19, 2005	$284
Pentium M ULV 723	1 GHz	2 MB	400 MT/s	10×	0.812–0.94 V	5 W	Socket 479	July 20, 2004	$241
Pentium M ULV 733	1.1 GHz	2 MB	400 MT/s	11×	0.812–0.956 V	5 W	Socket 479	July 20, 2004	$262
Pentium M ULV 733J	1.1 GHz	2 MB	400 MT/s	11×	0.812–0.956 V	5 W	Socket 479	July 2005	$262
Pentium M ULV 753	1.2 GHz	2 MB	400 MT/s	12×	0.812–0.956 V	5.5 W	Socket 479	January 19, 2005	$262
Pentium M ULV 773	1.3 GHz	2 MB	400 MT/s	13×	0.812–0.956 V	5.5 W	Socket 479	January 19, 2005	$262

== See also ==
- List of Intel Pentium processors
- List of Intel Pentium 4 processors § Mobile processors
- Pentium M (microarchitecture)
