= Pentium M =

Family of Intel microprocessors

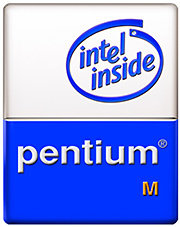
- First logo used from 2003 to 2006

General information
- Launched: March 12, 2003; 23 years ago
- Discontinued: July 14, 2009; 17 years ago
- Marketed by: Intel
- Designed by: Intel
- Common manufacturer: Intel
- CPUID code: 695h (Banias); 0x6DX (Dothan)
- Product code: Banias: 80535; Dothan: 80536

Performance
- Max. CPU clock rate: 900 MHz to 2.26 GHz
- FSB speeds: 400 MT/s to 533 MT/s
- Data width: 64 bits
- Address width: 36 bits
- Virtual address width: 32 bits

Physical specifications
- Transistors: Banias: 77 million; Dothan: 140 million
- Cores: 1
- Packages: Micro pin grid array (mPGA); High performance ball grid array (H-PBGA)
- Sockets: Socket 479; H-PBGA479

Cache
- L1 cache: 64 KB (32 KB data + 32 KB instructions)
- L2 cache: 1 MB or 2 MB, shared

Architecture and classification
- Application: Mobile
- Technology node: 130 nm to 90 nm
- Microarchitecture: P6
- Instruction set: x86-16, IA-32
- Extensions: MMX, SSE, SSE2, EIST, XD bit

Products, models, variants
- Core names: Banias; Dothan
- Variant: Celeron M

History
- Predecessor: Pentium 4 M
- Successors: Intel Core (Yonah); Stealey

Support status
- Unsupported

The Pentium M is Intel's family of mobile 32-bit single-core x86 microprocessors based on the sixth-generation P6 microarchitecture introduced in March 2003 and forming a part of the Intel Carmel notebook platform under the then new Centrino brand. The Pentium M processors had a maximum thermal design power (TDP) of 5–27 W depending on the model, and were intended for use in laptops (thus the "M" suffix standing for mobile). They evolved from the core of the last Pentium III–branded CPU by adding the front-side bus (FSB) interface of Pentium 4, an improved instruction decoding and issuing front end, improved branch prediction, SSE2 support, and a much larger cache.

The Pentium M replaced the laptop version of the Pentium 4 (the Pentium 4-Mobile, or P4-M), which suffered from power consumption and heat problems. The first Pentium M–branded CPU, code-named Banias, was followed by Dothan. The Pentium M line was removed from the official price lists in July 2009, when the Pentium M-branded processors were succeeded by the mobile Pentium Dual-Core line.

== Overview ==
The Pentium M represented a new and radical departure for Intel, as it was not only the flagship processor line for notebooks from 2003 to 2006, but is rather a heavily modified version of the Pentium III Tualatin design (itself based on the Pentium II core design, which in turn had been a heavily improved evolution of the Pentium Pro). It is optimized for power efficiency, a vital characteristic for extending notebook computer battery life. Running with very low average power consumption and much lower heat output than desktop processors, the Pentium M runs at a lower clock speed than the laptop version of the Pentium 4 (the Pentium 4-Mobile, or P4-M), but with similar performance – a 1.6 GHz Pentium M can typically attain or even surpass the performance of a 2.4 GHz Pentium 4-M. The Pentium M 740 has been tested to perform up to approximately 7,400 MIPS and 3.9 GFLOPS (using SSE2).

The Pentium M coupled the execution core of the Pentium III with a Pentium 4 compatible bus interface, an improved instruction decoding/issuing front end, improved branch prediction, SSE2 support, and a much larger cache. The usually power-hungry secondary cache uses an access method which only switches on the portion being accessed. The main intention behind the large cache was to keep a decent-sized portion of it still available to the processor even when most of the L2 cache was switched off, but its size led to a welcome improvement in performance.

Other power saving methods include dynamically variable clock frequency and core voltage, allowing the Pentium M to throttle clock speed when the system is idle in order to conserve energy, using the SpeedStep 3 technology (which has more sleep stages than previous versions of SpeedStep). With this technology, a 1.6 GHz Pentium M can effectively throttle to clock speeds of 600 MHz, 800 MHz, 1000 MHz, 1200 MHz, 1400 MHz and 1600 MHz; these intermediate clock states allow the CPU to better throttle clock speed to suit conditions. The power requirements of the Pentium M varies from 5 watts when idle to 27 watts at full load. This is useful to notebook manufacturers as it allows them to include the Pentium M into smaller notebooks.

Although Intel marketed the Pentium M exclusively as a mobile product, motherboard manufacturers such as AOpen, DFI and MSI shipped Pentium M compatible boards designed to non-mobile enthusiasts, HTPC, workstation and server applications. An adapter, the CT-479, was developed by ASUS to allow the use of Pentium M processors in selected ASUS motherboards designed for Socket 478 Pentium 4 processors. Shuttle Inc. offered packaged Pentium M desktops, marketed for low energy consumption and minimal cooling system noise. Pentium M processors are also of interest to embedded systems' manufacturers because the low power consumption of the Pentium M allows the design of fanless and miniaturized embedded PCs. The Pentium M also responds very well to undervolting, which can be done with the program Notebook Hardware Control or RMClock.

Intel Pentium M processor family
Original logo	2006 logo	Laptop		
Original logo	2006 logo	Code-name	Process	Date released
Original Pentium M logo	Pentium M logo as of 2006	Banias	130 nm	Mar 2003
Original Pentium M logo	Pentium M logo as of 2006	Dothan	90 nm	Jun 2004
List of Intel Pentium M processors

== Banias ==
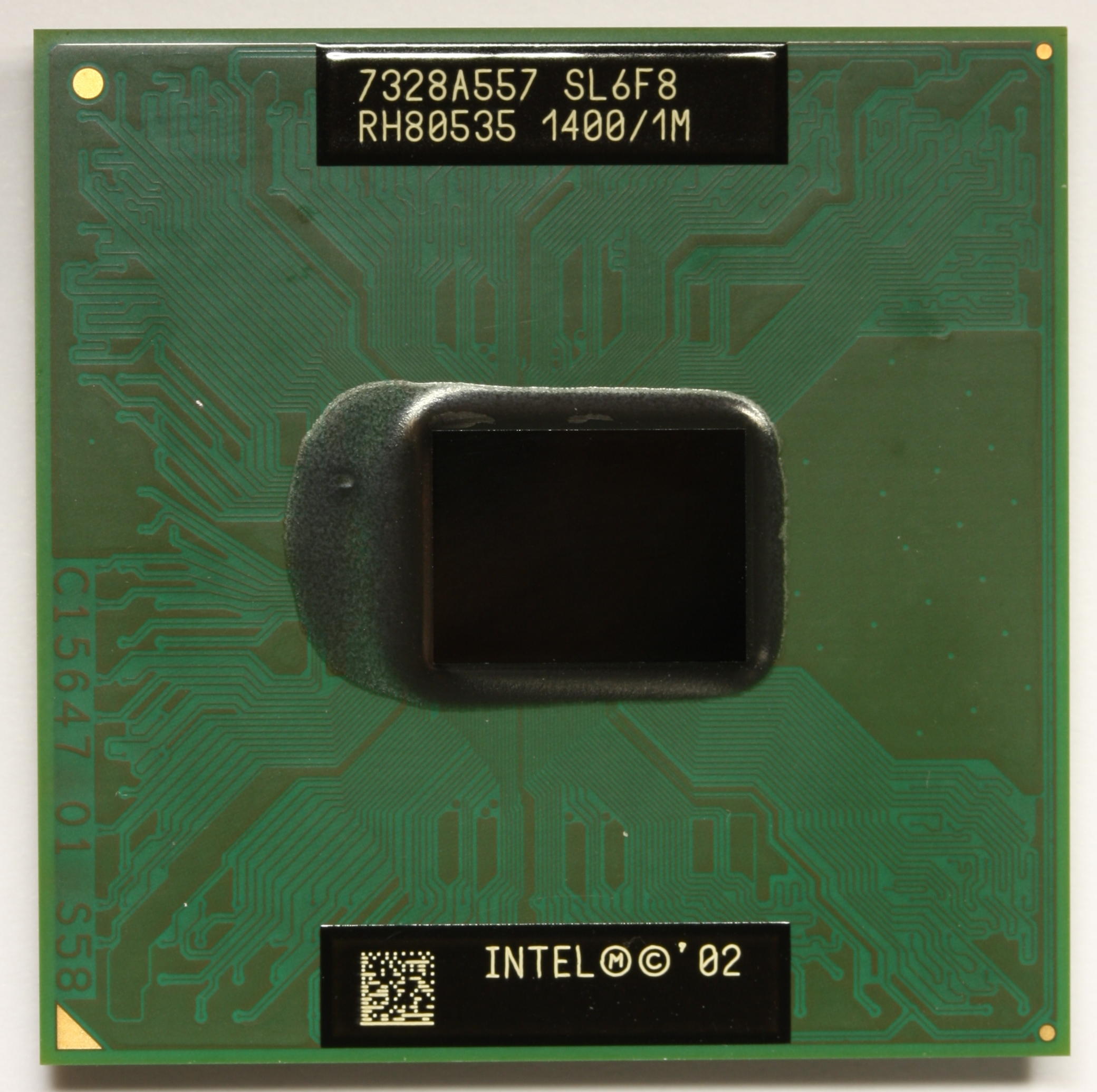
Pentium M 1.4/1M with Banias core

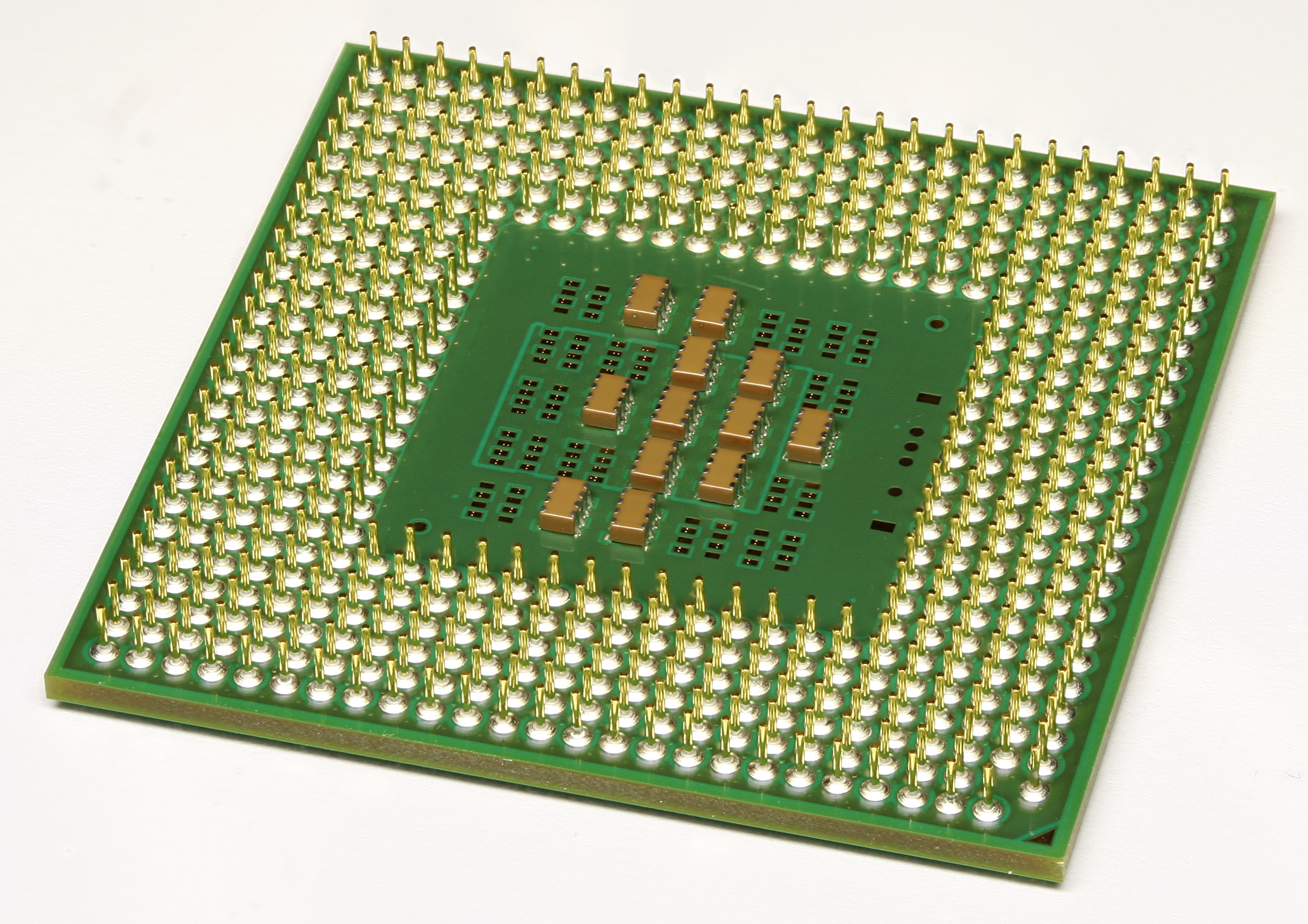
Backside of a Pentium M 1.4

The Intel Haifa team had previously been working on the memory controller for Timna, which was based on earlier P6 memory controller designs giving them detailed knowledge of P6 architecture which they used when Intel gave them a crash project to create a backup mobile CPU. As the M line was originally designed in Israel, the first Pentium M was identified by the codename Banias, named after an ancient site in the Golan Heights. Given the product code 80535, it initially had no model number suffix, but was later identified as the Pentium M 705. It was manufactured on a 130 nm process, was released at frequencies from 900 MHz to 1.7 GHz using a 400 MT/s FSB, and had 1 megabyte (MB) of Level 2 cache. The core average TDP (Thermal Design Power) is 24.5 watts.

The Banias family processors internally support Physical Address Extension (PAE) but do not show the PAE support flag in their CPUID information; this causes some operating systems (primarily Linux distributions) to refuse to boot on such processors since PAE support is required in their kernels. Using the 'forcepae' Linux boot option will allow Linux to boot using PAE in these cases. Windows 8 and later also refuses to boot on these processors for the same reason, as they specifically require PAE support to run properly. Attempting to boot Windows 8 and later with these processors installed (as well as on early Dothan family processors without PAE support flag enabled in their CPUID info) will result in a crash when attempting to load ntoskrnl.exe early on in the boot process, with error code 0xc0000260 (UNSUPPORTED_PROCESSOR).

== Dothan ==
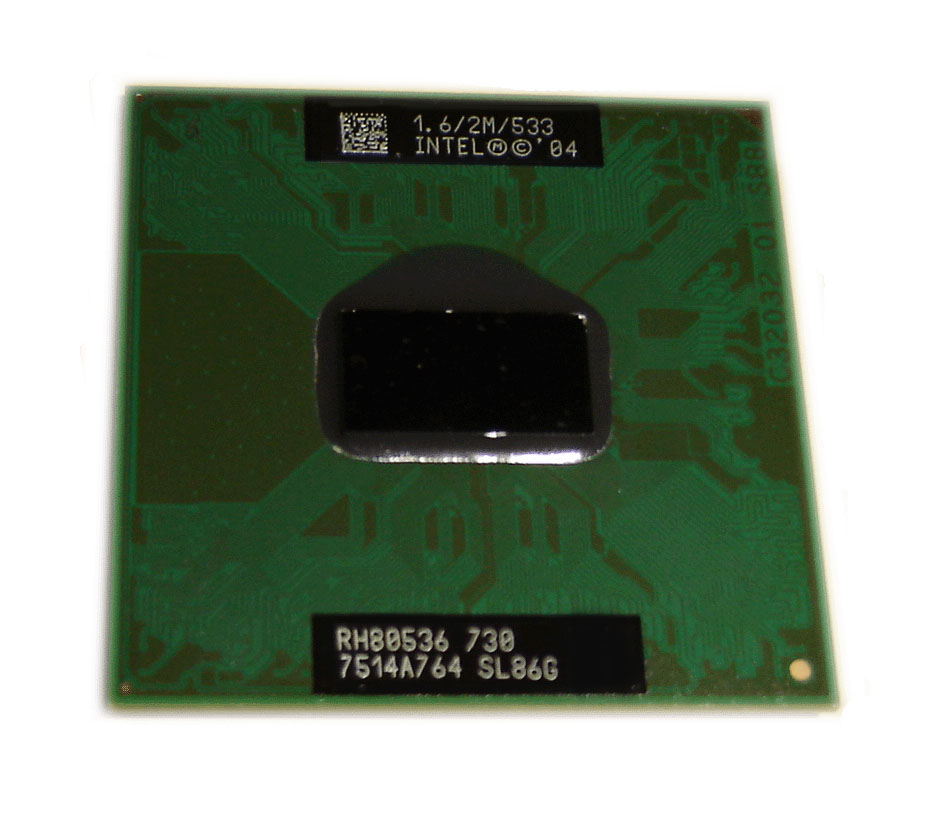
Pentium M 730 (1.6/2M/533) with Dothan core

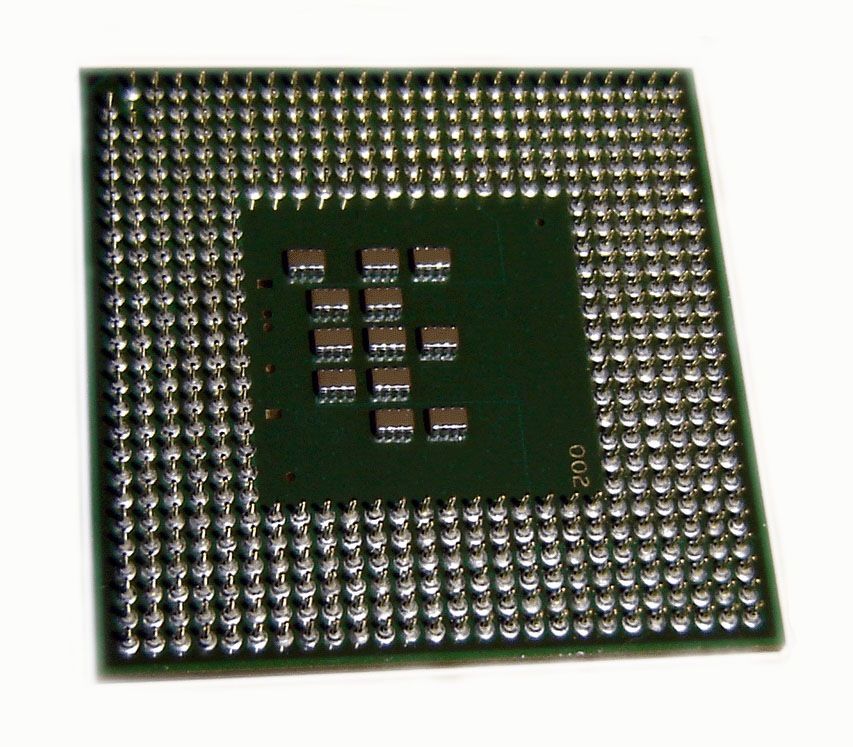
The backside of a Dothan core Pentium M 730

On September 17, 2003, Intel unveiled plans for releasing its then next-generation of Pentium M processors, codenamed "Dothan" by them. It was named after another ancient town in Israel, and it launched formally on May 10, 2004. Dothan Pentium M processors (product code 80536, CPUID 0x6DX) are among the first Intel processors to be identified using a "processor number" rather than a clockspeed rating; this allowed for more precise distinctions between different kinds of processors. The initial Dothan versions with the 400MT/s Front-Side-Bus (FSB) are known as Pentium M 710 (1.4 GHz), 715 (1.5 GHz), 725 (1.6 GHz), 735 (1.7 GHz), 745 (1.8 GHz), 755 (2.0 GHz), and 765 (2.1 GHz). These initial Dothan models all have a TDP of 21 W and a 2 MB L2 cache.

These 700 series Dothan Pentium M processors retain the same basic design as the original Banias Pentium M, but are manufactured on a 90 nm process, with twice the secondary cache. Die size, at 87 mm^{2}, remains in the same neighborhood as the original Pentium M, even though the 1000 series contains approximately 140 million transistors, most of which make up the 2 MB cache. TDP is also down to 21 watts with the 400 MT/s FSB (from 24.5 watts in Banias), though power use at lower clockspeeds has increased highly. However, tests conducted by third party hardware review sites show that Banias and Dothan equipped notebooks have roughly equivalent battery life. Additionally third party hardware review sites have benchmarked the Dothan at approx 10-20% better performance than the Banias in most situations.

Revisions of the Dothan core were released in the first quarter of 2005 with the Sonoma chipsets and supported a 533 MT/s FSB and XD (Intel's name for the NX bit); and the PAE support flag in the CPUID was enabled, unlike earlier Pentium Ms that showed PAE unavailable. This resolved boot errors in Linux distributions as well as with Windows 8 and later. These revised Dothan processors include the 730 (1.6 GHz), 740 (1.73 GHz), 750 (1.86 GHz), 760 (2.0 GHz), 770 (2.13 GHz) and 780 (2.26 GHz) and have a TDP of 27 W and a 2 MB L2 cache.

In July 2005, Intel released the 780 (2.26 GHz) and the low-voltage 778 (1.60 GHz).

The processor line had models running at clock speeds from 1.0 GHz to 2.26 GHz. The models with lower frequencies were either low voltage or ultra-low voltage CPUs designed for improved battery life and reduced heat output. The 718 (1.3 GHz), 738 (1.4 GHz), and 758 (1.5 GHz) models are low-voltage (1.116 V) with a TDP of 10 W, while the 723 (1.0 GHz), 733 (1.1 GHz), and 753 (1.2 GHz) models are ultra-low voltage (0.940 V) with a TDP of 5 W.

== Intel A100 series ==
An ultra low-power microprocessor based on the Dothan built on a 90 nm process with 512 KB L2 cache and 400 MT/s front side bus (FSB).

== Core Solo and Core Duo ==
The next generation of processors, codenamed Yonah, were based on the Enhanced Pentium M architecture, and released under the Intel Core brand, as Core Duo and Core Solo.

== See also ==
- P6 (microarchitecture)
- Centrino
- List of Intel Pentium M processors
