= Socket 479 =

CPU socket

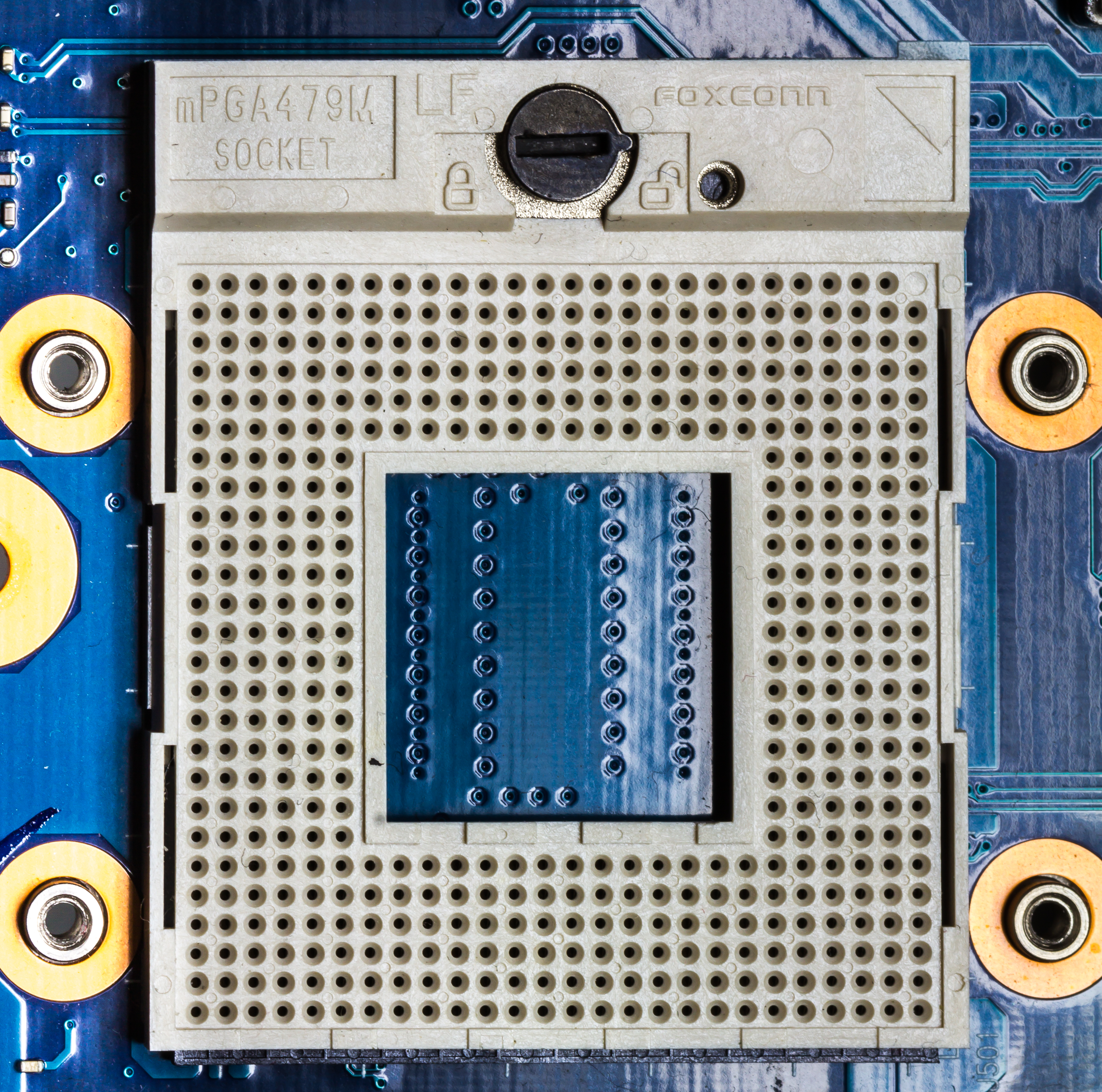
- Type: PGA-ZIF
- Chip form factors: Flip-chip pin grid array (FC-PGA2)
- Contacts: 479 on the socket, 478 or 479 pins on the processor, 478 contacts used
- FSB protocol: AGTL+
- FSB frequency: 100 MT/s, 133 MT/s (Pentium III, Celeron); 400 MT/s, 533 MT/s (Pentium M, Celeron M)
- Voltage range: 1.15-1.4V (Pentium III, Celeron); 0.8-1.4V (Pentium M, Celeron M)
- Processor dimensions: 35 mm × 35 mm
- Processors: Intel Pentium III; Intel Celeron; Intel Pentium M Intel Celeron M VIA C7-M
- Predecessor: Socket 495
- Successor: Socket M
- This article is part of the CPU socket series

Socket 479 is a CPU socket used by some Intel microprocessors normally found in laptops.

There were two versions of Socket 479 made; the first was designed for use with Tualatin-M Celeron and Pentium III mobile processors (also known as mPGA478A), while the second and most common version was used for Celeron M and Pentium M mobile processors (also known as mPGA479M and alternatively as mPGA478C).

The official naming by Intel for Celeron M and Pentium M Socket 479 sockets is μFCPGA and μPGA479M.

== Technical specifications ==
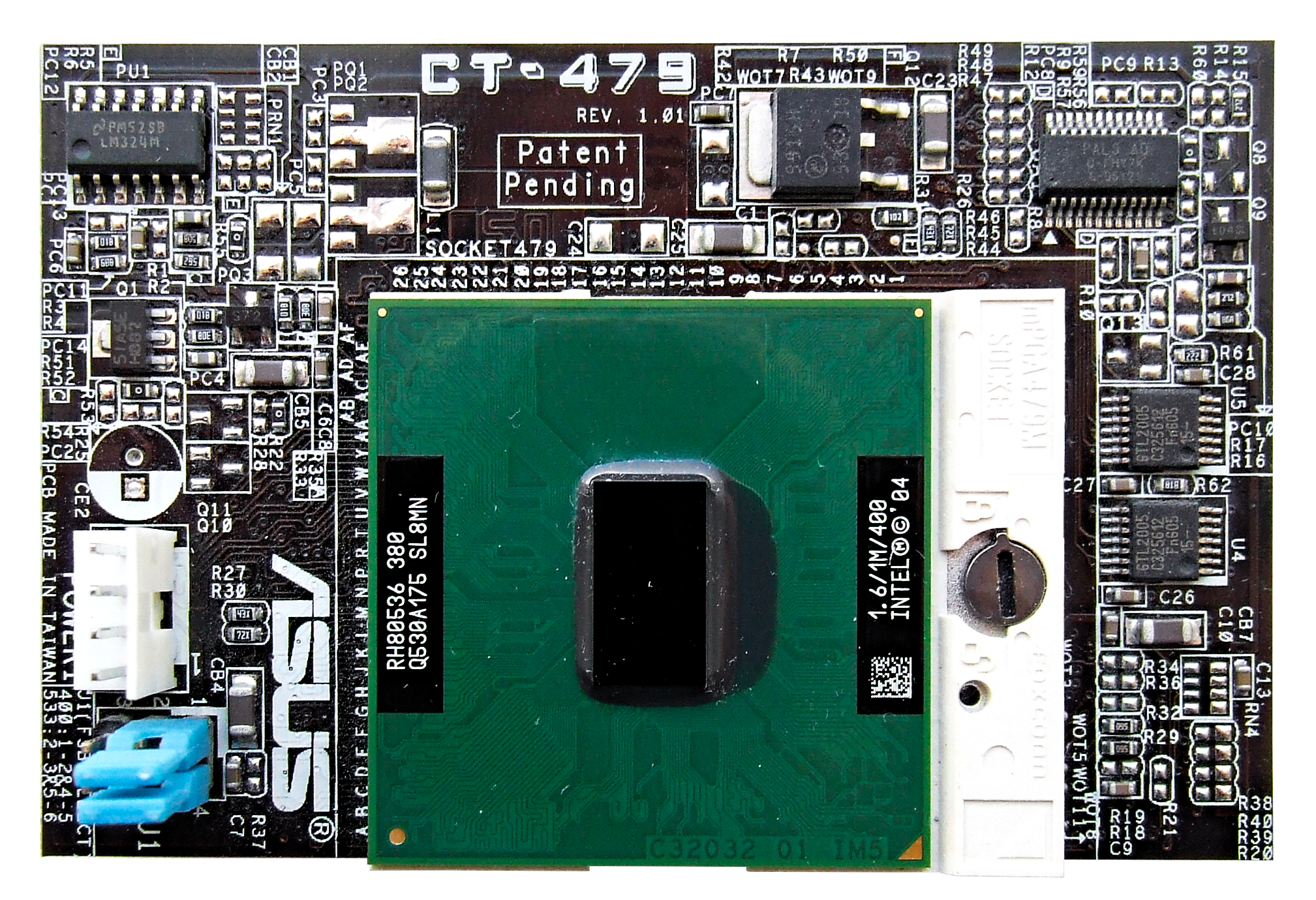
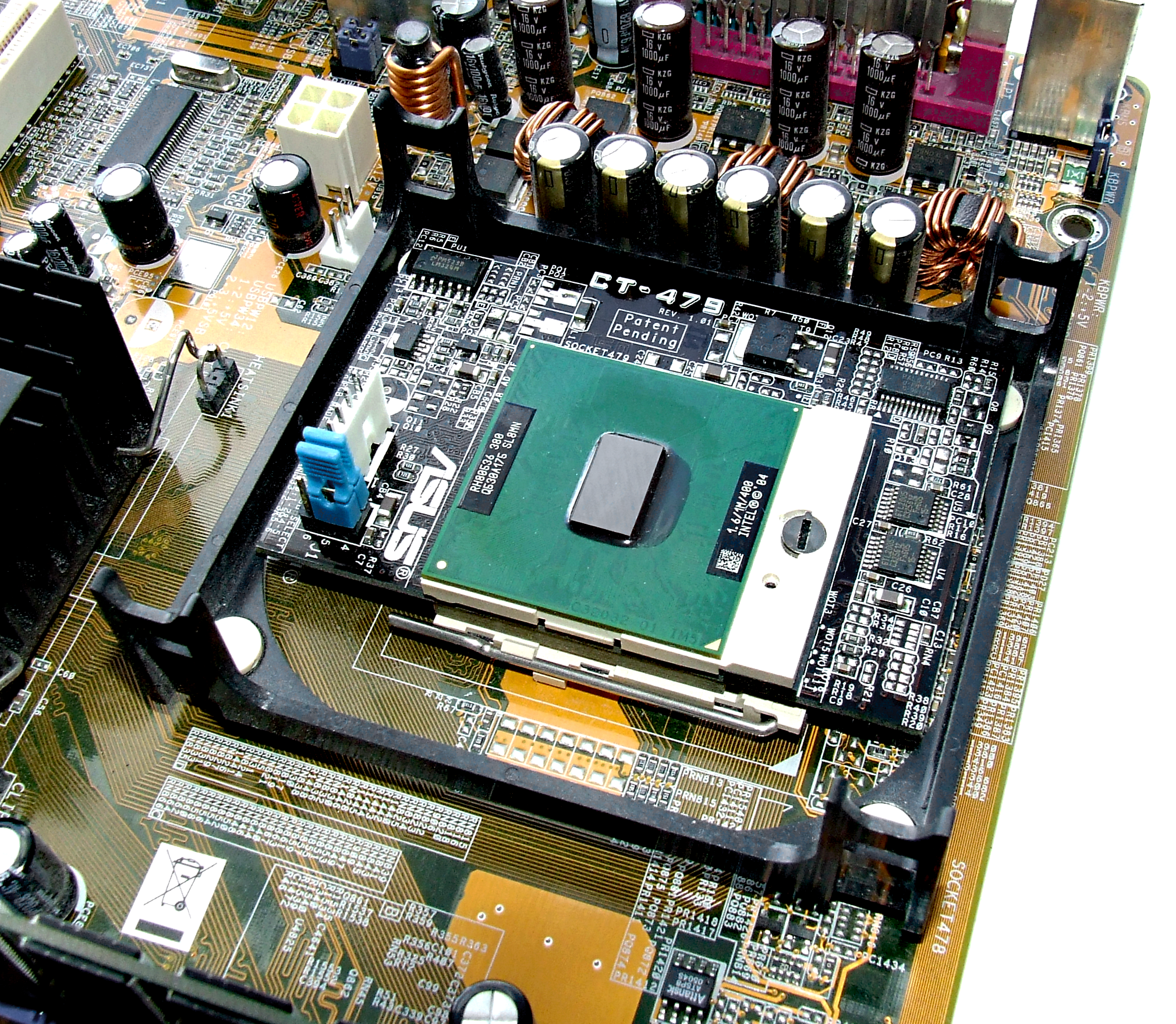
An Asus CT-479 adapter (top), installed onto an Asus P4GPL-X motherboard (bottom)

Socket 479 has 479 pin holes. Pentium M processors in PGA package have 479 pins that plug into this zero insertion force socket. Only 478 pins are electrically connected (B2 is reserved and "depopulated on the Micro-FCPGA package").

Although mechanically similar, Socket 478 has one pin fewer, making it impossible to use a Pentium M processor in a Socket 478 board. For this reason, some manufacturers like Asus have made drop-in boards (e.g. CT-479) which allow the use of Socket 479 processors in Socket 478 boards. Conversely, it is impossible to use any Socket 478 desktop Celeron and Pentium 4 processors in a Socket 479 board as they are electrically incompatible with Socket 479 despite being mechanically pin-compatible. For the same reason, Celeron M and Pentium M processors are pin and electrically incompatible with Pentium III-based Socket 479 boards.

Chipsets which employ this socket for the Pentium M are the Intel 855GM/GME/PM, the Intel 915GM/GMS/PM and the VIA family of chipsets such as the VN800. While the Intel 855GME chipset supports all Pentium M CPU's, the Intel 855GM chipset does not officially support 90 nm 2MB L2 cache (Dothan core) models (even though it works, it only runs at 400 MT/s FSB; some users were able to overclock the FSB to 533 MT/s on 855GM/GME/PM chipsets to support 90 nm 2MB L2 cache Dothan cores). The other difference is the 855GM chipset graphics core runs at 200 MHz while the 855GME runs at 250 MHz.

In 2006, Intel released the successor to Socket 479 with a revised pinout for its Core processor, called Socket M. Socket M supports a 667 MT/s FSB with the Intel 945PM/945GM chipsets. This socket has the placement of one pin changed from the Pentium M version of Socket 479, resembling that of the Pentium III version of Socket 479 (albeit electrically incompatible); Socket M processors will physically fit into a Socket 479, but are electrically incompatible with most versions of Socket 479 (except using ATI north bridge RC415MD).

== Socket and naming confusion ==
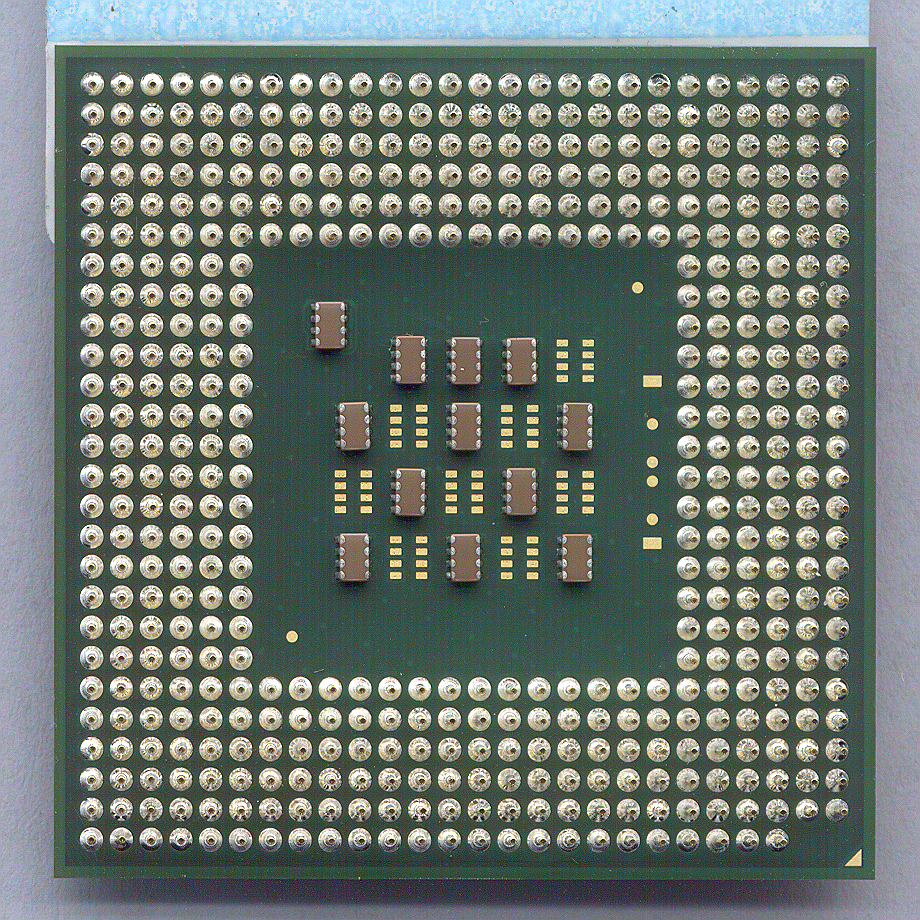
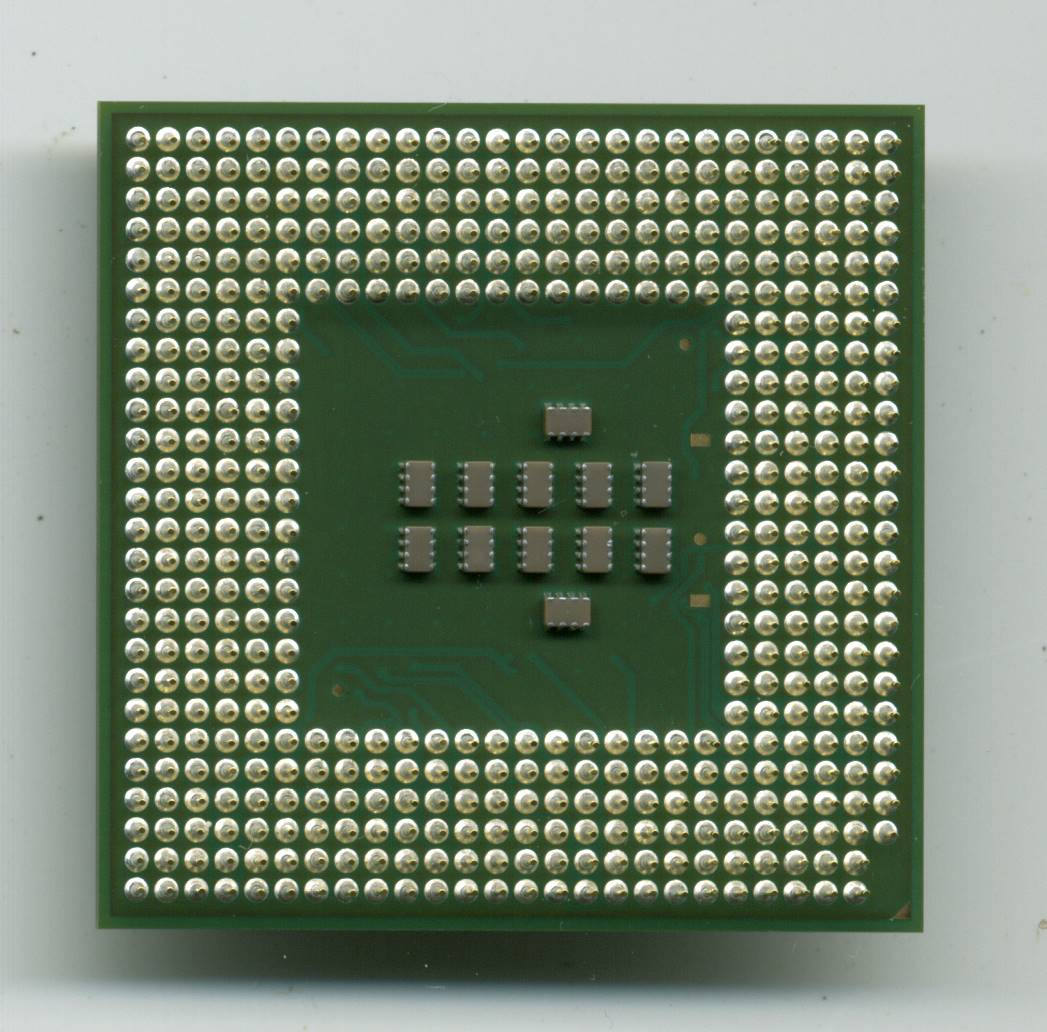
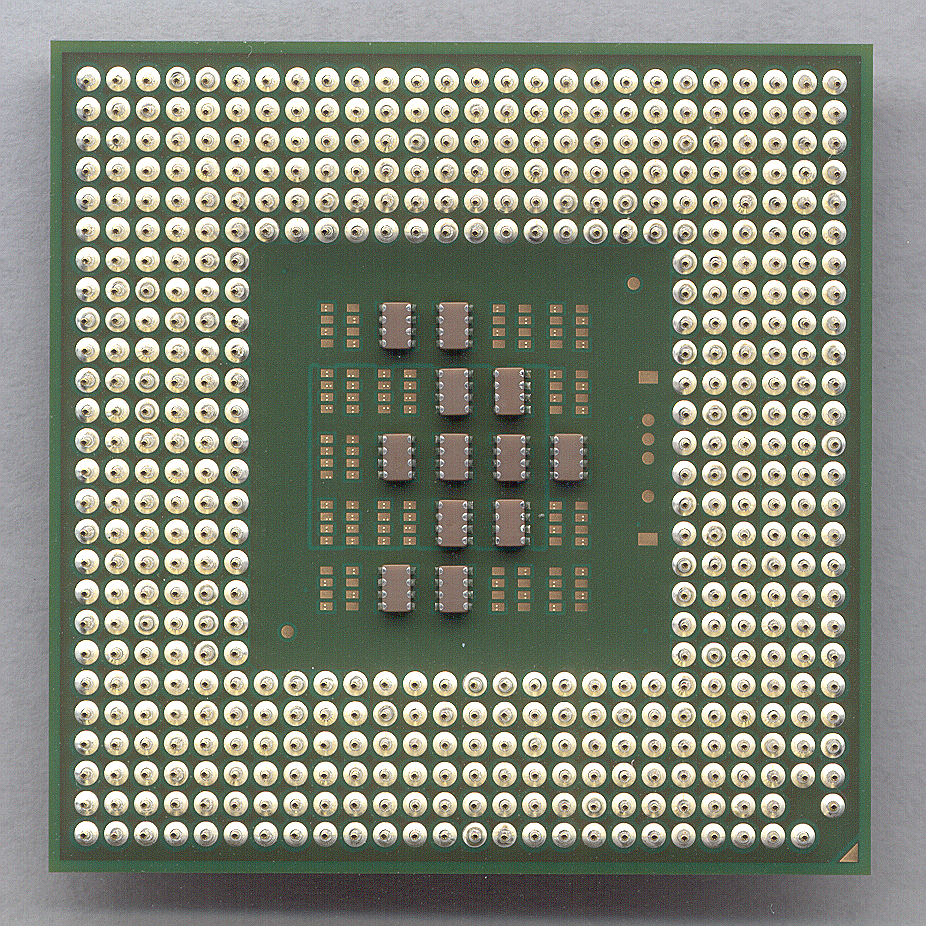
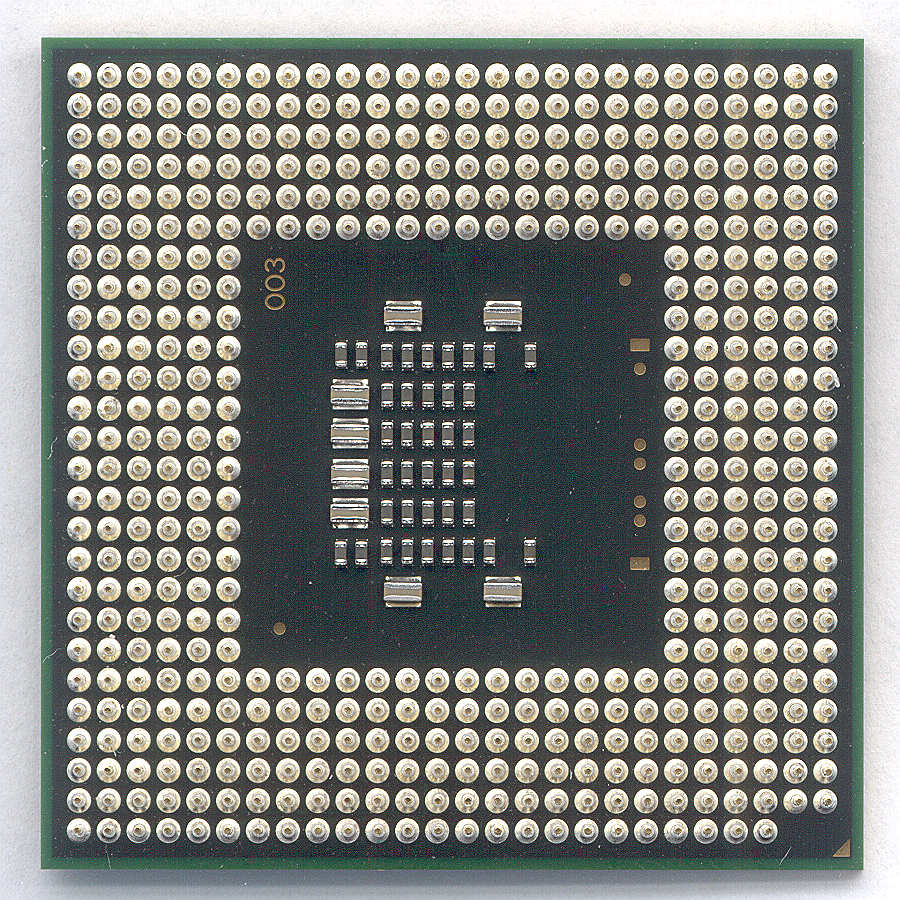
The undersides of various Socket 478/479 Intel CPUs. Note the differences in pin layouts for certain CPUs.
Clockwise from upper left: Pentium 4 Socket 478, Mobile Pentium III-M Socket 479, Core 2 Duo Socket P, and Pentium M Socket 479.
Note that Socket M uses the same pin arrangements as with Mobile Pentium III-M/Mobile Celeron Socket 479 CPUs.

There exist multiple electrically incompatible, but mechanically compatible processor families that are available in PGA packages using Socket 479 or variants thereof (listed in chronological order):

- Socket 479 for Pentium III-M and Mobile Celeron (released in 2001, also known as mPGA478A);
- Socket 478 for Pentium 4 and Celeron series desktop/mobile CPUs (also released in 2001, known as mPGA478B);
- Socket 479 for Pentium M and Celeron M 3xx (released in 2003; this was the most common version of the socket, and was known as mPGA478C);
- Socket M for Intel Core, Core 2 and Celeron M 4xx and 5xx processors (released in 2006, also known as mPGA478MT); and
- Socket P for Core 2 processors (released in 2007, also known as mPGA478MN).

Each of these above-mentioned processor families have CPU packages that are mechanically similar yet not electrically compatible with each other, and therefore accidentally inserting them into the wrong socket configurations will not work and/or may result in damage to the processor or the motherboard. Even Intel's CPU specifications seem to be not clear enough on the distinction and instead use the package/socket designations PGA478 or PPGA478 for more than 1 of the above sockets.

Some of these aforementioned processor families listed above also used different pin arrangements on the processor itself, meaning that Pentium M/Celeron M Socket 479 processors will not fit in a Mobile Pentium III-M/Mobile Celeron Socket 479 socket, both versions of Socket 478 (mPGA478A and mPGA478B), and Socket M and Socket P, despite being mechanically (but not electrically) similar and having a similar number of pins.

Perhaps adding yet more confusion, some of the PGA-based CPUs above are also available in a BGA (or more precisely, μBGA or even μFCBGA) package which has all of the 479 contacts (balls) populated. For these CPU variants, the Intel's CPU specifications use the designations BGA479, PBGA479 or H-PBGA479. It should be however pointed out that these designations denote rather the CPU package itself and not the socket, which the BGA variants do not use at all (they are intended to be directly soldered to the mainboard, e.g. in an embedded system). The non-BGA counterparts of these CPUs use any one of the above-mentioned sockets, not just the Socket 479.

== See also ==
- List of Intel microprocessors
- List of Intel Pentium M microprocessors
- List of Intel Celeron microprocessors
