= LGA 775 =

Intel desktop CPU socket

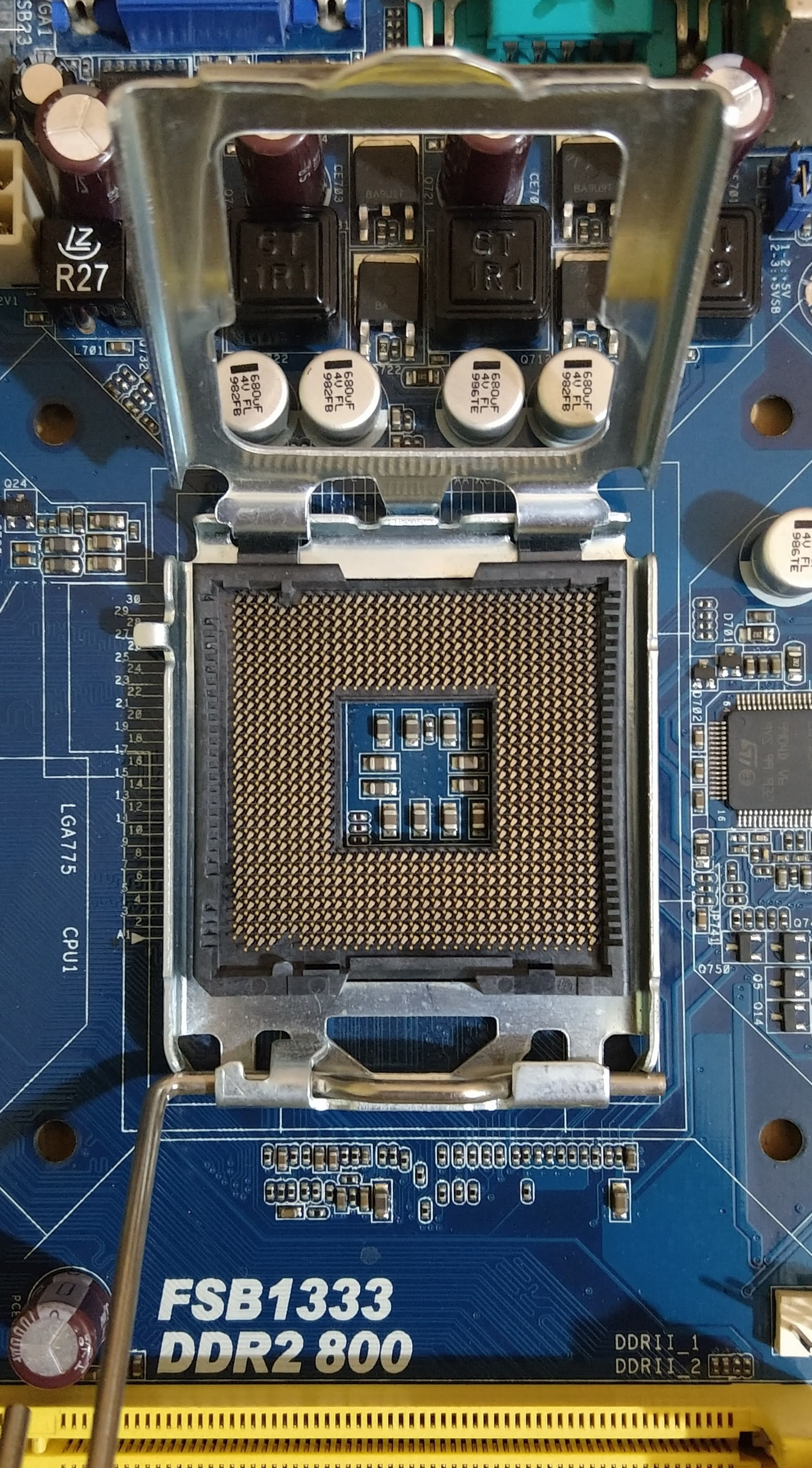
- Release date: 2004 (22 years ago)
- Designed by: Intel
- Manufactured by: Intel
- Type: Land grid array-Zero insertion force (LGA-ZIF)
- Chip form factors: Flip-chip land grid array (FCLGA)
- Contacts: 775
- FSB protocol: AGTL+
- FSB frequency: 133 MHz (533 MT/s); 200 MHz (800 MT/s); 266 MHz (1066 MT/s); 333 MHz (1333 MT/s); 400 MHz (1600 MT/s)
- Voltage range: 1.2 V - 1.5 V
- Processor dimensions: 37.5 × 37.5 mm 1,406.25 mm²
- Processors: Intel Pentium 4 (2.66–3.80 GHz); Intel Celeron D (2.53–3.60 GHz); Intel Pentium 4 Extreme Edition (3.40–3.73 GHz); Intel Pentium D (2.66–3.60 GHz); Pentium Extreme Edition (3.20–3.73 GHz); Pentium Dual-Core (1.40–3.33 GHz); Intel Core 2 Duo (1.60–3.33 GHz); Intel Core 2 Quad (2.33–3.00 GHz); Intel Core 2 Extreme (2.66–3.20 GHz); Intel Xeon (1.86–3.40 GHz); Intel Celeron (1.60–2.40 GHz)
- Predecessor: Socket 478
- Variant: LGA 771 (Socket J)
- Successor: LGA 1156 (desktops and low-end servers); LGA 1366 (high-end desktops and some low-end to mid-end servers)
- Memory support: DDR (also known as DDR1); DDR2; DDR3
- This article is part of the CPU socket series

LGA 775 (land grid array 775), also known as Socket T, is an Intel desktop CPU socket. Unlike PGA CPU sockets, such as its predecessor Socket 478, LGA 775 has no socket holes; instead, it has 775 protruding pins that touch contact points on the underside of the processor (CPU). It is the last Intel socket that supports the front-side bus interface (FSB).

Intel started selling LGA 775 (Socket T) CPUs with the 64-bit version of their 90 nm "Prescott"-based Pentium 4 HT.

The socket had an unusually long life span, lasting 7 years until the last processors supporting it ceased production in 2011. The socket was superseded by the LGA 1156 (Socket H) and LGA 1366 (Socket B) sockets.

== LGA 775 processors ==
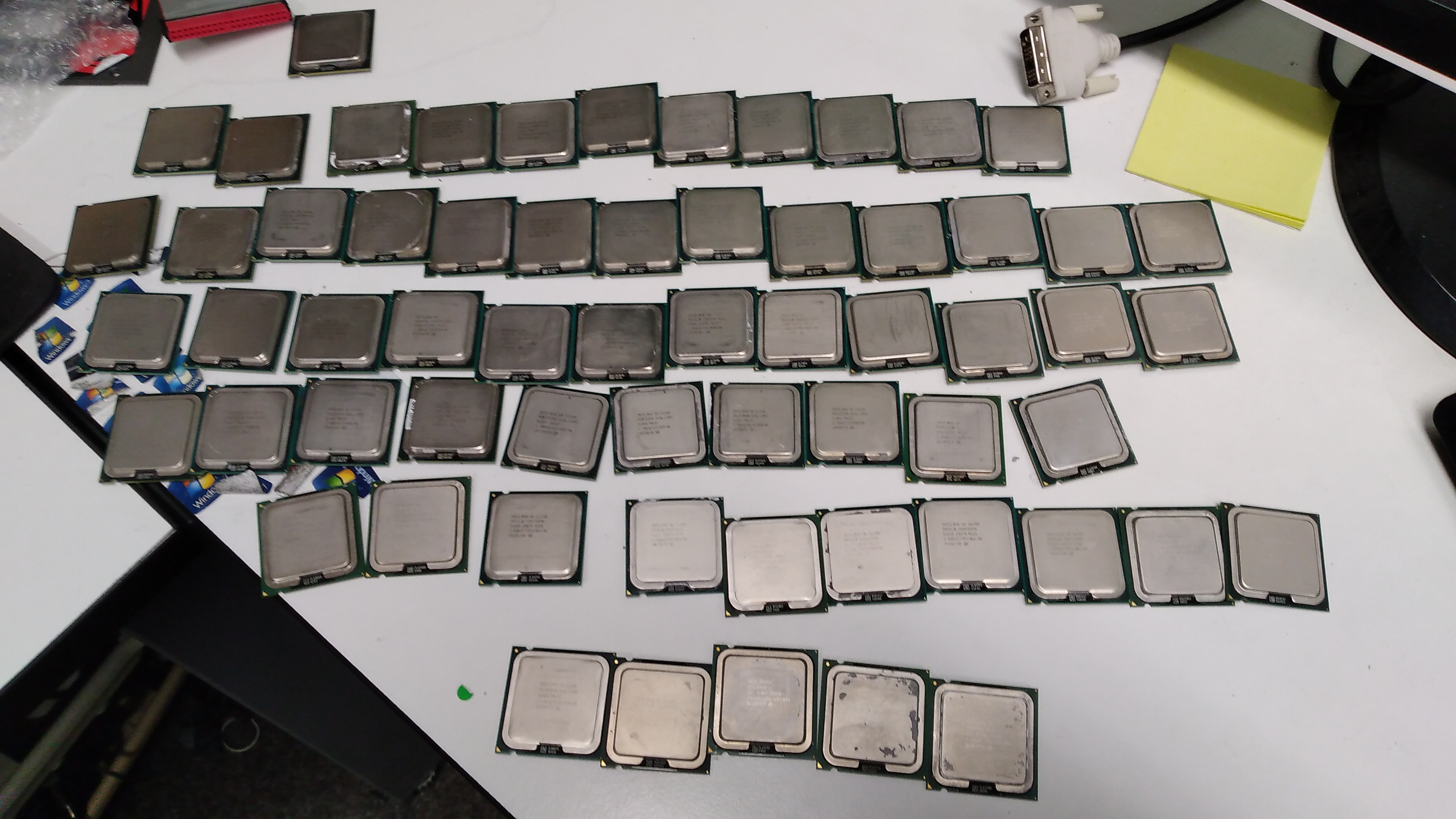
A selection of LGA 775 CPUs

(Note: Some of the processors listed here might not work on newer Intel based chipsets; see "LGA 775 compatibility" below.)

- Pentium 4
- Pentium 4 Extreme Edition
- Pentium D
- Celeron/Celeron D
- Pentium Dual-Core
- Pentium Extreme Edition
- Core 2 Duo/Core 2 Quad
- Core 2 Extreme

== Heatsink design ==
For LGA 775, the distance between the screw-holes for the heatsink is 72 mm. Such heat-sinks are not interchangeable with heatsinks for sockets that have a distance of 75 mm, such as LGA 1156, LGA 1155, LGA 1150, LGA 1151 and LGA 1200.

== Chipsets ==
LGA 775 was the last Intel socket for desktops for which third-party companies manufactured chipsets. Nvidia was the last third-party manufacturer of LGA 775 chipsets (its final product was MCP7A family, marketed as GeForce 9300/9400, launched in October 2008), as other third-parties discontinued their products earlier. All chipsets for superseding sockets were exclusively designed and manufactured by Intel, a practice later also adopted by AMD when they first launched APUs in 2011 (Socket AM3+ processors, also launched in 2011, were usually paired with motherboard with AMD chipsets, but some motherboards using third-party chipsets were also manufactured, usually with Nvidia chipsets, as the Socket AM3+ design was directly extended from the earlier Socket AM3 design).

=== Intel ===
==== Core 2 Chipsets ====
- Lakeport: 945PL / 945P / 945G / 945GC / 945GZ / 955X / 946PL / 946GZ P
- Broadwater: i955X / i946 / 946GZ / PL / 965 / i975 / Q965 / P965 / G965 / Q963 / i975X
- Bearlake: X35 / P35 / Q35 / G35 / P33 / G33 / Q33 / P31 / G31 / X38 / X48
- Eaglelake: P45 / P43 / G45 / G43 / G41 / B43 / Q43 / Q45
  945PLS3

=== SiS ===
- SiS 649
- 649FX
- 655
- 656
- 656FX
- 662
- 671
- 671FX
- 671DX
- 672

=== VIA ===
- PT800
- PM800
- PT880
- PM880
- P4M800
- P4M800 Pro
- PT880 Pro
  - Supports both AGP and PCI-Express at the same time, but only one port can be used at a time. A similar design can also be found in some Socket 939 boards.
- PT880 Ultra
- PT894
- PT894 Pro
- P4M890
- PT890
- P4M900

=== ATI ===
- ATI Radeon Xpress 200
- ATI Radeon Xpress 1250
- ATI CrossFire Xpress 3200

=== Nvidia ===
- nForce4 Ultra
- nForce4 SLI XE
- nForce4 SLI;
- nForce4 SLI X16
- nForce 570 SLI
- nForce 590 SLI
- nForce 610i
- nForce 620i
- nForce 630i
- nForce 650i Ultra
- nForce 650i SLI
- nForce 680i LT SLI
- nForce 680i SLI
- nForce 730i
- nForce 740i SLI
- nForce 750i SLI
- nForce 760i SLI
- nForce 780i SLI
- nForce 790i SLI
- GeForce 9300
- GeForce 9400

== Improvements in heat dissipation ==
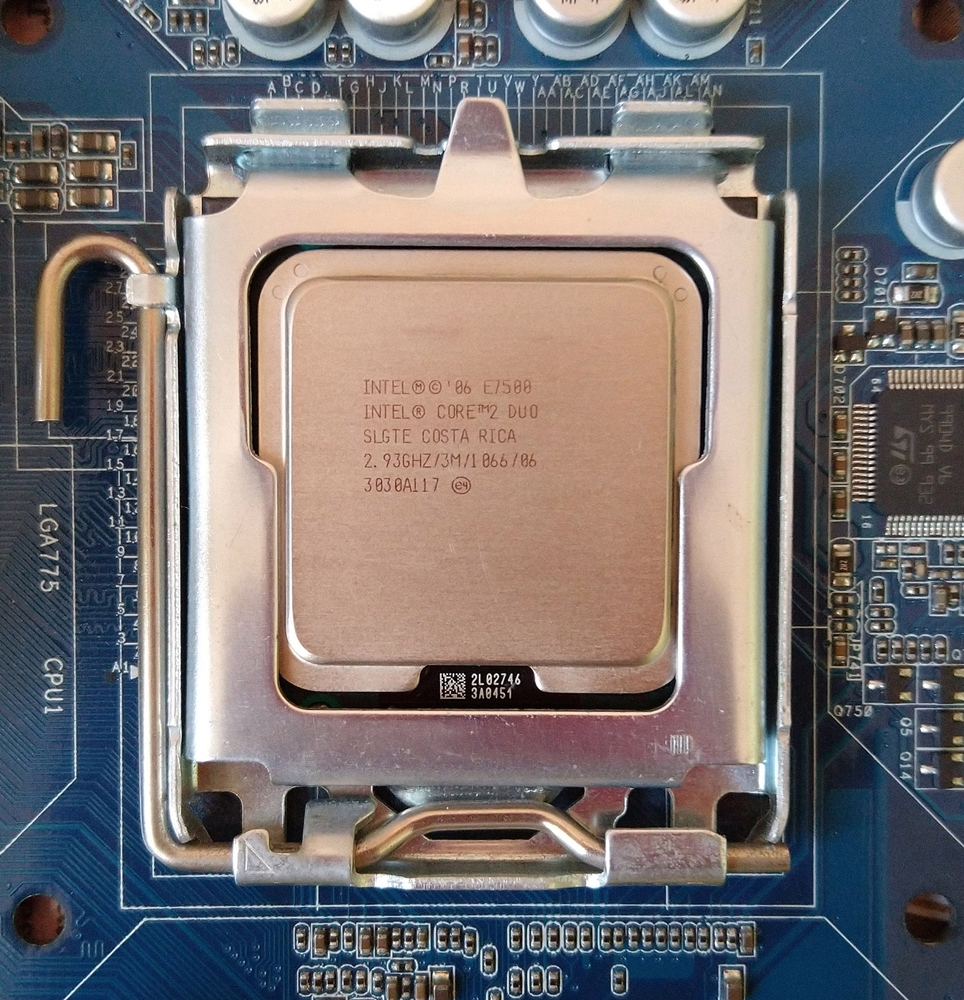
Intel Core 2 Duo E7500 2.93 GHz installed into LGA 775 socket

The force from the load plate ensures that the processor is completely level, giving the CPU's upper surface optimal contact with the heat sink or cold-water block fixed onto the top of the CPU to carry away the heat generated by the CPU. This socket also introduces a new method of connecting the heat dissipation interface to the chip surface and motherboard. With LGA 775, the heat dissipation interface is connected directly to the motherboard on four points, compared with the two connections of Socket 370 and the "clamshell" four-point connection of Socket 478. This was done to avoid the reputed danger of the heat sinks/fans of pre-built computers falling off in transit. LGA 775 was announced to have better heat dissipation properties than the Socket 478 it was designed to replace, but the Prescott core CPUs (in their early incarnations) ran much hotter than the previous Northwood-core Pentium 4 CPUs, and this initially neutralized the benefits of better heat transfer. Nonetheless, the later Core 2 processors run at much lower temperatures than the Prescott CPUs they replaced.

Processors with lower TDP and clock speeds only used Thermal Interface Compound in between the die and the integrated heat spreader (IHS), while processors with higher TDP and clock speeds have the die soldered directly to the IHS, allowing for better heat transfer between the CPU and the integrated heat spreader.

== LGA 775 mechanical load limits ==
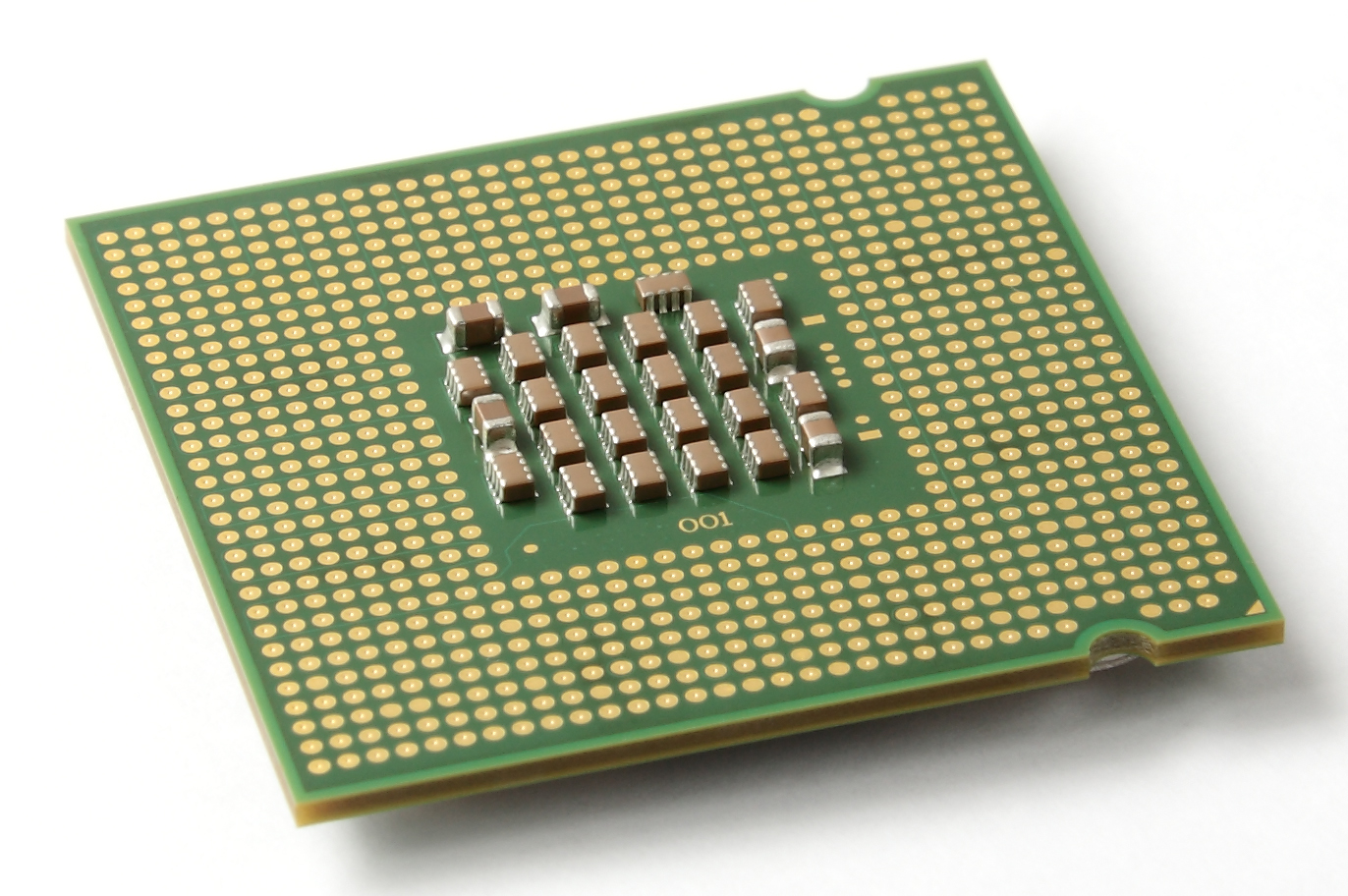
The LGA 775 contact points on the underside of a Pentium 4 Prescott CPU

All LGA 775 processors have the following mechanical maximum load limits that should not be exceeded during heat sink assembly, shipping conditions, or standard use. Load above those limits could crack the processor die and make it unusable. The limits are included in the table below.

Location	Dynamic	Static
IHS Surface	756 N (170 lb_{f}) (77 kp)	311 N (70 lb_{f}) (31 kp)

The transition to the LGA packaging has lowered those load limits, which are smaller than the load limits of Socket 478 processors but they are bigger than Socket 370, Socket 423 and Socket A processors, which were fragile. They are large enough to ensure that processors will not crack.

== LGA 775 compatibility ==
Compatibility is quite variable, as earlier chipsets (Intel 915 and below) tend to support only single core NetBurst Pentium 4 and Celeron CPUs at an FSB of 533/800 MT/s.

Intermediate chipsets (e.g. Intel 945) commonly support both single core Pentium 4-based CPUs as well as dual core Pentium D processors. Some motherboards using the 945 chipset could be given a BIOS upgrade to support 65nm Core-based processors. Other chipsets have varying levels of CPU support, generally following the release of contemporary CPUs, as LGA 775 CPU support is a complicated mixture of chipset capability, voltage regulator limitations and BIOS support. For example, the newer Q45 chipset does not support NetBurst-based CPUs such as the Pentium 4, Pentium D, Pentium Extreme Edition, and Celeron D.

== Virtualization capabilities ==
Some Core 2 and other LGA 775 processors are capable of hardware-accelerated virtualization. More recent hypervisors might not be compatible with these CPUs because they lack support for Extended Page Tables.

== See also ==
- List of Intel processors
- List of Intel Pentium 4 processors
- List of Intel Core 2 processors
- List of Intel Xeon processors
