= Socket 478 =

Processor socket made by Intel

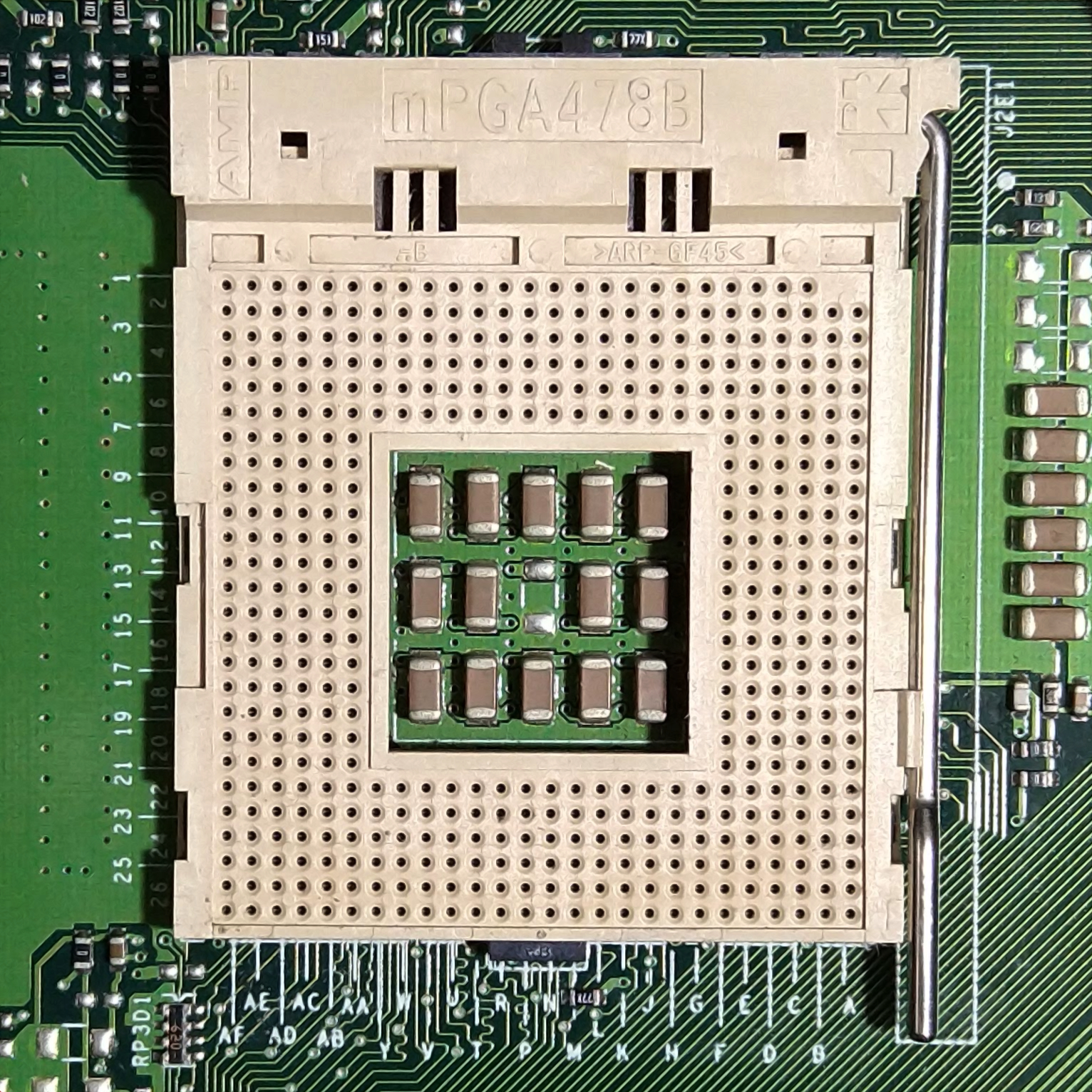
- Release date: 2001
- Designed by: Intel
- Type: PGA-ZIF
- Chip form factors: Flip-chip pin grid array (FC-PGA2 or FC-PGA4)
- Contacts: 478 (not to be confused with the newer Socket P or the similar Socket 479 and Socket M)
- FSB protocol: AGTL+
- FSB frequency: 400 MT/s; 533 MT/s; 800 MT/s
- Voltage range: 1.25 V - 1.525 V
- Processor dimensions: 35 mm × 35 mm
- Processors: Pentium 4 (1.4–3.4 GHz); Celeron (1.7–2.8 GHz); Celeron D (2.13–3.2 GHz); Pentium 4 Extreme Edition (3.2–3.4 GHz)
- Predecessor: Socket 423
- Successor: LGA 775
- This article is part of the CPU socket series

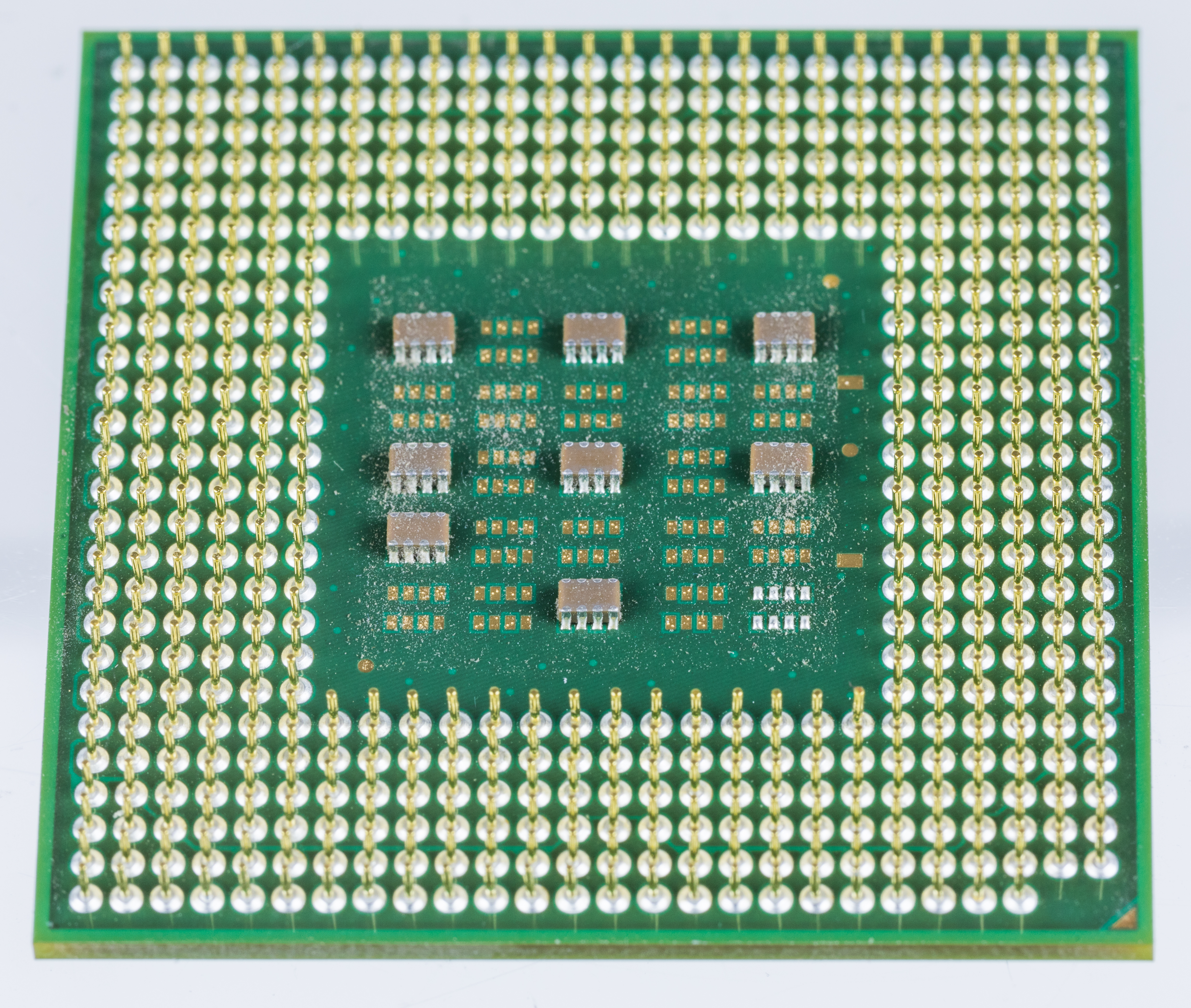
Pentium 4 Willamette with Socket 478 (2001), pin side

Socket 478, also known as mPGA478 or mPGA478B, is a 478-contact CPU socket used for Intel's Pentium 4 and Celeron series CPUs.

Socket 478 was launched in August 2001 in advance of the Northwood core to compete with AMD's 462-pin Socket A and their Athlon XP processors. Socket 478 was intended to be the replacement for Socket 423, a Willamette-based processor socket which was on the market for only a short time.

This was the last Intel desktop socket to use a pin grid array (PGA) interface. All later Intel desktop sockets use a land grid array (LGA) interface.

Socket 478 was phased out with the launch of LGA 775 in 2004.

== Technical specifications ==
Socket 478 was used for all Northwood Pentium 4 and Celeron processors. It supported the first Prescott Pentium 4 processors and all Willamette Celerons, along with several of the Willamette-series Pentium 4s. Socket 478 also supported the newer Prescott-based Celeron D processors (which were also one of the last CPUs made for the socket), and early Pentium 4 Extreme Edition processors with 2 MB of L3 CPU cache.

While Intel's mobile CPUs are available in 478-pin packages, they in fact only operate in a range of slightly differing sockets such as Socket 479 (both mPGA478A and mPGA478C/mPGA479M/μFCPGA/μPGA479M), Socket M, and Socket P, all of which are electrically (and sometimes pin) incompatible with each other including Socket 478.

Socket 478 is used in combination with DDR SDRAM, as well as SDR SDRAM, RDRAM and DDR2 SDRAM.

== Heatsink ==
The 4 holes for fastening the heatsink to the motherboard are placed in a rectangle with lateral lengths of 60 mm and 75 mm.

== Mechanical load limits ==
All sockets (Pentium 4 and Celeron) have the following mechanical maximum load limits which should not be exceeded during heatsink assembly, shipping conditions, or standard use. Load above those limits may crack the processor die and make it unusable. The limits are included in the table below.

Location	Dynamic	Static	Transient
IHS Surface	890 N (200 lb_{f})	445 N (100 lb_{f})	667 N (150 lb_{f})

== See also ==
- List of Intel microprocessors
