= Socket 423 =

423 pin CPU socket

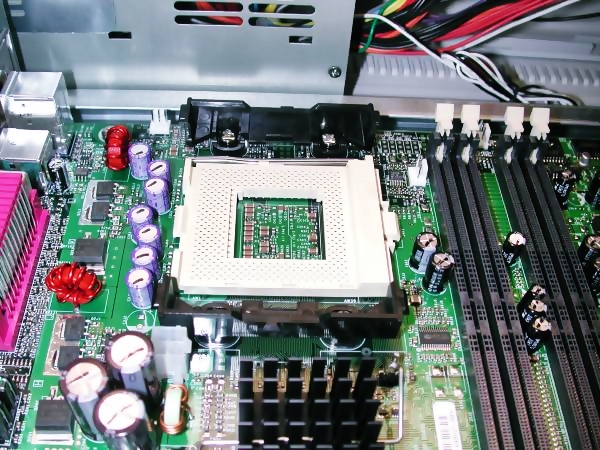
- Release date: 2000
- Designed by: Intel
- Type: PGA-ZIF
- Chip form factors: Organic Land Grid Array (OLGA) on Interposer (OOI) (INT2 and INT3)
- Contacts: 423
- FSB protocol: AGTL+
- FSB frequency: 400 MT/s
- Voltage range: 1.0–1.85 V
- Processor dimensions: 2.1 × 2.1 inches
- Processors: Intel Pentium 4 (1.3–2.0 GHz)
- Predecessor: Socket 370
- Successor: Socket 478
- This article is part of the CPU socket series

Socket 423 is a 423-pin CPU socket used by Intel's first generation of Pentium 4 processors based on the Willamette core. It was replaced by the smaller, microPGA-based Socket 478 in 2001.

== Technical specifications ==
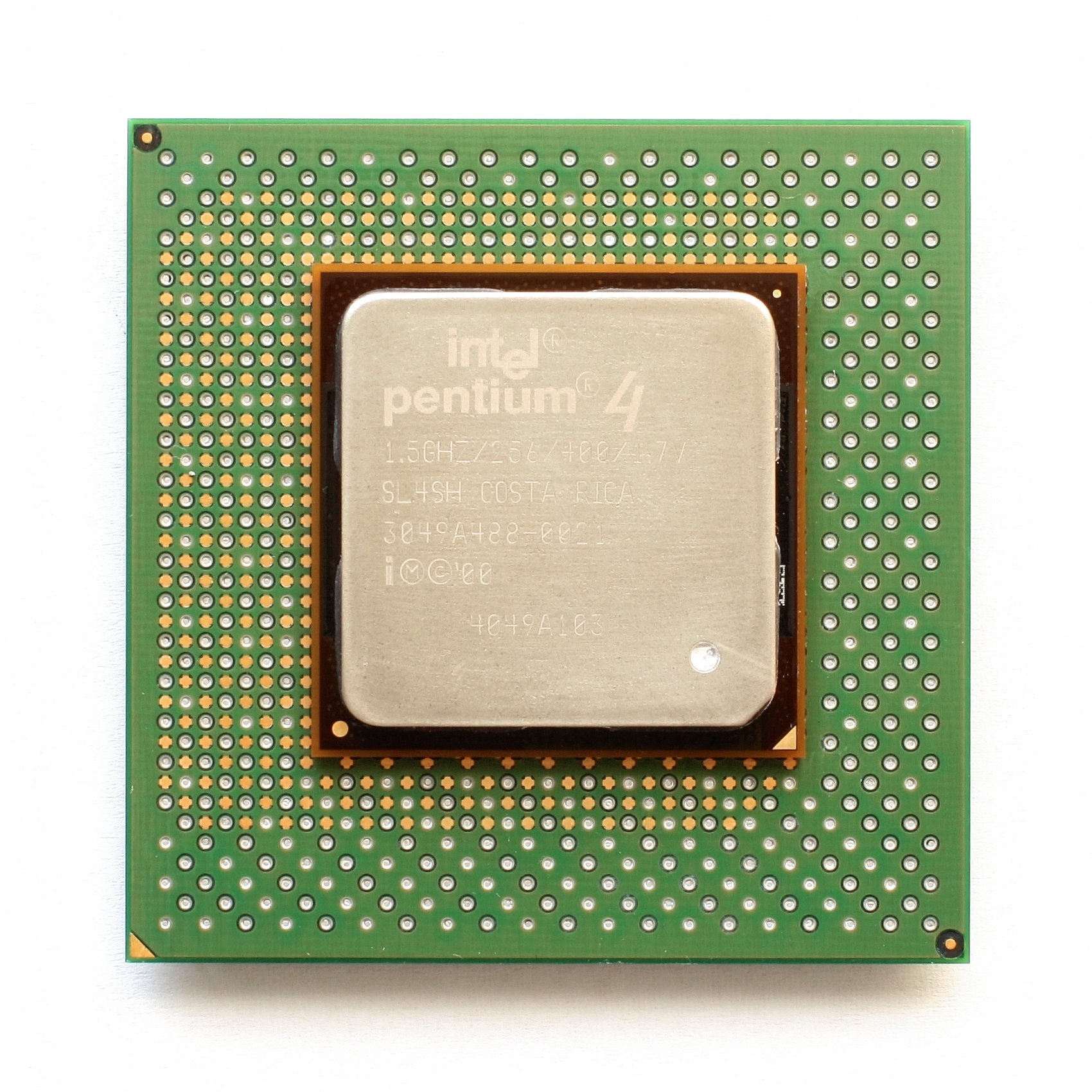
A Willamette-core Socket 423 Pentium 4, 1.5 GHz

Socket 423 was designed to house any processor in the Socket 423 package. This socket was short-lived, as it became apparent that its electrical design proved inadequate for raising clock speeds beyond 2.0 GHz. Intel only produced chips using this socket in less than a year, from November 2000 to August 2001, when it was replaced by Socket 478.

All processors using this socket have a locked multiplier, meaning that they are not overclockable unless the front side bus frequency is increased. Doing this, however could push other buses out of spec, causing erratic behaviors such as system instability and premature failure.

The "PowerLeap PL-P4/N" is a device developed in the form of a socket adapter that allows the use of Socket 478 processors in Socket 423 motherboards.

== Heatsink ==
The 4 holes for fastening the heatsink to the motherboard are placed in a rectangle with lateral lengths of 37 mm and 80 mm.

== See also ==
- List of Intel microprocessors
