= Socket 60x =

Socket 60x may refer to:

- Socket 603
- Socket 604
