= Dell Precision =

Line of computer workstations by Dell

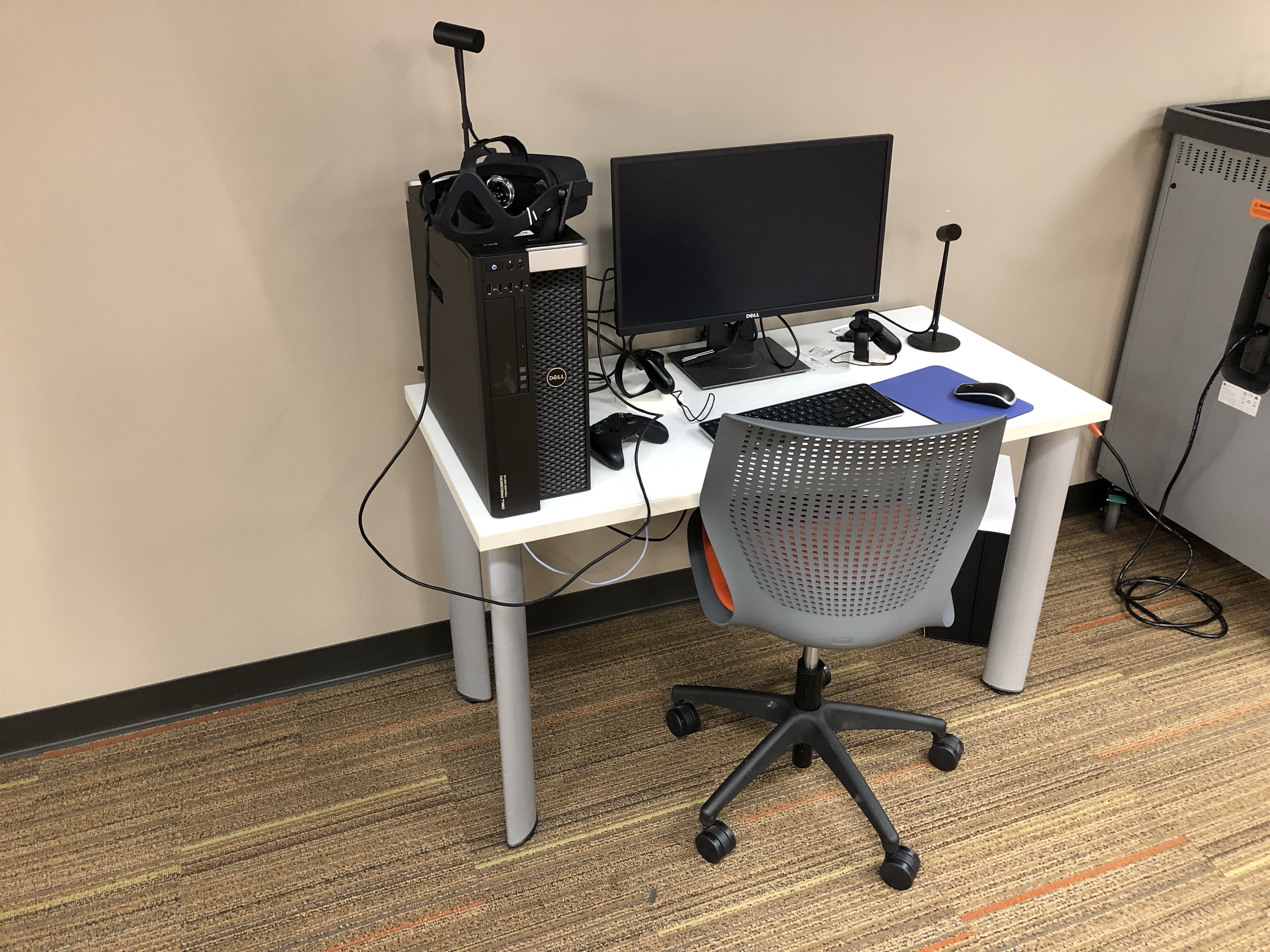
- Precision 5810
- Developer: Dell
- Type: Workstation
- Released: 1992 (pre-workstation); 1997/98 (workstations)
- Discontinued: 2025
- Operating system: Windows, Linux
- CPU: AMD, Intel
- Graphics: Nvidia, AMD
- Marketing target: Business
- Successor: Dell Pro Max (2025); Dell Pro Precision (2026–present)
- Related: OptiPlex, Latitude
- Website: Dell Precision

Dell Precision was a line of computer workstations for the likes of professional computer-aided design, architecture, and computer graphics work. They were available in both desktop (tower) and mobile (laptop) forms. Dell touted their Precision Mobile Workstations as "optimised for performance, reliability and user experience."

== History ==
Dell's use of the Precision brand name originated at least as early as 1992 with the Precision 386SX/16 and 386SX/25, though these early systems were not workstations. Dell released its very first workstation in 1997, named the Dell Workstation 400, which notably did not actually carry the Precision name. The Precision brand name was co-opted for use as a workstation line the following year, with the release of the 1998 Dell Precision Workstation 410. Interestingly however, Dell considered their first workstation a member of the Precision family when celebrating the 25 year anniversary of its release in 2022.

In January 2025 Dell announced a major restructuring that saw the demise of the Precision brand, along with others. However the Precision name returned the following year in the form of Dell Pro Precision. (Dell Precision is discontinued but still available used and New Old Stock)

== Desktop workstations ==
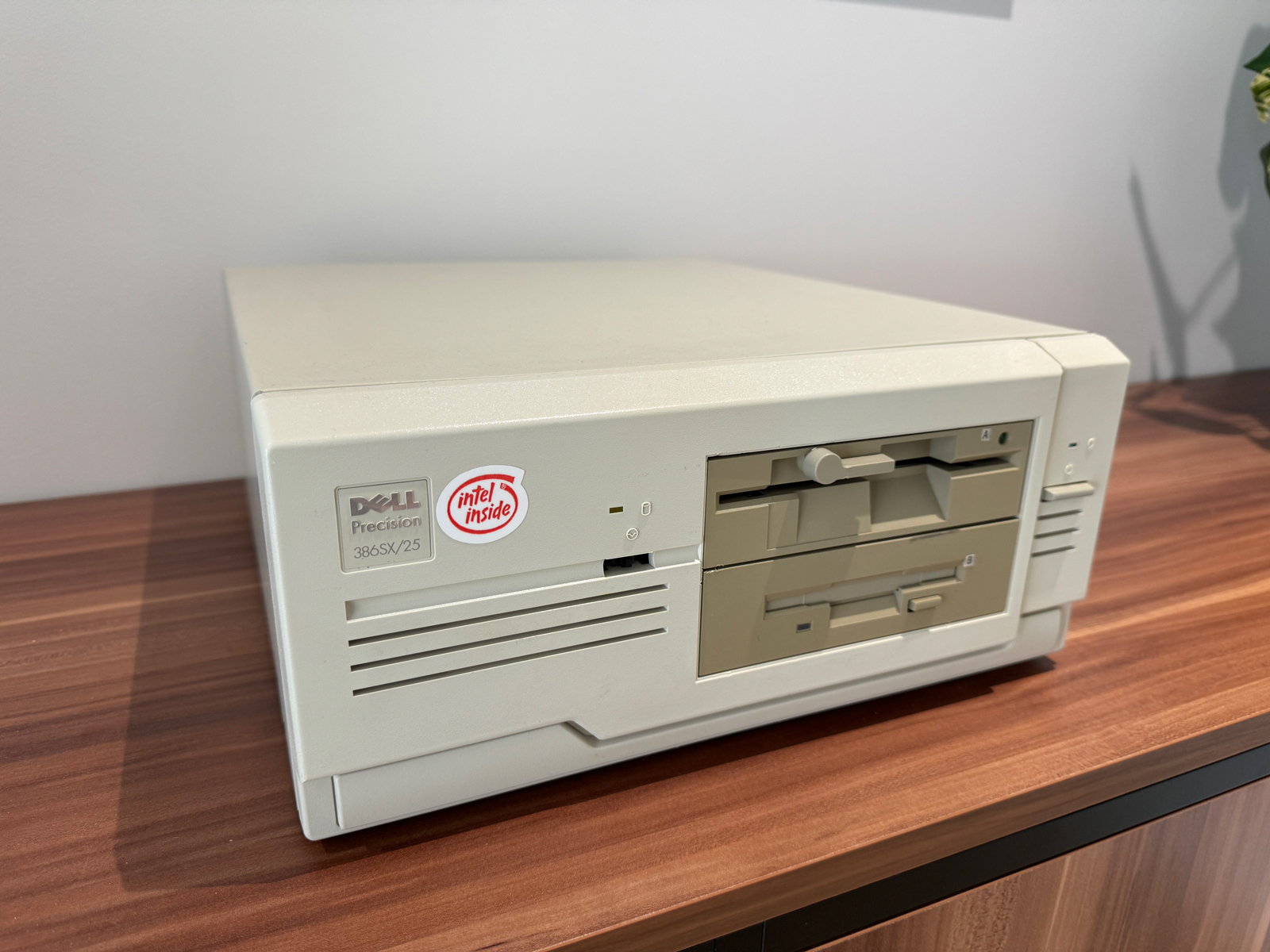
One of the first Dell Precision systems

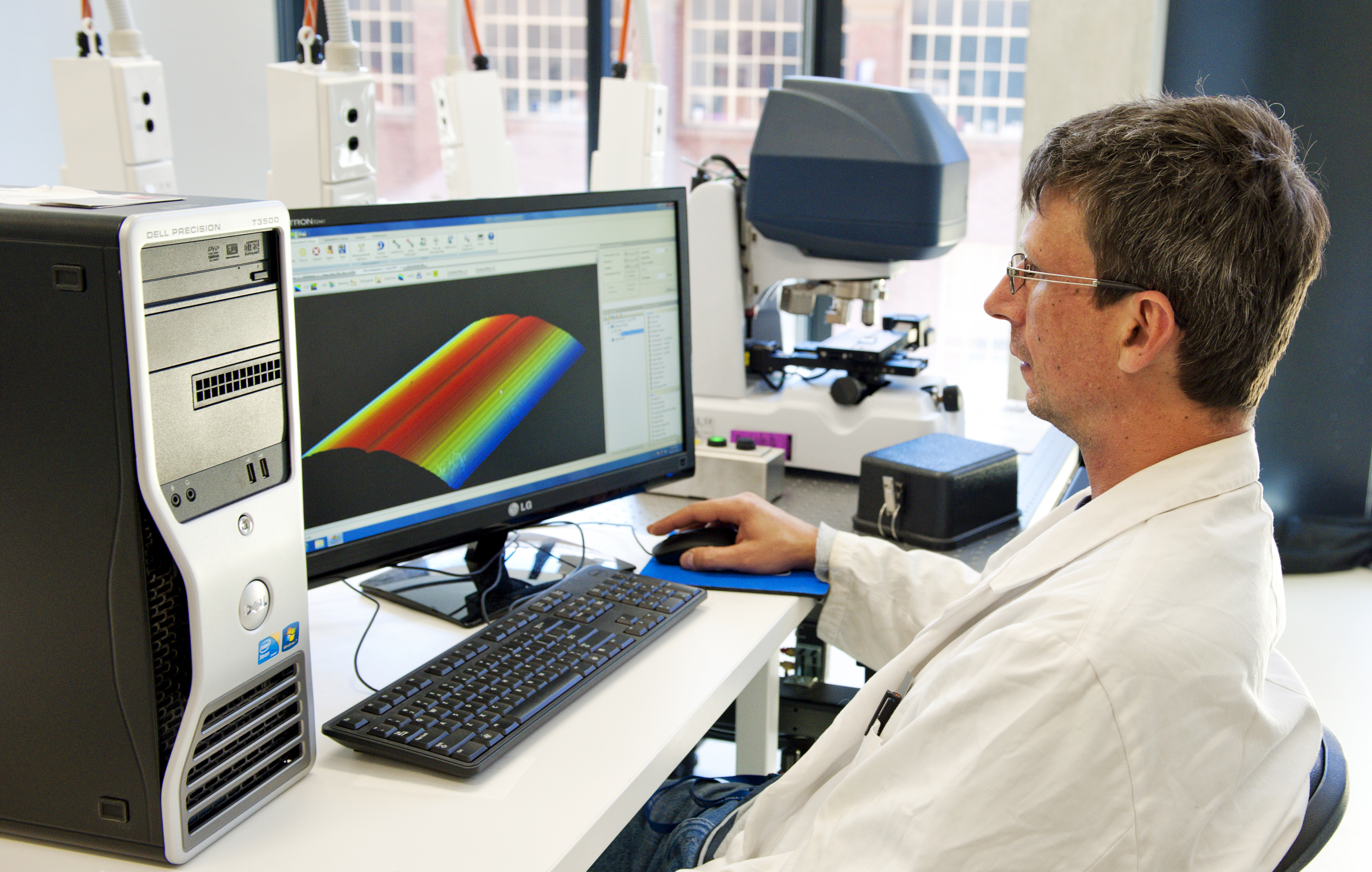
Dell Precision T3500 workstation with Xeon processor

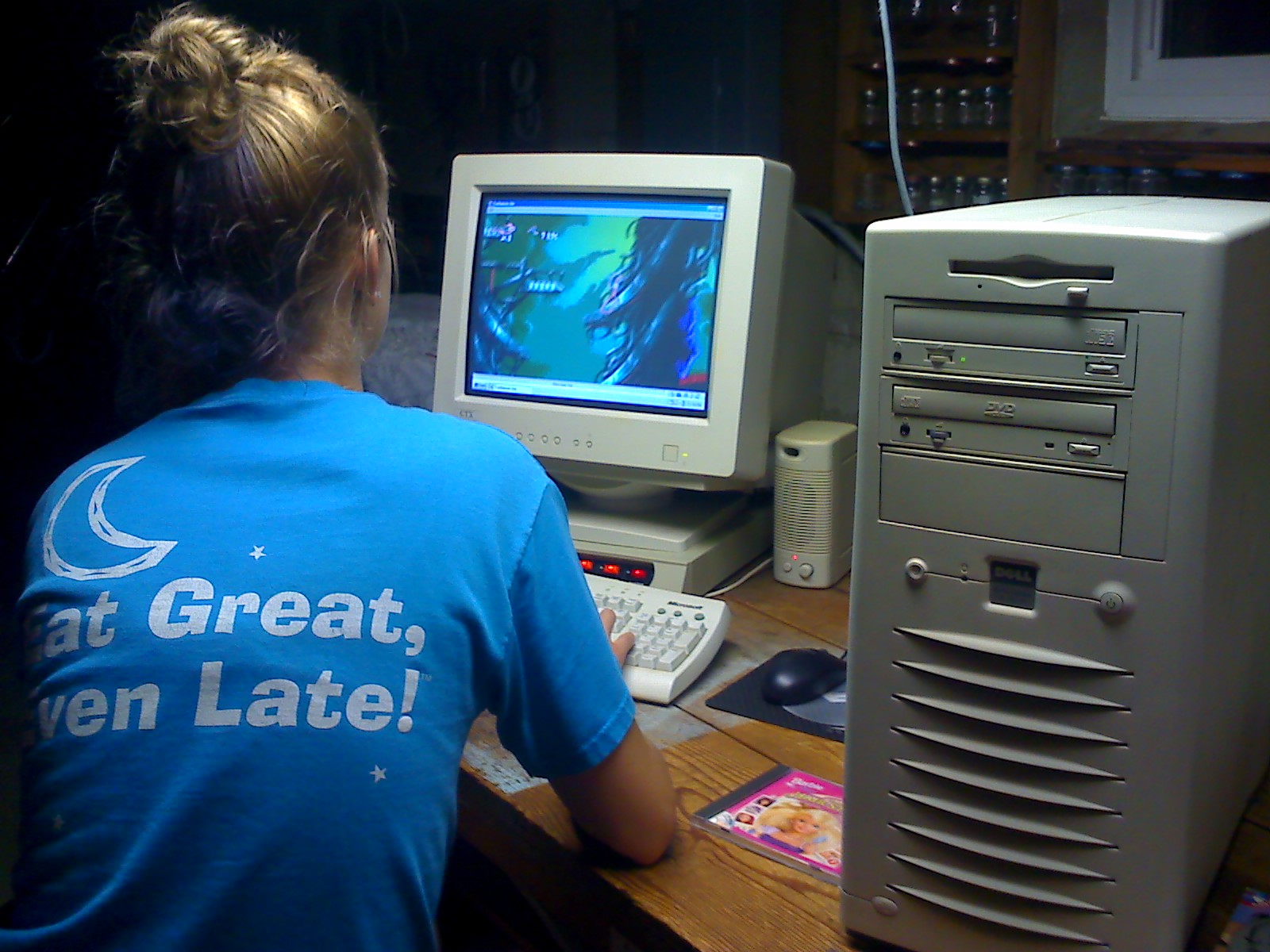
Dell Precision 620MT with dual Pentium III processors

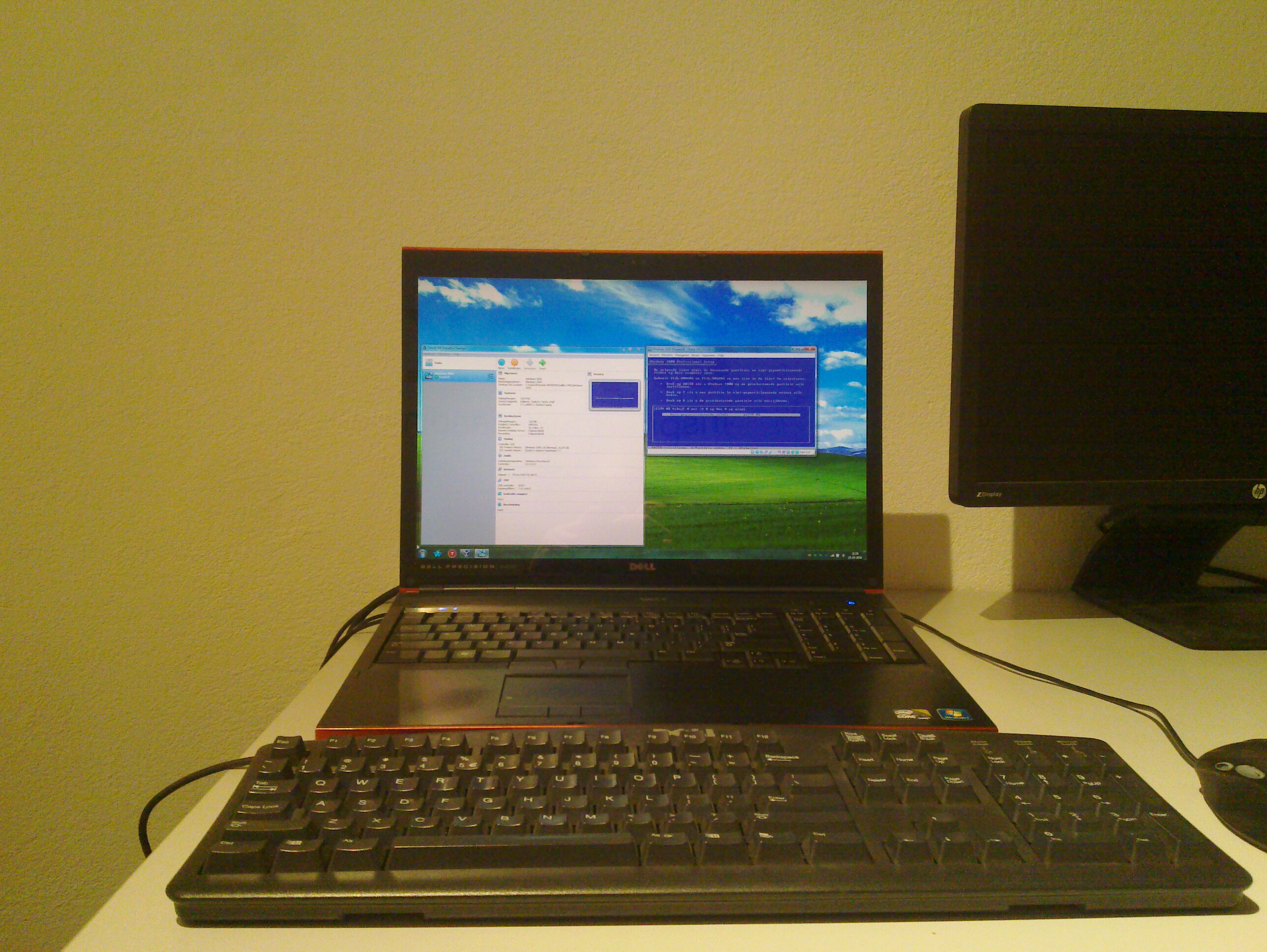
Dell Precision M6500 Covet with Core i7 Extreme Edition processor

=== Early systems ===
Model	Release	CPU Socket	CPU	FSB (MHz)	Chipset	Memory	Graphics
Precision 386SX/25	1992	PQFP-132	Intel 80386SX 25 MHz Optional Co-Processor	25	VLSI	2 banks, Fast Page SIMM, Max 16 MB	VGA
Precision 386DX/33	1992	PGA-132	Intel 80386DX 33 MHz Optional Co-Processor	33	VLSI	4 banks, Fast Page SIMM, Max 32 MB	VGA
Precision 433i	1993	Socket 1	Intel 80486DX2 66 MHz	33	OPTi	4 banks, Max 64 MB	VGA

=== Single processor ===
Model	Release	CPU Socket	CPU	FSB (MHz)	Chipset	Memory	Graphics
Precision 3680	2024	LGA 1700	14th gen Core i9, i7, i5, i3		Intel W680	DDR5 ECC or Non-ECC	1x PCIe x16 Gen5 1x PCIe x4 Gen4 1x PCIe x4 Gen3
Precision 7960	2023	LGA 4677	Xeon W5-35xx, W7-35xx or W9-35xx (Sapphire Rapids Refresh)	N/A	Intel W790	DDR5 ECC	2x PCIe x16 Gen5 2x PCIe x16 Gen4 2x PCIe x8 Gen4 2x PCIe x4 Gen4
Precision 7875	2023	sTR5	AMD Ryzen Threadripper Pro 79x5WX	N/A	AMD PROM21	DDR5 ECC	1x PCIe x16 Gen5 1x PCIe x16 Gen4
Precision 5860	2023	LGA 4677	Xeon W3-25xx, W5-25xx or W7-25xx (Sapphire Rapids Refresh)		Intel W790	DDR5 ECC	1x PCIe x16 Gen5 1x PCIe x16 Gen4 1x PCIe x8 Gen4 1x PCIe x4 Gen4
Precision 3660	2022	LGA 1700	13th gen Core i9, i7, i5, i3 12th gen Core i9, i7, i5, i3		Intel W680	DDR5 ECC or Non-ECC	1x PCIe x16 Gen5, up to 350 W 1x PCIe x4 Gen4 1x PCIe x4 Gen3
Precision 3650	2021	LGA 1200	11th gen Core i9, i7, i5 10th gen Core i3 Xeon W Family (W-1390, W-1370, W-1350)		Intel W580	DDR4 ECC or Non-ECC	1x PCIe x16 Gen4, up to 350 W 1x PCIe x4 Gen3 1x PCI-32
Precision 3640	2020	LGA 1200	10th gen Core i9, i7, i5, i3 Xeon W Family (W-1290, W-1270, W-1250)		Intel W480	DDR4 ECC or Non-ECC	1x PCIe x16 Gen 3, up to 300 W 1x PCIe x4 1x PCI-32
Precision 3630	2018	LGA 1151	9th gen Core i9(K), i7(K) 8th gen Core i7, i5 and i3 Xeon E Family (Coffee Lake)		Intel C246	DDR4 ECC or Non-ECC	1x PCIe x16 Gen 3, up to 265 W 2x PCIe x4
Precision 3430	2018	LGA 1151	8th gen Core i7, i5 and i3 Xeon E Family (Coffee Lake)			DDR4	1x PCIe x16 1x PCIe x4
Precision 5820	2017	LGA 2066	Xeon W Family (Skylake-W)	N/A	Intel C422	DDR4 ECC	2x PCIe x16 Gen 3, up to 600 W
Precision T3620	2016	LGA 1151	7th gen Core i7, i5, 6th gen Core i7, i5 and i3; Xeon E3-1200 v5		Intel C236	DDR4 ECC or Non-ECC	1x PCIe x16 Gen 3, up to 150 W
Precision T3420	2016	LGA 1151	7th gen Core i7, i5, 6th gen Core i7, i5 and i3; Xeon E3-1200 v5		Intel C236	DDR4 ECC or Non-ECC	1x PCIe x16 Gen 3, up to 50 W
Precision T5810	2014	LGA 2011-3	Xeon E5-1600 v3, select Xeon E5-2600 v3	QPI (optional)	Intel C612	DDR4 ECC	2x PCIe x16 Gen 3, up to 300 W
Precision T3610	2013	LGA 2011	Xeon E5-1600 v2 or E5-2600 v2 series	QPI	Intel C602	DDR3 ECC or Non-ECC	2x PCIe x16 Gen 3, up to 300 W
Precision T3600	2012	LGA 2011	Xeon E5-1600 or E5-2600 series	5.0 to 8.0 GT/s QPI	Intel C600	DDR3 ECC or Non-ECC	2x PCIe x16 Gen 3, up to 300 W
Precision T3500	2009	LGA 1366	Xeon 3500, 5500 or 5600 series	4.8 or 6.4 GT/s QPI	Intel X58	DDR3 ECC or Non-ECC	2 × PCIe x16 Gen 2, up to 150 W
Precision T3400	2007	LGA 775	Core 2 (Duo or Quad or Extreme)	1066 or 1333	Intel X38	DDR2 ECC or Non-ECC	2 × PCIe x16 Gen 2, up to 300 W
Precision T1700	2013	LGA 1150/Socket H3	Xeon E3-1200 v3, 4th gen Core i7 and i5		Intel C226	DDR3 ECC or Non-ECC	1x PCIe x16 Gen 3 up to 150 W (SFF model: low-profile card up to 50 W)
Precision T1650	2012	LGA 1155/Socket H2	Xeon E3-1200 v2, 3rd gen Core i5 and i7, or 2nd generation Core i3		Intel C216	DDR3 ECC or Non-ECC	1x PCIe x16 Gen 3 up to 75 W
Precision T1600	2011	LGA 1155/Socket H2	Xeon E3-1200 2nd gen Core i5 and i7		Intel C206	DDR3 ECC or Non-ECC	2x PCIe x16 Gen 2 up to 75 W
Precision T1500	2009	LGA 1156/Socket H1	1st gen Core i7, i5, and i3		Intel H57	DDR3 Non-ECC	1x PCIe x16 Gen 2 up to 75 W
Precision 390	2006	LGA 775	Core 2 (Duo or Quad or Extreme)	800 or 1066	Intel 975	DDR2 ECC	PCIe
Precision 380	2005	LGA 775	Pentium 4 or Pentium D or Pentium 4 Extreme Edition	800 or 1066	Intel 955	DDR2 ECC	PCIe
Precision 370	2004	LGA 775	Pentium 4	800	Intel 925	DDR2 400 Non-ECC or 533 ECC	PCIe
Precision 360	2003	Socket 478	Pentium 4	800	Intel 875	DDR333 or DDR400 ECC	AGP 8X
Precision 350	2002	Socket 478	Pentium 4	400 or 533	Intel 850E	Rambus PC800 & PC1066	AGP 4X
Precision 340	2002	Socket 478	Pentium 4	400 or 533	Intel 850E	Rambus PC800	AGP 4X
Precision 330	2001	Socket 423	Pentium 4	400	Intel 850	Rambus PC600 & PC800	AGP Pro

=== Single processor, All-In-One form factor ===
Model	Release	CPU	Chipset	Memory	Graphics	Screen
Precision 5720	2017	7th gen Core i7, i5, 6th gen Core i7, i5 and i3; Xeon E3-1200 v5 or E3-1200 v6	Intel C236	DDR4 ECC or Non-ECC (4 slots)	AMD Radeon Pro WX 7100 (8 GB GDDR5) or Radeon Pro WX 4150 (4 GB GDDR5)	27" 3840×2160 IPS

=== Dual processor, desktop form factor ===
Model	Release	CPU	FSB (MHz)	Chipset	Memory	Port Bus
Precision 490 (Note: Also available as a mini-tower)	2006	Xeon Dual-Core 5100 or Quad-Core 5300 Series 64-bit (Note: The Precision 490 shipped with 3 different motherboards: part numbers DT031, F9382, and GU083. All three motherboard revisions are capable of running Dual-Core 5100 Series Xeon processors, but not all support the 5300 series Quad-Core Xeons. Evidence suggests that some GU083 motherboards support Quad-Core.)	1066 or 1333	Intel 5000x	DDR2 ECC FB-DIMM (Quad Channel)	2 × PCIe x16
Precision 470	2005	Xeon Single or Dual-core 64-bit	800	Intel E7525	DDR2	PCIe
Precision 450	2003	Xeon	533	Intel E7505	DDR, 3 mega flex max 8 GB ECC unbuf	AGP Pro
Precision 210	1998	Dual Pentium II/III Slot 1	100	Intel 440BX	PC 100 SDRAM, Low Density Unbuffered ECC or Non ECC, Max 512 MB	AGP 2x

=== Dual processor, tower form factor ===
Model	Release	CPU Socket	CPU	FSB (MHz)	Chipset	Memory	Max. memory	Graphics	USB
Precision 7920	2017	Dual LGA 3647	Xeon Scalable Processors Family	UPI	Intel C621	DDR4 ECC	1.5/3 TB	4x PCIe x16 Gen 3, up to 750 W	USB 3.1
Precision 7910	2014	Dual LGA 2011-3	Xeon E5-2600 v4	QPI	Intel C612	DDR4 ECC	1 TB	4x PCIe x16 Gen 3, up to 675 W	USB 3.1
Precision T7610	2013	Dual LGA 2011	Xeon E5-2600 v2	QPI	Intel C602	DDR3 ECC RDIMM ECC (Quad Channel)	256 GB or 512 GB	3x PCIe x16 Gen3, up to 675 W	USB 3.0
Precision T7600	2012	Dual LGA 2011	Xeon E5-2600 family 64-bit, up to eight-cores	QPI	Intel C600	DDR3 ECC RDIMM (Quad Channel)	512 GB	3 × PCIe x16 Gen 2 or Gen 3, up to 675 W	USB 3.0
Precision T7500	2009	Dual LGA 1366 (Note: 2nd Socket with Daughterboard)	Xeon 5500 or 5600 series 64-bit, up to six-cores	QPI	Intel 5520	DDR3 ECC RDIMM or DDR3 ECC Unbuffered DIMM (Three-channels) (unbuf = lower max mem)	96 or 192 GB with riser cards	2 × PCIe x16 Gen 2, up to 225 W	USB 2.0
Precision T7400	2007	Dual LGA 771	Xeon Dual-core 5200 or Quad-Core 5400 series 64-bit	1333 or 1600	Intel 5400	DDR2 FB-DIMM (Quad Channel)	64 or 128 GB with riser cards	2 × PCIe x16 (SLI compatible), up to 225 W	USB 2.0
Precision 7820	2017	Dual LGA 3647	Xeon Scalable Processors Family	UPI	Intel C621	DDR4 ECC	384 GB	2x PCIe x16 Gen 3, up to 500 W (300 W with dual CPU)	USB 3.1
Precision T7810	2014	Dual LGA 2011	Xeon E5-2600 v4	QPI	Intel C612	DDR4 ECC	256 GB	2x PCIe x16 Gen 3, up to 300 W	USB 3.0
Precision T5610	2013	Dual LGA 2011	Xeon E5-2600 v2	QPI	Intel C602	RDIMM ECC	128 GB	2x PCIe x16 Gen 3, up to 300 W	USB 3.0
Precision T5600	2012	Dual LGA 2011	Xeon E5-2600 family 64-bit, up to eight-cores	QPI	Intel C600	DDR3 ECC RDIMM (Quad Channel)	128 GB	2x PCIe x16 Gen 3, up to 300 W	USB 3.0
Precision T5500	2009	Dual LGA 1366	Xeon 5500 series 64-bit, up to four-cores or Xeon 5600 series 64-bit, up to six-cores	QPI	Intel 5520	DDR3 ECC RDIMM or DDR3 ECC Unbuffered DIMM (Three-channels) (unbuf = lower max mem)	48 or 72 GB with riser card	2 × PCIe x16 Gen 2 (SLI compatible)	USB 2.0
Precision T5400	2007	Dual LGA 771	Xeon Dual-core 5200 or Quad-Core 5400 series 64-bit	1333	Intel 5400	DDR2 FB-DIMM (Quad Channel 256 bit)	32 GB	2 × PCIe x16 Gen 2 (SLI compatible)	USB 2.0
Precision 690	2006	Dual LGA 771	Xeon Dual-core X5100 or Quad-Core X5300 series 64-bit (Note: Precision 690 motherboard part number MY171 board revision A02 supports Quad-core Xeon processors. System board numbers DT029 F9394, and MY171 board revision A00 and A01 do not support quad-core processors (for these, use Xeon 5000-series or 5100-series FSB 667Mhz Dual-core Xeon processors and PC2-4200 or PC2-5300 FBDIMM ECC RAM).)	1066 or 1333	Intel Greencreek 5000x	DDR2 FB-DIMM (Quad Channel)	64 GB with and without riser cards	PCIe (SLI compatible with dual PCIe riser card & backplate)	USB 1.1 / 2.0
Precision 670	2005	Dual Socket 604	Xeon Single-core (Nocona, Irwindale) or Xeon dual-core (Paxville) 64-bit (Note: The Precision 670 shipped with different motherboards: part numbers X0392, HG593, FC840, MG022, MG024, MG026, U7565, Y9655 or XC837. Only the XC837 board supports the dual-core Paxville DP Xeon processor. The only Paxville CPU that works on the XC837 is the Paxville DP 2.80 GHz (Spec-Code SL8MA, See: List of Intel Xeon microprocessors#"Paxville DP" (90 nm)). You must upgrade the bios to version A07 before attempting to install a Paxville CPU.)	800	Intel E7525	DDR2-400 ECC	16 GB	PCIe	USB 2.0
Precision 650	2002	Dual Socket 604	Xeon (NetBurst - Prestonia (C1 Stepping) 65 W)	533	Intel E7505	DDR-266 - ECC or non-ECC (Standard)	4 GB	AGP Pro110 (8x)	USB 2.0
Precision 530	2001	Dual Socket 603	Xeon (Pentium 4 based)	400	Intel 860	Rambus PC600 or PC800	2 or 4 GB with riser cards	AGP Pro110 (4x)	USB 1.1
Precision 620	2000	Dual Slot 2	Xeon (Pentium III based)	133	Intel 840	Rambus PC800 RDRAM	3 GB	AGP Pro	USB 1.1
Precision 420 (Note: Also available in a desktop version.)	2000	Dual Slot 1	Pentium III	133	Intel 840	Rambus PC800 RDRAM	2 GB	AGP Pro110 (4x)	USB 1.1
Precision 220	2000	Dual Slot 1	Pentium III	100 or 133	Intel 820	Rambus RDRAM	1 GB	AGP 4X	USB 1.1
Precision 610	1999	Dual Slot 2	Intel Xeon (Pentium II or III based)	100	Intel 440GX	PC100 SDRAM	2 GB	AGP	USB 1.1
Precision 410 MT	1998	Dual Slot 1	Intel Pentium II or III	100	Intel 440BX	PC100 SDRAM	1 GB	AGP	USB 1.1
Precision 210	1998	Dual Slot 1	Intel Pentium II or III	100	Intel 440BX	PC100 SDRAM, Low Density Unbuffered, ECC or Non-ECC	512 MB	AGP 2x	USB 1.1

=== Rack-mounted ===
Model	Release	CPU Socket	CPU	FSB (MHz)	Chipset	Memory	Max. memory	Graphics	USB
Precision 7920 Rack	2017	Dual LGA 3647	Xeon Scalable Processor family, up to 28-cores	UPI	Intel C621	DDR4 ECC RDIMM (Quad Channel)	1.5/3.0 TB	Up to 3 × PCIe x16 Gen 3, up to 900 W	USB 3.1
Precision Rack 7910	2014	Dual LGA 2011	Xeon E5-2600 family 64-bit, up to 18-cores	QPI	Intel C612	DDR4 ECC RDIMM (Quad Channel)	768 GB	Up to 3 × PCIe x16 Gen 2 or Gen 3, up to 600 W	USB 3.0
Precision R7610	2013	Dual LGA 2011	Xeon E5-2600 family 64-bit, up to 8-cores	QPI	Intel C600	DDR3 ECC RDIMM (Quad Channel)	256 GB	Up to 3 × PCIe x16 Gen 2 or Gen 3, up to 600 W	USB 2.0
Precision R5500	2011	Dual LGA 1366	Xeon 5600 series 64-bit, up to 6-cores	QPI	Intel 5520	DDR3 FB-DIMM (Quad Channel)	192 GB	2 × PCIe x16	USB 2.0
Precision R5400	2010	Dual LGA 771	Xeon Dual-core 5200 or Quad-core 5400 series 64-bit	1333	Intel 5400	DDR2 ECC FB-DIMM	32 GB	2 × PCIe x16	USB 2.0
Precision Rack 3930	2017	Single LGA 1151	Xeon E family 64-bit, up to 6-cores	QPI	Intel C248	DDR4 ECC RDIMM (dual Channel)	64 GB	Up to 2 × PCIe x16 Gen 2 or Gen 3, up to 600 W	USB 3.0

== Mobile workstations ==
Dell Precision laptops (2001–2024)
Latitude-based XPS-based Inspiron/XPS-based
Type		2001	2002	2003-2004	2005	2006	2007	2008	2009-2010		2011	2012	2013-2014	2015-2016	2017	2018	2019	2020	2021	2022	2023	2024
Type		4:3 screens																16:10				
14.1"	Mainstream				M20															5470	5480	5490
15/16""	Mainstream	M40	M50															5550	5560	5570	5680	5690
17.3"	Mainstream																	5750	5760	5770		
16"	Ultimate																			7670	7680	
17.3"	Ultimate																			7770	7780	
				16:10 screens						16:9 screens												
14"	Mainstream						M2300	M2400												3470	3480	3490
15.4"; 15.6"	Ultrabook												M3800									
15.4"; 15.6"	Entry-level, advanced CPU																3541	3551	3561	3571	3581	3591
15.4"; 15.6"	Entry-level												M2800	3510	3520	3530	3540	3550	3560	3570	3580	3590
15.4"; 15.6"	Mainstream													5510	5520	5530	5540	replaced by 16:10 line				
15.4"; 15.6"	Ultimate			M60	M65	M70	M4300	M4400		M4500	M4600	M4700	M4800	7510	7520	7530	7540	7550	7560	replaced by 16" line		
17.3"	Ultimate					M90	M6300	M6400	M6500		M6600	M6700	M6800	7710	7720	7730	7740	7750	7760	replaced by 16:10 line		

Laptop color codes

Processor

Socketed desktop processor
Socketed mobile processor
Soldered high power processor
Soldered standard power processor
Soldered low power processor
Soldered ultra low power processor

Weight

0.9 kg (2.0 lb)	Up to 0.91 kg
1.0 kg (2.2 lb)	0.92–1.0 kg
1.1 kg (2.4 lb)	1.01–1.1 kg
1.2 kg (2.6 lb)	1.11–1.2 kg
1.3 kg (2.9 lb)	1.21–1.3 kg
1.4 kg (3.1 lb)	1.31–1.4 kg
1.5 kg (3.3 lb)	1.41–1.5 kg
1.6 kg (3.5 lb)	1.51–1.6 kg
1.7 kg (3.7 lb)	1.61–1.7 kg
1.8 kg (4.0 lb)	1.71–1.81 kg
1.9 kg (4.2 lb)	1.81–1.91 kg
2.0 kg (4.4 lb)	1.91–2.03 kg
2.1 kg (4.6 lb)	2.04–2.14 kg
2.3 kg (5.1 lb)	2.15–2.4 kg
2.5 kg (5.5 lb)	2.41–2.75 kg
2.8 kg (6.2 lb)	2.76–3.05 kg
3.1 kg (6.8 lb)	3.06–3.42 kg
3.5 kg (7.7 lb)	3.43–3.99 kg
4.0 kg (8.8 lb)	4.0–4.99 kg
5.5 kg (12 lb)	5.0–6.49 kg
7.2 kg (16 lb)	6.5–7.99 kg
9.1 kg (20 lb)	8.0–9.99 kg
10.7 kg (24 lb)	10–11.99 kg
12.7 kg (28 lb)	12–14.49 kg
14.5 kg (32 lb)	14.5–17.99 kg
18.1 kg (40 lb)	18–20.99 kg
21.7 kg (48 lb)	21–23.99 kg
24 kg (53 lb)	24–28.99 kg
29.5 kg (65 lb)	29 kg and above

Screen resolution

4K or higher
1440p+ (WQHD, QXGA)
1080p+ (Full HD, UXGA)
Better than 768p (SXGA,SXGA+)
600p+ (SVGA, HD, XGA, HD+)
Up to 600p (VGA)

Graphics

Dual standard socket graphics option
Dual proprietary socket graphics option
Standard socket graphics option
Proprietary socket graphics option
Soldered performance graphics option
Soldered midrange graphics option
Soldered mainstream graphics option
Soldered entry graphics option
Integrated entry graphics
Integrated basic graphics

Laptop storage combinations (excluding WWAN slot)

Level	PCIe 4.0 x4	PCIe 3.0 x4	PCIe 3.0 x2	M.2 SATA	mSATA	1.8" SATA	2.5" SATA	1.8" IDE	2.5" IDE
	2019; Not yet (laptops)	2013	2013	2013	2009	2003	2003	1991	1988
	3						2		
	4								
	3						1		
	2						2		
	3					2			
	3								
	2						1		
	4								
	3					1			
	2					2			
	2								
	1						1		
	3								
	2					1			
	1								
	2								
	1					1			
			2				1		
							4		
		1							
			1				1		
							3		
			1						
				1			1		
					1		1		
						1	1		
							2		
									3
						1			
							1		
									2
								1	
									1

Laptop memory

Amount	LPDDR5X	LPDDR5	DDR5	LPDDR4X	LPDDR4	DDR4	LPDDR3	DDR4	DDR3L		DDR3		DDR2		DDR	SDR	EDO	FPM
Amount						dual channel		< dual channel	dual channel	< dual channel	dual channel	< dual channel	dual channel	< dual channel				
Amount	2022 (laptops)	2019 (laptops)	2020	2017	2014	2014	2012	2014	2010		2007		2003		1998	1993	1993	1987
max memory = 512 GB	N/A	N/A	512 GB	N/A	N/A	N/A	N/A	N/A	N/A	N/A	N/A	N/A	N/A	N/A	N/A	N/A	N/A	N/A
max memory = 256 GB	N/A		256 GB (4 slots)	N/A	N/A	N/A	N/A	N/A	N/A	N/A	N/A	N/A	N/A	N/A	N/A	N/A	N/A	N/A
max memory = 128 GB	128 GB		128 GB	N/A	N/A	128 GB (4 slots)	N/A	N/A	N/A	N/A	N/A	N/A	N/A	N/A	N/A	N/A	N/A	N/A
64 GB ≤ max memory < 128 GB		64 GB		N/A	N/A	64 GB	N/A	64 GB (2 slots)	64 GB (4 slots)	N/A	N/A	N/A	N/A	N/A	N/A	N/A	N/A	N/A
32 GB ≤ max memory < 64 GB				32 GB	32 GB	32 GB	N/A		32 GB	32 GB (2 slots)	32 GB (4 slots)	N/A	N/A	N/A	N/A	N/A	N/A	N/A
16 GB ≤ max memory < 32 GB						16 GB	16 GB		16 GB		16 GB	16 GB (2 slots)	16 GB (4 slots)	N/A	N/A	N/A	N/A	N/A
8 GB ≤ max memory < 16 GB						8 GB			8 GB		8 GB		8 GB	8 GB (2 slots)	8 GB (4 slots)	N/A	N/A	N/A
4 GB ≤ max memory < 8 GB						4 GB			4 GB		4 GB		4 GB		4 GB	4 GB (4 slots)	4 GB (4 slots)	N/A
2 GB ≤ max memory < 4 GB						2 GB (8 chips)			2 GB		2 GB		2 GB			2 GB	2 GB	N/A
1 GB ≤ max memory < 2 GB			1 GB (1 chip)	dual channel min	dual channel min	N/A		single channel min	1 GB		1 GB		1 GB					1 GB (4 slots)
512 MB ≤ max memory < 1 GB	N/A	N/A	N/A	single channel min	single channel min	N/A	dual channel min	half channel min	512 MB (8 chips)		512 MB (8 chips)		512 MB					512 MB
256 MB ≤ max memory < 512 MB	N/A	N/A	N/A	256 MB (1 chip)	256 MB (1 chip)	N/A	single channel min	256 MB (1 chip)	N/A	single channel min	N/A	single channel min	256 MB					
128 MB ≤ max memory < 256 MB	N/A	N/A	N/A	N/A	N/A	N/A	128 MB (1 chip)	N/A	N/A	half channel min	N/A	half channel min						
64 MB ≤ max memory < 128 MB	N/A	N/A	N/A	N/A	N/A	N/A	N/A	N/A	N/A	64 MB (1 chip)	N/A	64 MB (1 chip)						
max memory < 64 MB	N/A	N/A	N/A	N/A	N/A	N/A	N/A	N/A	N/A	N/A	N/A	N/A						

=== 3000, 5000, 7000 Series (2015–current) ===
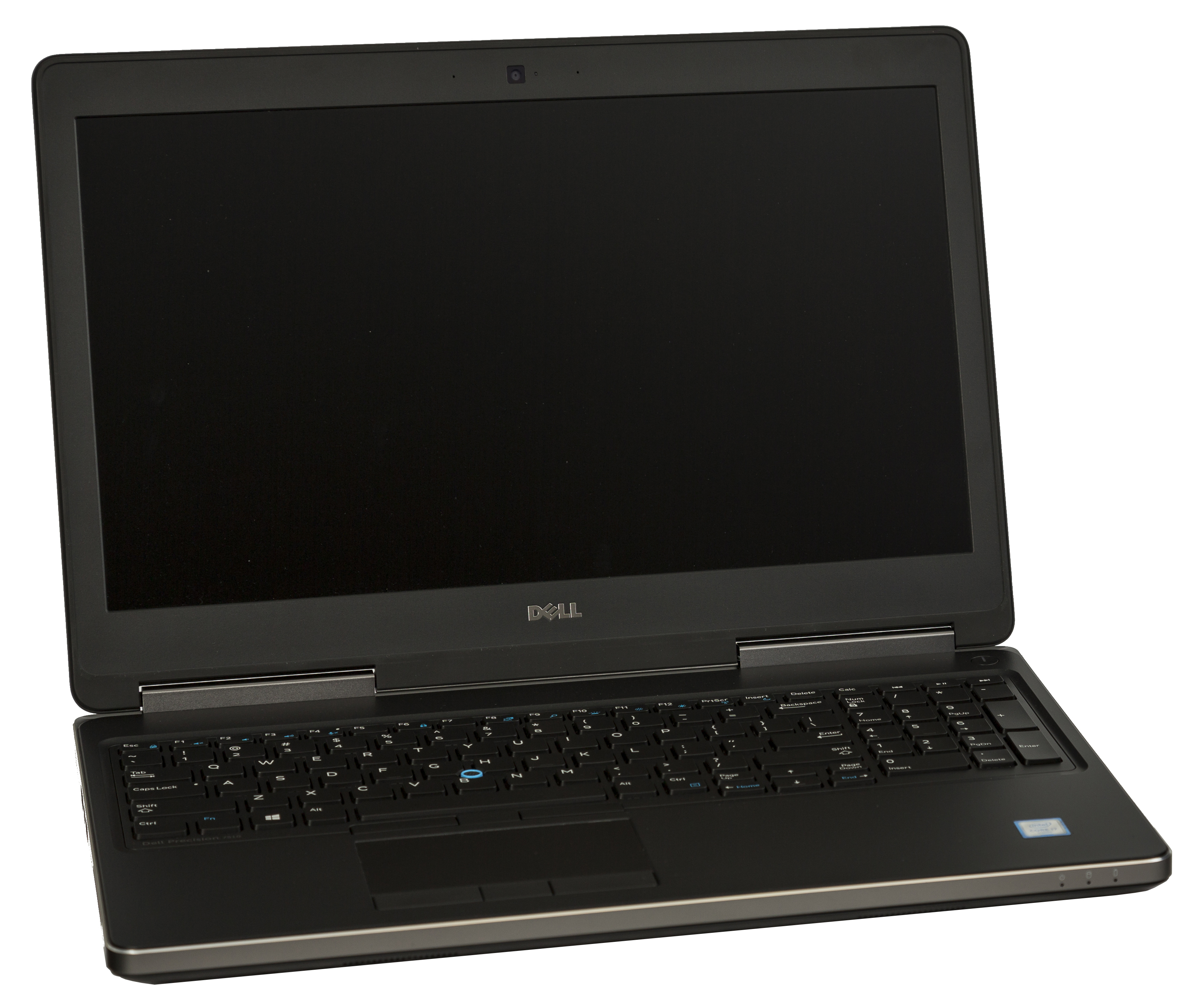
Dell Precision 7510

Dell announced a new series of Latitude laptops in August 2013: the 3000 series, the 5000 series and the 7000 series. The 7000 series introduced Compression Attached Memory Module (CAMM), a new type of memory module that replaced SO-DIMM. In October 2015, Dell announced the first generation of Precision mobile workstations of this series with model numbers 3510, 5510, 7510 and 7710. In January 2017, Dell announced the second generation laptops in this series with model numbers 3520, 5520, 7520 and 7720. In April 2018, Dell announced the third generation of laptops in this series with model numbers 3530, 5530, 7530 and 7730. In May 2019 Dell announced the 4th Generation of the 55xx and 7xxx series mobile workstations with the release of the 5540, 7540 and 7740 models.

Docks/Port Replicators — All first generation (xx10) and second generation (xx20) Precision mobile workstation laptops support the Dell E-Series port replicator except XPS based 5510, 5520 and Latitude based 3520 models. All third generation (xx30) and higher support USB-C docks with some compatible with Thunderbolt 3 or 4 based on options or generation. Specific compatibility, charging/display limitations, or dual USB-C requirements exist requiring verification from Dell.

Model	Release	Weight	Dock	CPU	Chipset	Memory ^{(max)}	Graphics	Network	Storage	Screen	Battery	Operating System
17.3" Ultimate
Precision 7780	2023			13th Gen Intel® Core™ i5-13600HX, vPro® (14 cores, up to 4.8 GHz Turbo, 55 W) 13th Gen Intel® Core™ i7-13850HX, vPro® (20 cores, up to 5.3 GHz Turbo, 55 W) 13th Gen Intel® Core™ i9-13950HX, vPro® (36MB cache, 24 cores, 32 threads, up to 5.5 GHz Turbo, 55 W)			Intel® UHD Graphics Nvidia RTX 1000 Ada Generation, 6 GB GDDR6 Nvidia RTX 2000 Ada, 8 GB GDDR6 Nvidia RTX 3500 Ada, 12GB GDDR6 Nvidia RTX 4000 Ada, 12GB GDDR6 Nvidia RTX 5000 Ada, 16GB GDDR6			17.3" FHD 1920x1080 WVA, 60Hz, anti-glare, Non-touch 17.3" UHD 3840x2160 WLED WVA, 120Hz, anti-glare, Non-touch		Windows 11
Precision 7770	April 2022	3.01 kg (6.6 lb)	USB-C Thunderbolt 4	12th Gen Intel Core (Alder Lake CPUs): i5-12600HX (12 Core, 18 MB Cache, 3.30 GHz to 4.60 GHz)	WM690	128 GB (ECC) 3600 MHz	Intel UHD Graphics Nvidia Quadro RTX A1000 (4 GB GDDR6) Nvidia RTX A3000 (12 GB GDDR6) Nvidia RTX A4000 (16 GB GDDR6) Nvidia Quadro RTX A5500 (16 GB GDDR6)	Intel AX211 + Qualcomm X55 5G/LTE-A CAT22 (DW5830e)	(4x) PCIe NVMe	17.3" FHD WVA 500 nits 17.3" UHD WVA 500 nits		Windows 11
Precision 7760	2021	3.01 kg (6.6 lb)	USB-C Thunderbolt 4	Tiger Lake CPUs (11th gen)	WM590	128 GB (ECC) 3466 MHz	Intel UHD Graphics Nvidia T1200 (4 GB GDDR6) Nvidia RTX A3000 (6 GB GDDR6) Nvidia RTX A4000 (8 GB GDDR6) Nvidia RTX A5000 (16 GB GDDR6)		(4x) PCIe NVMe	17.3" FHD WVA 220 nits 17.3" FHD WVA 500 nits 17.3" UHD WVA 500 nits		Windows 10 Pro Windows 11 Pro
Precision 7750	May 2020	3.13 kg (6.9 lb)	USB-C Thunderbolt 3	10th Gen Intel Core and Intel Xeon W Series: i5-10400H (4 Core, 8 MB Cache, 2.60 GHz to 4.60 GHz); i7-10750H (6 Core, 12 MB Cache, 2.60 GHz to 5.00 GHz); i7-10850H (6 Core, 12 MB Cache, 2.70 GHz to 5.10 GHz); i7-10875H (8 Core, 16 MB Cache, 2.30 GHz to 5.10 GHz); i9-10885H (8 Core, 16 MB Cache, 2.40 GHz to 5.30 GHz); Xeon W-10855M (6 Core, 12 MB Cache, 2.80 GHz to 5.10 GHz); Xeon W-10885M (8 Core, 16 MB Cache, 2.40 GHz to 5.30 GHz)	WM490	128 GB (ECC) 3200 MHz	Intel UHD Graphics Nvidia Quadro T1000 (4 GB GDDR6) Nvidia Quadro RTX 3000 (6 GB GDDR6) Nvidia Quadro RTX 4000 (8 GB GDDR6) Nvidia Quadro RTX 5000 (16 GB GDDR6)	Intel AX201 + Qualcomm X20 LTE-A CAT18 (DW5821e)	(4x) PCIe NVMe	17.3" FHD WVA 220 nits 17.3" FHD WVA 500 nits 17.3" UHD WVA 500 nits		Windows 10 Pro
Precision 7750	pointing stick dropped; reduced keyboard layout.											
Precision 7740	Jul 2019	3.08 kg (6.8 lb)	USB-C 4 Thunderbolt 3	i5-9400H(4 cores, 8 MB Cache, 2.50 GHz Up to 4.30 GHz) i7-9750H (6 core, 12 MB Cache, 2.60 GHz Up to 4.50 GHz) i7-9850H (6 core, 12 MB Cache, 2.60 GHz Up to 4.60 GHz) i9-9880H (8 core, 16 MB Cache, 2.30 GHz Up to 4.80 GHz) i9-9980HK (8 core, 16 MB Cache, 2.80 GHz Up to 5.00 GHz) Xeon E-2276M (6 core, 12 MB Cache, 2.80 GHz Up to 4.70 GHz) Xeon E-2286M (8 core, 16 MB Cache, 2.40 GHz Up to 5.00 GHz)	CM246	128 GB (non-ECC) 2667 MHz; 64 GB (ECC\non-ECC) 2667 MHz; 32 GB (non-ECC) 2933 MHz DDR4 (4 slots)	Intel HD GFX Radeon Pro WX 7130 (8 GB GDDR5) or WX 3200 (4 GB GDDR5) Nvidia Quadro RTX 3000 (6 GB GDDR6) or Quadro RTX 4000 (8 GB GDDR6) or Quadro RTX 5000 (16 GB GDDR6)		(4x) PCle NVMe or (3x) PCIe NVMe and (1x) 2.5” HDDs (up to 8 TB)	17.3" HD+ TN 1600x900 17.3" UltraSharp FHD IPS 1920x1080 17.3" UltraSharp UHD IGZO 3840x2160		Windows 10 Pro
Precision 7730	Jun 2018	3.17 kg (7.0 lb)	USB-C Thunderbolt 3	i5-8300H (4 core) i5-8400H (4 core) i7-8750H (6 core) i7-8850H (6 core) i9-8950HK (6 core); Xeon E-2176M (6 core); Xeon E-2186M (6 core)	CM246	128 GB (non-ECC) 2667 MHz; 64 GB (ECC\non-ECC) 2667 MHz; 32 GB (non-ECC) 2933 MHz DDR4 (4 slots)	Intel UHD P630 or UHD 630 + Nvidia Quadro; P3200 (6 GB GDDR5) or P4200 (8 GB GDDR5) or P5200 (16 GB GDDR5)		3 M.2 x4; + 1 M.2 x4 or SATA	1600x900 TN; 1920×1080 IPS; 3840×2160 IGZO touch		Windows 10 Pro
Precision 7730	First 17" Precision with a touch screen as option; Windows 10 Pro											
Precision 7720	Mar 2017	3.42 kg (7.5 lb)	E-Port	Intel Core i5-7300HQ (4 core, 6 MB Cache, 2.50 GHz Up to 3.50 GHz) i5-7440HQ (4 core, 6 MB Cache, 2.80 GHz Up to 3.80 GHz) i7-7700HQ (4 core, 6 MB Cache, 2.80 GHz Up to 3.80 GHz) i7-7820HQ (4 core, 8 MB Cache, 2.90 GHz Up to 3.90 GHz) i7-7920HQ (4 core, 8 MB Cache, 3.10 GHz Up to 4.10 GHz) Intel Xeon; E3-1505M v6 (4 core, 8 MB Cache, 3.00 GHz Up to 4.00 GHz); E3-1535M v6 (4 core, 8 MB Cache, 3.10 GHz Up to 4.20 GHz)	CM238	128 GB (non-ECC); 64 GB (ECC\non-ECC) 2400 MHz; 32 GB (Note: max 8 GB per slot) (non-ECC) 2667 MHz DDR4 (4 slots)	Intel Iris Pro P580, HD P580 or HD 630 + Radeon Pro; WX 7100 (8 GB GDDR5) or Nvidia Quadro; M1200 (4 GB GDDR5) or P3000 (6 GB GDDR5) or P4000 (8 GB GDDR5) or P5000 (16 GB GDDR5)		2 M.2 x4; + 1 M.2 x4 or SATA	1600x900 TN LED; 1920×1080 IPS LED; 3840×2160 IGZO LED		Windows 10 Pro
Precision 7720	Last Precision with a MXM slot, 7730 uses a proprietary DGFF module; Windows 10 Pro 64-bit / Ubuntu 16.04LTS											
Precision 7710 / Precision 17 (7000 Series)	2015	3.42 kg (7.5 lb)	E-Port	Intel Core i5-6300HQ i7-6820HQ i7-6920HQ; Intel Xeon; E3-1505M; E3-1535M; E3-1545M; E3-1575M	CM236	128 GB (non-ECC); 64 GB (ECC\non-ECC) 2133 MHz; 32 GB (non-ECC) 2667 MHz DDR4 (4 slots)	Intel Iris Pro P580, HD P530 or HD 530 + AMD FirePro; W5170M (2 GB GDDR5) or W7170M (4 GB GDDR5) or Nvidia Quadro; M3000M (4 GB GDDR5) or M4000M (4 GB GDDR5) or M5000M (8 GB GDDR5)			1920×1080 IPS anti-glare LED; 3840×2160 IGZO anti-glare LED		Windows 10 Pro
Precision 7710 / Precision 17 (7000 Series)	Covet Edition dropped, IPS screen reintroduced, 4K screen introduced; Windows 7 Pro 64-bit / Windows 10 / Ubuntu 14.04LTS											
16" Ultimate
Precision 7680	2023											Windows 11 Pro
Precision 7670	2022			12th Gen Intel Core: i5-12600HX; i7-12850HX; i9-12950HX	Intel PCH-LP	DDR5 CAMM module Minimum: 16 GB, 1 x 16 GB, DDR5, 4800 MHz, 32 GB, 1 x 32 GB, DDR5, 4800 MHz, non-ECC 64 GB, 1 x 64 GB, DDR5, 4800 MHz, non-ECC module 128 GB, 1 x 128 GB, DDR5, 3600 MHz, non-ECC,						Windows 11 Pro
15.6" Ultimate
Precision 7560	2021	2.49 kg (5.5 lb)	USB-C Thunderbolt 4	11th Gen Intel Core and Intel Xeon W Series: i5-11500H (6 Core, 12 MB Cache, 2.90 GHz to 4.60 GHz); i7-11600H (6 Core, 18 MB Cache, 2.90 GHz to 4.60 GHz); i7-11800H (8 Core, 24 MB Cache, 2.30 GHz to 4.60 GHz); i7-11850H (8 Core, 24 MB Cache, 2.50 GHz to 4.80 GHz); i9-11950H (8 Core, 24 MB Cache, 2.60 GHz to 5.00 GHz); Xeon W-11855M (6 Core, 18 MB Cache, 3.20 GHz to 4.90 GHz); Xeon W-11955M (8 Core, 24 MB Cache, 2.60 GHz to 5.00 GHz)	WM590	128 GB (ECC\non-ECC) 3200 MHz; 64 GB (non-ECC) 3466 MHz DDR4 (4 slots)	Intel UHD Graphics Nvidia T1200 (4 GB GDDR6) Nvidia RTX A2000 (4 GB GDDR6) Nvidia RTX A3000 (6 GB GDDR6) Nvidia RTX A4000 (8 GB GDDR6) Nvidia RTX A5000 (16 GB GDDR6)	Intel AX210 + Qualcomm X55 5G/LTE-A CAT22 (DW5830e)	(3x) PCIe NVMe	1920×1080 WVA 220 nits 1920×1080 WVA 500 nits 1920×1080 WVA touch 500 nits 3840×2160 HDR600 600 nits		Windows 10 Pro Windows 11 Pro
Precision 7550	2020	2.49 kg (5.5 lb)	USB-C Thunderbolt 3	10th Gen Intel Core and Intel Xeon W Series: i5-10400H (4 Core, 8 MB Cache, 2.60 GHz to 4.60 GHz); i7-10750H (6 Core, 12 MB Cache, 2.60 GHz to 5.00 GHz); i7-10850H (6 Core, 12 MB Cache, 2.70 GHz to 5.10 GHz); i7-10875H (8 Core, 16 MB Cache, 2.30 GHz to 5.10 GHz); i9-10885H (8 Core, 16 MB Cache, 2.40 GHz to 5.30 GHz); Xeon W-10855M (6 Core, 12 MB Cache, 2.80 GHz to 5.10 GHz); Xeon W-10885M (8 Core, 16 MB Cache, 2.40 GHz to 5.30 GHz)	WM490	128 GB (non-ECC) 2933 MHz; 128 GB (ECC\non-ECC) 2667 MHz; 32 GB (non-ECC) 3200 MHz DDR4 (4 slots)	Intel UHD Graphics Nvidia Quadro T1000 (4 GB GDDR6) Nvidia Quadro T2000 (4 GB GDDR6) Nvidia Quadro RTX 3000 (6 GB GDDR6) Nvidia Quadro RTX 4000 (8 GB GDDR6) Nvidia Quadro RTX 5000 (16 GB GDDR6)	Intel AX201 + Qualcomm X20 LTE-A CAT18 (DW5821e)	(3x) PCIe NVMe			Windows 10 Pro
Precision 7540	2019	2.53 kg (5.6 lb)	USB-C Thunderbolt 3	9th Gen Intel Core and Intel Xeon E Series: i5-9400H (4 core, 8 MB Cache, 2.50 GHz to 4.30 GHz); i7-9750H (6 core, 12 MB Cache, 2.60 GHz to 4.50 GHz); i7-9850H (6 core, 12 MB Cache, 2.60 GHz to 4.60 GHz); i9-9880H (8 core, 16 MB Cache, 2.30 GHz to 4.80 GHz); i9-9980HK (8 core, 16 MB Cache, 2.40 GHz to 5.00 GHz); Xeon E-2276M (6 core, 12 MB Cache, 2.80 GHz to 4.70 GHz); Xeon E-2286M (8 core, 16 MB Cache, 2.40 GHz to 5.00 GHz)	CM246	128 GB (ECC\non-ECC) 2667 MHz; 64 GB (non-ECC) 3200 MHz DDR4 (4 slots)	Intel UHD P630 or UHD 630 + AMD Radeon Pro; WX 3200 (4 GB GDDR5) or Nvidia Quadro; T1000 (4 GB GDDR5) or Quadro T2000 (4 GB GDDR5) or RTX 3000 (6 GB GDDR6) or RTX 4000 (8 GB GDDR6) or RTX 5000 (16GB GDDR6)	Intel AX200 + Intel XMM 7360 LTE-A CAT10 (DW5820e)				Windows 10 Pro
Precision 7530	Jun 2018	2.53 kg (5.6 lb)	USB-C Thunderbolt 3	i5-8300H (4 core) i5-8400H (4 core) i7-8750H (6 core) i7-8850H (6 core) i9-8950HK (6 core); Xeon E-2176M (6 core); Xeon E-2186M (6 core)	CM246	128 GB (non-ECC) 2667 MHz; 64 GB (ECC\non-ECC) 2667 MHz; 32 GB (non-ECC) 3200 MHz DDR4 (4 slots)	Intel UHD P630 or UHD 630 + Nvidia Quadro; P1000 (4 GB GDDR5) or P2000 (4 GB GDDR5) or P3200 (6 GB GDDR5)	Intel AC9260 or Qualcomm QCA6174A + Qualcomm X7 LTE-A CAT6 (DW5811e)	2 M.2 x4; + 1 M.2 x4 or SATA	1920×1080 TN; 1920×1080 UltraSharp IPS; 1920×1080 UltraSharp IPS touch 3840×2160 IGZO		Windows 10 Pro
Precision 7530	Windows 10 Pro											
Precision 7520	Mar 2017	2.8 kg (6.2 lb)	E-Port	Intel Core i5-7300HQ i5-7440HQ i7-7700HQ i7-7820HQ i7-7920HQ; Intel Xeon; E3-1505M v6 E3-1535M v6	CM238	128 GB (non-ECC); 64 GB (ECC\non-ECC) 2400 MHz; 32 GB (non-ECC) 2667 MHz DDR4 (4 slots)	Intel Iris Pro P580, HD P580 or HD 630 + Radeon Pro; WX 4130 (2 GB GDDR5) or WX 4150 (4 GB GDDR5) or Nvidia Quadro; M1200 (4 GB GDDR5) or M2200 (4 GB GDDR5)	Intel AC8265 or Qualcomm QCA6174A + Qualcomm X7 LTE-A CAT6 (DW5811e)		1920×1080 IPS (Option touch); 3840×2160 IGZO anti-glare LED		Windows 10 Pro
Precision 7520	Along the 7720 the last PMWs with a dock port and a MXM slot, 7530 and 7730 use the Dell proprietary DGFF video card; Windows 10 Pro 64-bit / Ubuntu 16.04LTS											
Precision 7510 / Precision 17 (7000 Series)	2015	2.79 kg (6.2 lb)	E-Port	Intel Core i5-6300HQ i7-6820HQ i7-6920HQ; Intel Xeon; E3-1505M; E3-1535M; E3-1545M; E3-1575M	CM236	128 GB (non-ECC); 64 GB (ECC\non-ECC) 2133 MHz; 32 GB (non-ECC) 2667 MHz DDR4 (4 slots)	Intel HD P530 or HD 530 + AMD FirePro; W5170M (2 GB GDDR5) or Nvidia Quadro; M1000M (2 GB GDDR5) or M2000M (4 GB GDDR5)	Intel AC8260 or Qualcomm QCA6174A + Qualcomm X7 LTE-A CAT6 (DW5811e)		1920×1080 TN anti-glare LED; 1920×1080 IPS anti-glare LED; 1920×1080 IPS Touch LED; 3840×2160 IGZO anti-glare LED		Windows 10 Pro
Precision 7510 / Precision 17 (7000 Series)	Windows 7 Pro 64 / Windows 10 Pro 64-bit / Ubuntu 14.04LTS											
17.3" Mainstream
Precision 5770	Mar 2022											Windows 11 Pro
Precision 5760	May 2021											Windows 10 Pro
Precision 5750	May 2020											Windows 10 Pro
Precision 5740	2019											Windows 10 Pro
Precision 5730	2018											Windows 10 Pro
Precision 5710	2016											Windows 10 Pro
16" Mainstream
Precision 5690	Feb 2024	2.03 kg (4.5 lb)	USB-C Thunderbolt 4 type C (with & without power)	Core Ultra 5 135H (14 core); Core Ultra 7 155H (16 core); Core Ultra 7 165H (16 core); Core Ultra 9 185H (16 core)	Integrated in CPU	16 GB LPDDR5x; 32 GB LPDDR5x; 64 GB LPDDR5x 7467 MHz; LPDDR5x soldered; non-ECC	Intel® Iris Xe + Nvidia RTX A1000 Ada w/6 GB GDDR6 + Nvidia RTX A2000 Ada w/8 GB GDDR6 + Nvidia RTX A3500 Ada w/12 GB GDDR6 + Nvidia RTX A4000 Ada w/12 GB GDDR6 + Nvidia RTX A5000 Ada w/16 GB GDDR6	Intel BE200	2 x M.2 PCIe NVMe	1920×1200 IGZO; 3840×2400 IGZO touch Windows 11 Home; Windows 11 Pro; Ubuntu 22.04		Windows 11 Pro
Precision 5680	Mar 2023	1.91 kg (4.2 lb)	USB-C Thunderbolt 4 type C (with & without power)	i5-13600H (12 core) i7-13700H (14 core) i7-13800H (14 core) i9-13900H (14 core)	Integrated in CPU	16 GB LPDDR5 6400 MHz; 32 GB LPDDR5 6000 MHz; 64 GB LPDDR5 6000 MHz LPDDR5 soldered; non-ECC	Intel® Iris Xe + Nvidia RTX A1000 w/6 GB GDDR6 + Nvidia RTX A2000 Ada w/8 GB GDDR6 + Nvidia RTX A3500 Ada w/12 GB GDDR6 + Nvidia RTX A4000 Ada w/12 GB GDDR6 + Nvidia RTX A5000 Ada w/16 GB GDDR6 + Nvidia RTX 4090 w/16 GB GDDR6	Intel AX211	2 x M.2 PCIe NVMe	1920×1200 IGZO; 3840×2400 IGZO touch Windows 11 Home; Windows 11 Pro; Windows 11 Enterprice; Ubuntu 22.04		Windows 11 Pro
15.6" Mainstream
Precision 5570	Mar 2022	1.88 kg (4.1 lb)	USB-C Thunderbolt 4 type C (with & without power)	i5-12500H (12 core) i5-12600H (12 core) i7-12700H (14 core) i7-12800H (14 core) i9-12900H (14 core) i9-12900HK (14 core)	WM690	8 GB DDR5; 16 GB DDR5; 32 GB DDR5; 64 GB DDR5 4800 MHz; DDR5 (2 slots); non-ECC	Intel® Iris Xe + Nvidia RTX A1000 w/4 GB GDDR6 + Nvidia RTX A2000 w/8 GB GDDR6	Intel AX211	2 x M.2 PCIe NVMe	1920×1200 IGZO; 3840×2400 IGZO touch Windows 11 Home; Windows 11 Pro		Windows 11 Home; Windows 11 Pro
Precision 5560	Nov 2021	1.84 kg (4.1 lb)	USB-C Thunderbolt 4 type C (with & without power)	i5-11500H (6 core) i7-11800H (8 core) i7-11850H (8 core) i9-11950H (8 core); Xeon W-11955M (8 core)	WM590	8 GB DDR4; 16 GB DDR4; 32 GB DDR4; 64 GB DDR4 3200 MHz; DDR4 (2 slots); both ECC & non-ECC	Intel® UHD P630 (on Xeon only) or 630 + Nvidia T1200 w/4 GB GDDR6 + Nvidia RTX A2000 w/4 GB GDDR6	Intel AX201	2 x M.2 PCIe NVMe	1920×1200 IGZO; 3840×2400 IGZO touch Windows 10 Pro; Windows 11 Pro		Windows 11 Home; Windows 11 Pro
Precision 5550	Jun 2020	1.85 kg (4.1 lb)	USB-C Thunderbolt 3	i5-10400H (4 core) i7-10750H (6 core) i7-10850H (6 core) i7-10875H (8 core) i9-10885H (8 core); Xeon W-10855M (6 core)	WM490	64 GB (non-ECC) 2933 MHz DDR4 (2 slots)	Intel UHD + Nvidia Quadro; T1000 (4 GB GDDR6) or T2000 (4 GB GDDR6)	Intel AX201	2 x M.2 PCIe NVMe	1920×1200 IGZO 3840×2400 IGZO touch Windows 10 Pro		Windows 10 Pro
Precision 5550	First Precision since the 2010s' M6500 to feature a 16:10 display											
Precision 5540	Jul 2019	1.78 kg (3.9 lb)	USB-C Thunderbolt 3	i9-9980HK (8 Core, 16 MB Cache, 2.40 GHz to 5.00 GHz) i9-9880H (8 Core, 16 MB Cache, 2.30 GHz to 4.80 GHz); Xeon E-2276M (6 Core, 12 MB Cache, 2.80 GHz to 4.70 GHz) i7-9850H (6 Core, 12 MB Cache, 2.60 GHz to 4.6 GHz Turbo) i7-9750H (6 Core, 12 MB Cache, 2.60 GHz to 4.5 GHz Turbo) i5-9400H (4 Core, 8 MB Cache, 2.50 GHz to 4.3 GHz Turbo)	CM246	64 GB (non-ECC) 2667 MHz DDR4 (2 slots)	Intel UHD 630 or P630 for Xeon + Nvidia Quadro T1000 w/4 GB GDDR5 + Nvidia Quadro T2000 w/4 GB GDDR5	Intel AX200 or Intel AC9260 or Qualcomm QCA6174A	1 x M.2 PCIe NVMe; + 1 x 2.5" SATA (requires smaller 56Wh battery)	1920×1080 Anti-Glare IPS; 3840×2160 IGZO Touch; 3840×2160 OLED; Windows 10 Pro		Windows 10 Pro
Precision 5530	Jun 2018	1.78 kg (3.9 lb)	USB-C Thunderbolt 3	i5-8300H (4 core) i5-8400H (4 core) i7-8850H (6 core) i9-8950HK (6 core); Xeon E-2176M (6 core)	CM246	64 GB (non-ECC) 2667 MHz DDR4 (2 slots; soldered in 2-in-1 version)	Intel UHD P630 or UHD 630 + Nvidia Quadro; P1000 (4 GB GDDR5) or P2000 (4 GB GDDR5)	Intel AC9260 or Qualcomm QCA6174A	1 x M.2 PCIe NVMe; + 1 x 2.5" SATA (requires smaller 56Wh battery)	1920×1080 IGZO 3840×2160 IGZO touch Windows 10 Pro		Windows 10 Pro
Precision 5530	Based on the XPS 15 9570, 2-in-1 version based on a XPS 15 9575 chassis.											
Precision 5520	Jan 2017	1.78 kg (3.9 lb)	USB-C Thunderbolt 3	Intel Core i5-7300HQ i5-7440HQ i7-7820HQ; Xeon E3-1505M v6	CM238	64 GB (non-ECC) 2400 MHz DDR4 (2 slots)	Intel HD 630 or P630 + Nvidia Quadro; M1200 (4 GB GDDR5)	Intel AC8265 or Qualcomm QCA6174A	1 x M.2 PCIe NVMe; + 1 x 2.5" SATA (requires smaller 56Wh battery)	1920×1080 IPS anti-glare LED; 3840×2160 IGZO Touch LED		Windows 10 Pro
Precision 5520	Reduced usability due to shallow keyboard; Windows 10, Ubuntu 16.04 LTS, Anniversary Edition available with Abyss Black chassis											
Precision 5510 / Precision 15 (5000 Series)	2015	1.78 kg (3.9 lb)	USB-C Thunderbolt 3	Intel core i5-6300HQ i7-6820HQ Xeon E3-1505M v5	CM236	64 GB (non-ECC) 2133 MHz; DDR4 (2 slots)	Intel HD 530 or P530 + Nvidia Quadro M1000M (2 GB GDDR5)	Intel AC8260 or Qualcomm QCA6174A	1 x M.2 PCIe NVMe; + 1 x 2.5" SATA (requires smaller 56Wh battery)	1920×1080 IPS anti-glare LED; 3840×2160 IGZO Touch LED		Windows 10 Pro
Precision 5510 / Precision 15 (5000 Series)	Reduced usability due to shallow keyboard and narrowed size of Enter/Return key; Windows 7 Pro 64, Windows 10, Ubuntu 14.04 LTS											
14" Mainstream
Precision 5490	2024											Windows 11 Pro
Precision 5480	2023											Windows 11 Pro
Precision 5470	2022											Windows 11 Pro
15.6" Entry-level
Precision 3591	Mar 2024		USB-C Thunderbolt 4	Core Ultra 5 135H (14 core); Core Ultra 7 165H (16 core)	Integrated in CPU	64 GB (ECC\non-ECC) 5600 MHz DDR5 (2 slots)	Intel Iris Xe (dual-channel) or Intel UHD (single-channel) + Nvidia RTX; A500 (4 GB GDDR6) or A1000 (6 GB GDDR6) or RTX A2000 Ada (8 GB GDDR6)					Windows 11 Pro
Precision 3590	Mar 2024											Windows 11 Pro
Precision 3581	Mar 2023	1.79 kg (3.9 lb)	USB-C Thunderbolt 4	Intel core i5-13600H (12 core) i7-13700H (14 core) i7-13800H (14 core) i9-13900H (14 core)	Integrated in CPU	64 GB (ECC\non-ECC) 4800 MHz DDR5 (2 slots)	Intel Iris Xe (dual-channel) or Intel UHD (single-channel) + Nvidia RTX; A500 (4 GB GDDR6) or A1000 (6 GB GDDR6) or RTX A2000 Ada (8 GB GDDR6)					Windows 11 Pro
Precision 3580	Mar 2023	1.61 kg (3.5 lb)	USB-C Thunderbolt 4	Intel core i5-1335U (10 core) i7-1355U (10 core) i5-1340P (12 core) i5-1350P (12 core) i7-1360P (12 core) i7-1370P (14 core)	Integrated in CPU		Intel Iris Xe (dual-channel) or Intel UHD (single-channel) + Nvidia RTX A500 (4 GB GDDR6)					Windows 11 Pro
Precision 3571	Mar 2022	1.79 kg (3.9 lb)	USB-C Thunderbolt 4	Intel core i5-12500H (12 core) i5-12600H (12 core) i7-12700H (14 core) i7-12800H (14 core) i9-12900H (14 core)	Integrated in CPU	64 GB (ECC\non-ECC) 4800 MHz DDR5 (2 slots)	Intel Iris Xe + Nvidia; T600 (4 GB GDDR6) or RTX A1000 (4 GB GDDR6) or RTX A2000 (8 GB GDDR6)					Windows 11 Pro
Precision 3570	Mar 2022	1.59 kg (3.5 lb)	USB-C Thunderbolt 4	Intel core i5-1235U (10 core) i5-1245U (10 core) i5-1250P (12 core) i7-1255U (10 core) i7-1265U (10 core) i7-1270P (12 core) i7-1280P (14 core)	Integrated in CPU	64 GB (ECC\non-ECC) 4800 MHz DDR5 (2 slots)	Intel Iris Xe + Nvidia Quadro; T550 (4 GB GDDR6) or RTX A500 (4 GB GDDR6)					Windows 11 Pro
Precision 3561	Jan 2021	1.79 kg (3.9 lb)	USB-C Thunderbolt 4	Intel core i5-11400H (6 core) i5-11500H (6 core) i7-10800H (8 core) i7-11850H (8 core) i9-11950H (8 core); Xeon W-11855M (6 core)	WM590	64 GB (ECC\non-ECC) 3200 MHz DDR4 (2 slots)	Intel UHD + Nvidia; T600 (4 GB GDDR6) or T1200 (4 GB GDDR6)					
Precision 3560	Jan 2021	1.59 kg (3.5 lb)	USB-C Thunderbolt 4	Intel core i5-1135G7 (4 core) i5-1145G7 (4 core) i7-1165G7 (4 core) i7-1185G7 (4 core)	Integrated in CPU	64 GB (non ECC) 3200 MHz DDR4 (2 slots)	Intel Iris Xe + Nvidia T500 (2 GB GDDR6)					
Precision 3551	May 2020	1.89 kg (4.2 lb)	USB-C Thunderbolt 3	Intel core i5-10300H (4 core) i5-10400H (4 core) i7-10750H (6 core) i7-10850H (6 core) i7-10875H (8 core) i9-10885H (8 core); Xeon W-10855M (6 core)	WM490	64 GB (ECC\non-ECC) 2933 MHz DDR4 (2 slots)	Intel UHD 630 + Nvidia Quadro P620 (4 GB GDDR5)		1 M.2 x4; + 1 M.2 x4 or SATA			
Precision 3550	May 2020	1.86 kg (4.1 lb)	USB-C Thunderbolt 3	Intel core i5-10210U (4 core) i5-10310U (4 core) i7-10510U (4 core) i7-10610U (4 core) i7-10810U (6 core)	Integrated in CPU	32 GB (non ECC) 2667 MHz DDR4 (2 slots)	Intel UHD 620 + Nvidia Quadro P520 (2 GB GDDR5)					
Precision 3541	2019	1.97 kg (4.3 lb)	USB-C Thunderbolt 3	Intel core i5-9300H (4 core) i5-9400H (4 core) i7-9750H (6 core) i7-9850H (6 core) i9-9980H (8 core); Xeon E-2276M (6 core)	CM246	32 GB (ECC\non-ECC) 2667 MHz DDR4 (2 slots)	Intel UHD 630 or UHD P630 + Nvidia Quadro P620 (4 GB GDDR5)					
Precision 3540	2019	1.83 kg (4.0 lb)	USB-C Thunderbolt 3	Intel core i5-8265U (4 core) i5-8354U (4 core) i7-8565U (4 core) i7-8665U (4 core)	Integrated in CPU	32 GB (non ECC) 2400 MHz DDR4 (2 slots)	Intel UHD 620 + AMD Radeon Pro WX2100 (2 GB GDDR5)					
Precision 3530	Jun 2018	2.03 kg (4.5 lb)	USB-C Thunderbolt 3	Intel core i5-8300H (4 core) i5-8400H (4 core) i7-8750H (6 core) i7-8850H (6 core); Xeon E-2176M (6 core)	CM246	64 GB (non-ECC); 32 GB (ECC\non-ECC) 2400 MHz or 32 GB (non-ECC) 2667 MHz DDR4 (2 slots)	Intel UHD 630 or UHD P630 + Nvidia Quadro P600 (4 GB GDDR5)	Intel AC9560 or Qualcomm QCA6174A + Qualcomm X7 LTE-A CAT6 (DW5811e)	1 M.2 x2; + 1 M.2 x4 or SATA	Windows 10 Pro; Ubuntu 16.04 1366×768 TN; 1920×1080 IPS; 1920×1080 IPS touch		
Precision 3520	Jan 2017	2.21 kg (4.9 lb)	USB-C Thunderbolt 3	Intel core i5 (7440HQ, 7300HQ) i7 (7700HQ, 7820HQ); Xeon E3-1505M v6	CM238	64 GB (non-ECC); 32 GB (ECC\non-ECC) 2400 MHz DDR4 (2 slots)	Intel HD 630 or P630 + Nvidia Quadro M620 (2 GB GDDR5)	Intel AC8265 or Qualcomm QCA6174A + Qualcomm X7 LTE-A CAT6 (DW5811e)	1 M.2 x4; + 1 M.2 x4 or SATA	1366×768 TN LED; 1920×1080 IPS LED; 1920×1080 Touch LED		
Precision 3520	Trackpoint is optional; based on a Latitude 5580 chassis. Windows 10, Ubuntu 16.04 LTS											
Precision 3510 / Precision 15 (3000 Series)	2015	2.23 kg (4.9 lb)	E-Port	Intel core i5 (6300HQ) i7 (6700HQ, 6820HQ); Xeon E3-1505M v5	CM236	64 GB (non-ECC); 32 GB (ECC\non-ECC) 2133 MHz DDR4 (2 slots)	Intel HD 530 or P530 + AMD FirePro W5130M (2 GB GDDR5)	Intel AC8260 or Qualcomm QCA6174A + Qualcomm X7 LTE-A CAT6 (DW5811e)	1 M.2 x4; + 1 M.2 x4 or SATA	1366×768 TN anti-glare LED; 1920×1080 IPS anti-glare LED; 1920×1080 Touch anti-glare LED		
Precision 3510 / Precision 15 (3000 Series)	Windows 7 Pro 64, Windows 10, Ubuntu 14.04 LTS											
14" Entry-level
Precision 3490	Mar 2024											Windows 11 Pro
Precision 3480	Mar 2023											Windows 11 Pro
Precision 3470	Apr 2022											Windows 11 Pro

=== Precision Mobile Thin & Light (XPS 15 based) (2013–2015) ===
Model	Release	Weight	CPU	Chipset	Memory ^{(max)}	Graphics	Storage	Screen	Audio	Battery	Operating System
15,6" Ultraportable
Precision M3800 (2015)	Jan 2015	1.88 kg (4.1 lb)	Intel Core i7-4712HQ (4 x 2.3 GHz, 6 MB L3)	Intel HM87	16 GB DDR3L (2 slots) 1600 MHz	Nvidia Quadro K1100M (2 GB GDDR5)	1 mSATA; Option + 1 SATA	1920x1080 touch 3840x2160 IGZO touch			Windows 8.1
Precision M3800 (2015)	Re-launched with an Intel i7 (4712HQ) processor, adds Thunderbolt 2, and an option for 4K Ultra HD Ultratouch display.										
Precision M3800	Nov 2013	1.88 kg (4.1 lb)	Intel Core i7-4702HQ (4 x 2.2 GHz, 6 MB L3)	Intel HM87	16 GB DDR3L (2 slots) 1600 MHz	Nvidia Quadro K1100M (2 GB GDDR5)	1 mSATA; Option + 1 SATA	1920x1080 3200x1800 touch			Windows 8.1
Precision M3800	Identical case to the XPS 15 (9530)										

=== Latitude E Series based (2008–2014) ===
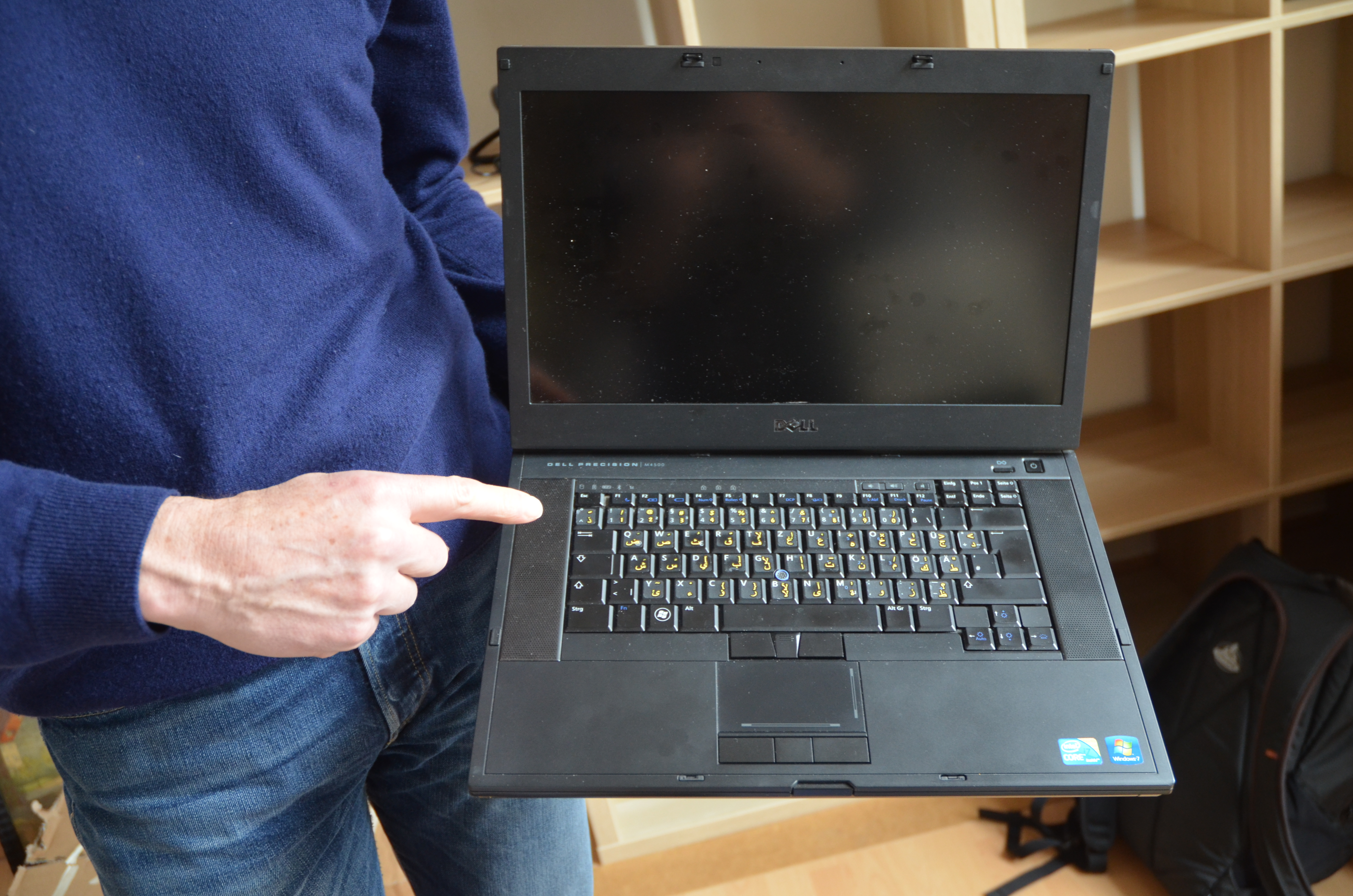
Precision M4500

Dell launched the E Series of laptops on August 12, 2008 with a collection of Latitude (E4200, E5400, E5500, E6400, E6500, E6400 ATG/XFR) and Precision (M4400, M2400) computers. Both the Latitude and Precision computers are compatible with the new E Series docking stations (E-Port and E-Port Plus). Notably, the 17" models do not share a chassis with the Inspiron series anymore, and starting with the M4600 the 15" Precisions do not share a Latitude chassis either. QHD, UHD and RGBLED IPS models have a disabled iGPU. This has several downsides: the power consumption during low load is high, and thus the battery runtimes clearly suffer despite the high-capacity battery, and Intel's QuickSync Video cannot be used. AMD GPU equipped models before the M4800/M6800 also do not support AMD Enduro Switchable Graphics.

Model	Release	Weight	CPU Socket	CPU	Chipset	Memory ^{(max)}	Graphics (Note: All M4###/M6### laptops graphics options use dedicated memory.)	Storage	Screen	Audio	Battery	Operating System
17" Ultimate
Precision M6800	Sep 2013	3.57 kg (7.9 lb)	G3	Intel Core i5 (4200M, 4300M), i7 (4600M, 4700MQ, 4800MQ, 4810MQ, 4900MQ, 4910MQ, 4930MX, 4940MX)	Intel QM87	32 GB (4 slots for 4 cores); 16 GB (2 slots for 2 cores); DDR3L 1600 MHz (or 16 GB of 1866 MHz)	Intel HD 4600 + AMD FirePro M6100 (2 GB GDDR5) or Nvidia Quadro; K3100M (4 GB GDDR5) or K4100M (4 GB GDDR5) or K5100M (8 GB GDDR5)	2+1 2.5" SATA + 1 mSATA	17.3"; 1600×900 TN; 1920×1080 TN			
Precision M6800	Along with the M4800 the last Precision Mobile Workstations with upgradeable processors. IPS panel option dropped; also eDP connector don't factory fitted on a motherboard											
Precision M6700	Aug 2012	3.42 kg (7.5 lb)	G2	Intel Core i5 (3360M, 3320M), Core i7 (3920XM, 3520M, 3820QM, 3720QM)	Intel QM77	32 GB (4 slots for 4 cores); 16 GB (2 slots for 2 cores); DDR3L 1600 MHz (or 16 GB of 1866 MHz)	Intel HD 4000 + AMD FirePro M6000 (2 GB GDDR5) or Nvidia Quadro; K3000M (2 GB GDDR5) or K4000M (4 GB GDDR5) or K5000M (4 GB GDDR5)	2+1 2.5" SATA + 1 mSATA	17.3"; 1600×900 TN; 1920×1080 TN (opt. 10-point multitouch); 1920x1080 IPS RGBLED			
Precision M6700	First model with 3D display, nVidia 3D Vision Pro support. Only two memory slots usable with dual-core CPUs (slots under keyboard are blanked off with a plastic spacer). Last Precision with a RGBLED display option											
Precision M6600	May 2011	3.42 kg (7.5 lb)	G2	Intel Core i5 (2540M, 2520M), i7 (2620M, 2720QM, 2820QM, 2920XM)	Intel QM67	32 GB (4 slots for 4 cores); 16 GB (2 slots for 2 cores); DDR3 1600 MHz	Intel HD 3000 (Note: Disabled with 10-bit RGBLED IPS panel) + AMD FirePro M8900 (2 GB GDDR5) or Nvidia Quadro; 3000M (2 GB GDDR5) or 4000M (2 GB GDDR5) or 5010M (4 GB GDDR5)	2+1 2.5" SATA + 1 mSATA	17.3"; 1600х900 TN; 1920x1080 TN (opt. 4-point touch); 1920x1080 IPS RGBLED			
Precision M6600	First Precision with MXM slot and IPS display option											
Precision M6500	Dec 2009	3.81 kg (8.4 lb)	Socket G1	Intel Core i5 (560M, 580M), i7 (640M, 740QM, 840QM, 920XM, 940XM)	Intel PM55	32 GB (4 slots for 4-core CPUs); 8 GB (2 slots for 2-core CPUs) DDR3 1333 MHz	ATI FirePro M7820 / M7740 (1 GB) or Nvidia Quadro; FX 2800M / FX 3800M (1 GB) or 5000M (Note: The Quadro 5000M has ECC VRAM which when enabled cuts available VRAM to 1792MiB. It is also very uncommon) (2 GB)	2 2.5" SATA + 1 mSATA	16:10 aspect ratio 17"; 1440x900 TN 1920x1200 TN LED; 1920x1200 TN RGBLED			
Precision M6500	There is a fairly common complaint about Nvidia GPU equipped M6500's freezing or locking up on a black/blue screen, which can be attributed to various faulty components, although one workaround is to disable PowerMizer. Complaints about the touchpad malfunctioning have also been noted. First Precision with a mSATA slot and USB 3.0. Covet Edition available, last Covet Edition to use the Burnt Orange colored case. Dual-core models only have two memory slots, Quad-core models have four. i7-QM/XM equipped M6500's with a two DIMM slot motherboard support a maximum of 16 GB RAM.											
Precision M6400	Sept 2008	3.87 kg (8.5 lb)	Socket P	Intel; Core 2 Duo/Extreme/Quad	Intel Q43	16 GB DDR3 1066 (4 slots)	Nvidia Quadro; FX 2700M (512 MB) or FX 3700M (1 GB) or ATI FirePro M7740	2 2.5" SATA	16:10 aspect ratio 17"; 1440x900 TN; 1920x1200 TN CCFL; 1920x1200 RGBLED			
Precision M6400	Covet Edition variant available with edge-to-edge display and Burnt Orange colored case											
15" Ultimate
Precision M4800	Oct 2013	2.88 kg (6.3 lb)	G3	Intel Core i7 (4600M, 4700MQ, 4800MQ, 4810MQ, 4900MQ, 4910MQ, 4930MX, 4940MX); Core i5 (4200M, 4300M)	Intel QM87	32 GB (4 slots for 4 cores); 16 GB (2 slots for 2 cores); DDR3L 1600 MHz (or 16 GB of 1866 MHz)	Intel HD 4600 +AMD FirePro M5100 (2 GB GDDR5) or Nvidia Quadro; K1100M (2 GB GDDR5) or K2100M (2 GB GDDR5)	1+1 2.5" SATA + 1 mSATA	15.6"; 1920x1080 QHD 3200*1800 IGZO Sharp from 2014 UHD 3840x2160 IGZO Sharp			
Precision M4800	QHD and UHD models have a disabled iGPU.											
Precision M4700	Aug 2012	2.87 kg (6.3 lb)	G2	Intel Core i7 (3940XM, 3920XM, 3840QM, 3820QM, 3740QM, 3720QM, 3520M); Core i5 (3360M, 3320M)	Intel QM77	32 GB (4 slots for 4 cores); 16 GB (2 slots for 2 cores); DDR3L 1600 MHz (or 16 GB of 1866 MHz)	Intel HD 4000 +AMD FirePro M4000 (1 GB GDDR5) or Nvidia Quadro; K1000M (2 GB DDR3 (Note: Nvidia uses DDR3 memory instead of GDDR5 memory which reduces performance in exchange for power savings)) or K2000M (2 GB DDR3)	1+1 2.5" SATA + 1 mSATA	15.6"; 1366x768 TN; 1920х1080 TN			
Precision M4700	Only two memory connectors with Intel Core i5-3320M/3360M or Intel Core i7-3520M.											
Precision M4600	May 2011	2.87 kg (6.3 lb)	G2	Intel Core i5 (2540M, 2520M), i7 (2620M, 2720QM, 2820QM, 2920XM)	Intel QM67	32 GB (4 slots for 4 cores); 16 GB (2 slots for 2 cores); DDR3 1600 MHz	Intel HD 3000 + AMD FirePro M5950 (1 GB GDDR5) or Nvidia Quadro; 1000M (2 GB GDDR5) or 2000M (2 GB DDR3)	1+1 2.5" SATA + 1 mSATA	15.6"; 1366x768 TN (opt. touch); 1920х1080 TN; 1920х1080 IPS RGBLED			
Precision M4500	May 2010	2.73 kg (6.0 lb)	Socket G1	Intel Core i5/i7 Clarksfield/Arrandale	Intel QM57	16 GB (4 cores); 8 GB (2 cores); DDR3 1333 MHz (2 slots)	Nvidia Quadro FX 880M / 1800M (1 GB DDR3)	1+1 2.5" SATA + 1 mSATA	15.6"; 1366х768 TN; 1600x900 1920х1080			
Precision M4500	First Precision with a 16:9 display; based on the Latitude E6510 chassis											
Precision M4400	Aug 2008	2.69 kg (5.9 lb)	Socket P	Core 2 Duo/Extreme/Quad; Penryn/Penryn XE/Penryn-QC	Intel PM45	8 GB DDR2 800 MHz (2 slots)	Nvidia Quadro; FX 770M 512 MB or 1700M 512 MB	1+1 2.5" SATA	16:10 aspect ratio 15.4" 1920x1200 RGBLED 1920x1200 CCFL 1440x900 WLED 1280x800 CCFL			
Precision M4400	Same chassis as the Latitude E6500, FX 1700M is in fact an overclocked 770M											
Entry-level
Precision M2800	May 2014	2.9 kg (6.4 lb)	G3	Intel Core i5-4200M, i7-4610M, i7-4810MQ	Intel QM87	16 GB DDR3L 1600 MHz (2 slots)	Intel HD 4600 + AMD FirePro W4170M	1+1 2.5" SATA + 1 mSATA	15.6"			
Precision M2800	Identical case to the Latitude E6540											
Precision M2400	Aug 2008	2.4 kg (5.3 lb)	Socket P	Intel Core 2 Duo; Penryn	Intel PM45	8 GB DDR2 800 MHz (2 slots)	Nvidia Quadro FX 370M	1 2.5" SATA	16:10 aspect ratio 14.1"; 1280x800 1440x900			
Precision M2400	Based on Latitude E6400											

=== Latitude D Series based (2003–2007) ===
These Precision models were released at roughly the same time as their D-series Latitude counterparts. They are compatible with the D-series docking stations, and there are various accessories that are interchangeable with other Dell models, such as the battery or CD drive, depending on the Precision model. Some of these models (especially those made around ~2005-2007) with Nvidia GPUs can suffer from GPU failure.

Model	Release	Weight	CPU Socket	CPU	Chipset	Memory ^{(max)}	Graphics	Storage	Notes	Audio	Screen	Battery	Operating System
17"
Precision M6300	Aug 2007	3.8 kg (8.4 lb)	Socket P	Intel Core 2 Duo Merom/Merom XE; Penryn/Penryn XE	Intel 965PM	8 GB DDR2 667 MHz (2 slots)	Nvidia Quadro; FX 1600M 256 MB or FX 3600M 512 MB	1 2.5" SATA	Shares the same design as the Precision M90	HD Audio with built-in stereo speakers and microphone	17"		
Precision M90	2006	3.9 kg (8.6 lb)	Socket M	Merom	Intel 945PM	3.25 (Note: chipset limits usable RAM to 3.25 GB (2x2 GB modules)) GB DDR2-533/667	Nvidia Quadro FX 3500M / 2500M 512 MB / 1500M 256 MB	1 2.5" SATA	Based on Inspiron E1705/9400; The E1705/9400 does not support a docking station. The M90 supports the D-Series docking stations (PR01X or PD01X)	HD Audio with built-in stereo speakers, subwoofer and microphone	17"	Warning icon	
15.4"
Precision M4300	2007	2.8 kg (6.2 lb)	Socket P	Intel Core 2 Duo Merom/Penryn	Intel 965PM	8 GB DDR2 667 MHz	Nvidia Quadro FX 360M 256 MB	1 2.5" SATA	Based on Latitude D830	Sigmatel STAC9205 with built-in stereo speakers and microphone	15.4"		
Precision M65	2006	2.8 kg (6.2 lb)	Socket M	Merom	Intel 945PM	3.25 GB DDR2-533/667	Nvidia Quadro FX 350M 512 MB	1 2.5" SATA	Based on Latitude D820	Sigmatel STAC9200 with built-in stereo speakers and microphone	15.4"		
Precision M70	2005	3.03 kg (6.7 lb)	Socket 479	Dothan	Intel 915PM	2 GB DDR2-400/533	Nvidia Quadro FX Go1400 (Note: GPU failure is not uncommon on this model)	1 2.5" IDE	Based on Latitude D810, textured "Precision" lid	Sigmatel STAC9751 with built-in stereo speakers and microphone	15.4"	Warning icon	
Precision M60	2003	3.1 kg (6.8 lb)	Socket 479	Banias	Intel 855PM	2 GB DDR	Nvidia Quadro FX Go700 / Quadro FX Go 1000	1 2.5" IDE	Based on Latitude D800, first D-Series based Precision and first Widescreen model	Intel AC97 with built-in stereo speakers and microphone	15.4"	Warning icon	Windows XP
14.1"
Precision M2300	2007	2.4 kg (5.3 lb)	Socket P	Intel Core 2 Duo Merom/Penryn	Intel 965PM	8 GB DDR2 667 MHz	Nvidia Quadro FX 360M	1 2.5" SATA	Based on Latitude D630	IDT STAC9205	14.1"		
Precision M20	2005	2.21 kg (4.9 lb)	Socket 479	Dothan	Intel 915PM	2 GB DDR2-400/533	ATI FireGL V3100	1 2.5" IDE	Based on Latitude D610, first 14" PMW and first one with ATI FireGL GPU. Last Precision with a 4:3 screen		14.1"	Warning icon	

=== Latitude C Series based (2001–2002) ===
These Precisions were based on the Latitude C810 and C840, which in turn were based on the Inspiron 8100 and 8200.

Model	Release	Weight	CPU Socket	CPU	Chipset	Memory ^{(max)}	Graphics	Storage	Notes	Audio	Screen	Battery	Operating System
Precision M50	2002	3.86 kg (8.5 lb)	Socket 478	Northwood	Intel 845 MP	1 GB DDR 266 MHz	Nvidia Quadro4 GoGL 500/700	1+2 2.5" IDE	Latitude C840/Inspiron 8200 based	Crystal CS4205	4:3 aspect ratio 15.0" 1600x1200 TN		Windows XP
Precision M40	Nov 2001	3.57 kg (7.9 lb)	Socket 479	Tualatin	Intel 815	512 MB (Note: Chipset limits maximum RAM to 512MB (2x256 or 1x512 SDRAM 133 MHz)) SDRAM 133 MHz	Nvidia Quadro2 Go	1+2 2.5" IDE	Latitude C810/Inspiron 8100 based, first Precision Mobile Workstation		4:3 aspect ratio 15.0" 1600×1200 TN		

== See also ==
- Lenovo ThinkStation
- Fujitsu Celsius
- Mac Pro
- HP Z
