= List of Intel Xeon processors (Nehalem-based) =

== Xeon 3000-series (uniprocessor) ==
=== "Lynnfield" (45 nm) ===
- Based on Nehalem microarchitecture
- Uni-processor only
- Designed for entry-level servers and entry-level workstations
- All models except X3430 support Hyper-Threading
- All models support: MMX, XD bit, SSE, SSE2, SSE3, SSSE3, SSE4.1, SSE4.2, Intel 64, SpeedStep, Turbo Boost, Smart Cache, VT-x, EPT, VT-d, TXT, ECC
- Die size: 296 mm^{2}
- Steppings: B1

Model number	sSpec number	Frequency	Turbo	Cores	L2 cache	L3 cache	I/O bus	Mult.	Memory	Voltage	TDP	Socket	Release date	Part number(s)	Release price (USD)
Quad Core
Xeon X3430	SLBLJ (B1)	2.4 GHz	1/1/2/3	4	4 × 256 KB	8 MB	DMI	18×	2 × DDR3-1333	0.65–1.40 V	95 W	LGA 1156	September 8, 2009	BX80605X3430; BV80605001914AG	$189
Xeon X3440	SLBLF (B1)	2.53 GHz	1/1/2/3	4	4 × 256 KB	8 MB	DMI	19×	2 × DDR3-1333	0.65–1.40 V	95 W	LGA 1156	September 8, 2009	BX80605X3440; BV80605002517AQ	$215
Xeon X3450	SLBLD (B1)	2.67 GHz	1/1/4/4	4	4 × 256 KB	8 MB	DMI	20×	2 × DDR3-1333	0.65–1.40 V	95 W	LGA 1156	September 8, 2009	BX80605X3450; BV80605001911AQ	$241
Xeon X3460	SLBJK (B1)	2.8 GHz	1/1/4/5	4	4 × 256 KB	8 MB	DMI	21×	2 × DDR3-1333	0.65–1.40 V	95 W	LGA 1156	September 8, 2009	BX80605X3460; BV80605001908AL	$316
Xeon X3470	SLBJH (B1)	2.93 GHz	2/2/4/5	4	4 × 256 KB	8 MB	DMI	22×	2 × DDR3-1333	0.65–1.40 V	95 W	LGA 1156	September 8, 2009	BX80605X3470; BV80605001905AJ	$589
Xeon X3480	SLBPT (B1)	3.07 GHz	2/2/4/5	4	4 × 256 KB	8 MB	DMI	23×	2 × DDR3-1333	0.65–1.40 V	95 W	LGA 1156	May 30, 2010	BX80605X3480; BV80605002505AH	$612
Quad Core, low voltage
Xeon L3426	SLBN3 (B1)	1.87 GHz	2/2/9/10	4	4 × 256 KB	8 MB	DMI	14×	2 × DDR3-1333	0.65–1.40 V	45 W	LGA 1156	September 8, 2009	BX80605L3426; BV80605004737AA	$284

=== "Bloomfield" (45 nm) ===
- Based on Nehalem microarchitecture
- Uni-processor only
- Designed for mid-range uniprocessor workstations
- Quad-core models support: Hyper-Threading, Turbo Boost
- All models support: MMX, XD bit, SSE, SSE2, SSE3, SSSE3, SSE4.1, SSE4.2, Intel 64, SpeedStep, Smart Cache, VT-x, EPT, ECC
- Die size: 263 mm^{2}
- Steppings: D0

Model number	sSpec number	Frequency	Turbo	Cores	L2 cache	L3 cache	I/O bus	Mult.	Memory	Voltage	TDP	Socket	Release date	Part number(s)	Release price (USD)
Dual Core
Xeon W3503	SLBGD (D0)	2.4 GHz	—N/a	2	2× 256 KB	4 MB	1 × 4.8 GT/s QPI	18×	3 × DDR3-1066	0.8–1.225 V	130 W	LGA 1366	March 30, 2009	AT80601002868AA	OEM
Xeon W3505	SLBGC (D0)	2.53 GHz	—N/a	2	2× 256 KB	4 MB	1 × 4.8 GT/s QPI	19×	3 × DDR3-1066	0.8–1.225 V	130 W	LGA 1366	March 30, 2009	AT80601002865AA	OEM
Quad Core
Xeon W3520	SLBEW (D0)	2.67 GHz	1/1/1/2	4	4 × 256 KB	8 MB	1 × 4.8 GT/s QPI	20×	3 × DDR3-1066	0.8–1.375 V	130 W	LGA 1366	March 30, 2009	AT80601000741AB	$284
Xeon W3530	SLBKR (D0)	2.8 GHz	1/1/1/2	4	4 × 256 KB	8 MB	1 × 4.8 GT/s QPI	21×	3 × DDR3-1066	0.8–1.375 V	130 W	LGA 1366	March 16, 2010	AT80601000897AB	$294
Xeon W3540	SLBEX (D0)	2.93 GHz	1/1/1/2	4	4 × 256 KB	8 MB	1 × 4.8 GT/s QPI	22×	3 × DDR3-1066	0.8–1.375 V	130 W	LGA 1366	March 30, 2009	AT80601000921AB	$562
Xeon W3550	SLBEY (D0)	3.07 GHz	1/1/1/2	4	4 × 256 KB	8 MB	1 × 4.8 GT/s QPI	23×	3 × DDR3-1066	0.8–1.375 V	130 W	LGA 1366	August 9, 2009	AT80601002112AB	$562
Xeon W3565	SLBEV (D0)	3.2 GHz	1/1/1/2	4	4 × 256 KB	8 MB	1 × 4.8 GT/s QPI	24×	3 × DDR3-1066	0.8–1.225 V	130 W	LGA 1366	November 1, 2009	AT80601002727AB	$562
Xeon W3570	SLBES (D0)	3.2 GHz	1/1/1/2	4	4 × 256 KB	8 MB	1 × 6.4 GT/s QPI	24×	3 × DDR3-1333	0.8–1.375 V	130 W	LGA 1366	March 30, 2009	AT80601000918AB	$999
Xeon W3580	SLBET (D0)	3.33 GHz	1/1/1/2	4	4 × 256 KB	8 MB	1 × 6.4 GT/s QPI	25×	3 × DDR3-1333	0.8–1.375 V	130 W	LGA 1366	August 9, 2009	AT80601002274AB	$999

=== "Jasper Forest" (45 nm) ===
- Based on Nehalem microarchitecture
- Uni-processor only
- LC3528 supports: Hyper-Threading, Turbo Boost
- All models support: MMX, XD bit, SSE, SSE2, SSE3, SSSE3, SSE4.1, SSE4.2, Intel 64, SpeedStep, Smart Cache, VT-x, EPT, VT-d, ECC
- Die size: 263 mm^{2}
- Steppings: B0

Model number	sSpec number	Frequency	Turbo	Cores	L2 cache	L3 cache	I/O bus	Mult.	Memory	Voltage	TDP	Socket	Release date	Part number(s)	Release price (USD)
Single Core, low voltage
Xeon LC3518	SLBWH (B0)	1.73 GHz	—N/a	1	1 × 256 KB	2 MB	DMI	13×	2× DDR3-800	0.75–1.35 V	23 W	LGA 1366	February 11, 2010	AT80612002946AA	$192
Dual Core, low voltage
Xeon LC3528	SLBWG (B0)	1.73 GHz	1866 MHz	2	2 × 256 KB	4 MB	DMI	13×	2× DDR3-800	0.75–1.35 V	35 W	LGA 1366	February 11, 2010	AT80612002931AB	$302
Quad Core
Xeon EC3539	SLBWJ (B0)	2.13 GHz	—N/a	4	4 × 256 KB	8 MB	DMI	16×	3 × DDR3-1066	0.75–1.35 V	65 W	LGA 1366	February 11, 2010	AT80612003090AA	$302

=== "Clarkdale" (MCP, 32 nm) ===
- Based on Westmere microarchitecture
- Uni-processor only
- Designed for entry-level servers and entry-level workstations
- L3406 supports Hyper-Threading, Turbo Boost
- All models support: MMX, XD bit, SSE, SSE2, SSE3, SSSE3, SSE4.1, SSE4.2, Intel 64, SpeedStep, Smart Cache, VT-x, EPT, VT-d, TXT, ECC
- Die size: 81 mm^{2} (CPU Component)
- Steppings: C2

Model number	sSpec number	Frequency	Turbo	GPU frequency	Cores	L2 cache	L3 cache	I/O bus	Mult.	Memory	Voltage	TDP	Socket	Release date	Part number(s)	Release price (USD)
Dual Core, low voltage
Xeon L3403	SLBT9 (K0); SLBRX (C2)	2 GHz	—N/a	—N/a	2	2 × 256 KB	4 MB	DMI	15×	2 × DDR3-1066	0.65–1.40 V	30 W	LGA 1156	October 2010	CM80616005496AB	OEM
Xeon L3406	SLBT8 (K0); SLBQQ (C2)	2.27 GHz	2.53 GHz	—N/a	2	2 × 256 KB	4 MB	DMI	17×	2 × DDR3-1066	0.65–1.40 V	30 W	LGA 1156	March 16, 2010	CM80616005010AA; BX80616L3406	$189

=== "Gulftown" (32 nm) ===
- Based on Westmere microarchitecture
- Uniprocessor-only systems
- Designed for mid-range uniprocessor workstations
- All models support: MMX, XD bit, SSE, SSE2, SSE3, SSSE3, SSE4.1, SSE4.2, Intel 64, Hyper-Threading, AES-NI, SpeedStep, Turbo Boost, Smart Cache, VT-x, EPT, VT-d, TXT, ECC
- Die size: 240 mm^{2}
- Steppings: B1

Model number	sSpec number	Frequency	Turbo	Cores	L2 cache	L3 cache	I/O bus	Mult.	Memory	Voltage	TDP	Socket	Release date	Part number(s)	Release price (USD)
Six Core
Xeon W3670	SLBVE (B1)	3.2 GHz	1/1/1/1/2/2	6	6 × 256 KB	12 MB	1 × 4.8 GT/s QPI	24×	3 × DDR3-1066	0.8–1.375 V	130 W	LGA 1366	August 29, 2010	AT80613005490AC; BX80613W3670	$885
Xeon W3680	SLBV2 (B1)	3.33 GHz	1/1/1/1/2/2	6	6 × 256 KB	12 MB	1 × 6.4 GT/s QPI	25×	3 × DDR3-1333	0.8–1.375 V	130 W	LGA 1366	March 16, 2010	AT80613003543AF; BX80613W3680	$999
Xeon W3690	SLBW2 (B1)	3.47 GHz	1/1/1/1/2/2	6	6 × 256 KB	12 MB	1 × 6.4 GT/s QPI	26×	3 × DDR3-1333	0.8–1.375 V	130 W	LGA 1366	February 14, 2011	AT80613005931AB; BX80613W3690	$999

== Xeon 5000-series (dual-processor) ==
=== "Nehalem-EP (Gainestown)" (45 nm) Efficient Performance ===
- Based on Nehalem microarchitecture
- All models support: MMX, SSE, SSE2, SSE3, SSSE3, SSE4.1, SSE4.2, Demand-Based Switching (Intel's Server EIST), Intel 64, XD bit (an NX bit implementation), Intel VT-x, Intel EPT, Intel VT-d, Intel VT-c, Intel x8 SDDC
- All models support: Hyper-Threading, Turbo Boost except E5502, E5503, E5504, E5506, L5506, E5507
- All models support dual-processor configurations
- Designed for mainstream dual-processor servers and high-end dual-processor workstations
- Die size: 263 mm^{2}
- Steppings: D0

Model number	sSpec number	Frequency	Turbo	Cores	L2 cache	L3 cache	I/O bus	Mult.	Memory	Voltage	TDP	Socket	Release date	Part number(s)	Release price (USD)
Dual Core
Xeon E5502	SLBEZ (D0)	1.87 GHz	—N/a	2	2× 256 KB	4 MB	2 × 4.8 GT/s QPI	14×	3 × DDR3-800	0.75–1.35 V	80 W	LGA 1366	March 30, 2009	AT80602000804AA	$188
Xeon E5503	SLBKD (D0)	2 GHz	—N/a	2	2× 256 KB	4 MB	2 × 4.8 GT/s QPI	15×	3 × DDR3-800	0.75–1.35 V	80 W	LGA 1366	March 16, 2010	AT80602003636AA	$224
Dual Core, low voltage
Xeon L5508	SLBGK (D0)	2 GHz	2/3	2	2× 256 KB	8 MB	2 × 5.86 GT/s QPI	15×	3 × DDR3-1066	0.75–1.35 V	38 W	LGA 1366	March 30, 2009	AT80602002697AC	$440
Quad Core
Xeon E5504	SLBF9 (D0)	2 GHz	—N/a	4	4 × 256 KB	4 MB	2 × 4.8 GT/s QPI	15×	3 × DDR3-800	0.75–1.35 V	80 W	LGA 1366	March 30, 2009	AT80602000801AA	$224
Xeon E5506	SLBF8 (D0)	2.13 GHz	—N/a	4	4 × 256 KB	4 MB	2 × 4.8 GT/s QPI	16×	3 × DDR3-800	0.75–1.35 V	80 W	LGA 1366	March 30, 2009	AT80602000798AA	$266
Xeon E5507	SLBKC (D0)	2.27 GHz	—N/a	4	4 × 256 KB	4 MB	2 × 4.8 GT/s QPI	17×	3 × DDR3-800	0.75–1.35 V	80 W	LGA 1366	March 16, 2010	AT80602000795AA	$266
Xeon E5520	SLBFD (D0)	2.27 GHz	1/1/1/2	4	4 × 256 KB	8 MB	2 × 5.86 GT/s QPI	17×	3 × DDR3-1066	0.75–1.35 V	80 W	LGA 1366	March 30, 2009	AT80602002091AA	$373
Xeon E5530	SLBF7 (D0)	2.4 GHz	1/1/1/2	4	4 × 256 KB	8 MB	2 × 5.86 GT/s QPI	18×	3 × DDR3-1066	0.75–1.35 V	80 W	LGA 1366	March 30, 2009	AT80602000792AA	$530
Xeon E5540	SLBF6 (D0)	2.53 GHz	1/1/1/2	4	4 × 256 KB	8 MB	2 × 5.86 GT/s QPI	19×	3 × DDR3-1066	0.75–1.35 V	80 W	LGA 1366	March 30, 2009	AT80602000789AA	$774
Xeon X5550	SLBF5 (D0)	2.67 GHz	2/2/3/3	4	4 × 256 KB	8 MB	2 × 6.4 GT/s QPI	20×	3 × DDR3-1333	0.75–1.35 V	95 W	LGA 1366	March 30, 2009	AT80602000771AA	$958
Xeon X5560	SLBF4 (D0)	2.8 GHz	2/2/3/3	4	4 × 256 KB	8 MB	2 × 6.4 GT/s QPI	21×	3 × DDR3-1333	0.75–1.35 V	95 W	LGA 1366	March 30, 2009	AT80602000768AA	$1172
Xeon X5570	SLBF3 (D0)	2.93 GHz	2/2/3/3	4	4 × 256 KB	8 MB	2 × 6.4 GT/s QPI	22×	3 × DDR3-1333	0.75–1.35 V	95 W	LGA 1366	March 30, 2009	AT80602000765AA	$1386
Xeon W5580	SLBF2 (D0)	3.2 GHz	1/1/1/2	4	4 × 256 KB	8 MB	2 × 6.4 GT/s QPI	24×	3 × DDR3-1333	0.75–1.35 V	130 W	LGA 1366	March 30, 2009	AT80602000756AD	$1600
Xeon W5590	SLBGE (D0)	3.33 GHz	1/1/1/2	4	4 × 256 KB	8 MB	2 × 6.4 GT/s QPI	25×	3 × DDR3-1333	0.75–1.35 V	130 W	LGA 1366	August 9, 2009	AT80602000753AA	$1600
Quad Core, low voltage
Xeon L5506	SLBFH (D0)	2.13 GHz	—N/a	4	4 × 256 KB	4 MB	2 × 4.8 GT/s QPI	16×	3 × DDR3-800	0.75–1.35 V	60 W	LGA 1366	March 30, 2009	AT80602002712AA	$423
Xeon L5518	SLBFW (D0)	2.13 GHz	1/1/1/2	4	4 × 256 KB	8 MB	2 × 5.86 GT/s QPI	16×	3 × DDR3-1066	0.75–1.35 V	60 W	LGA 1366	March 30, 2009	AT80602002265AB	$551
Xeon L5520	SLBFA (D0)	2.27 GHz	1/1/1/2	4	4 × 256 KB	8 MB	2 × 5.86 GT/s QPI	17×	3 × DDR3-1066	0.75–1.35 V	60 W	LGA 1366	March 30, 2009	AT80602000810AA	$530
Xeon L5530	SLBGF (D0)	2.4 GHz	1/1/1/2	4	4 × 256 KB	8 MB	2 × 5.86 GT/s QPI	18×	3 × DDR3-1066	0.75–1.35 V	60 W	LGA 1366	August 9, 2009	AT80602002927AB	$744

=== "Jasper Forest-DP" (45 nm) ===
- Based on Nehalem microarchitecture
- All models support: MMX, SSE, SSE2, SSE3, SSSE3, SSE4.1, SSE4.2, Demand-Based Switching (Intel's Server EIST), Intel 64, XD bit (an NX bit implementation), Intel VT-x, Intel EPT, Intel VT-d, Intel VT-c, Intel x8 SDDC
- EC5549, LC5528, and LC5518 support: Hyper-Threading, Turbo Boost
- Dual-socket configurations supported
- Die size: 263 mm^{2}
- Steppings: B0

Model number	sSpec number	Frequency	Turbo	Cores	L2 cache	L3 cache	I/O bus	Mult.	Memory	Voltage	TDP	Socket	Release date	Part number(s)	Release price (USD)
Dual Core
Xeon EC5539	SLBWL (B0)	2.27 GHz	—N/a	2	2 × 256 KB	4 MB	1 × 5.86 GT/s QPI	17×	3 × DDR3-1333	0.75–1.35 V	65 W	LGA 1366	February 12, 2010	AT80612003861AB	$388
Quad Core
Xeon EC5509	SLBWM (B0)	2 GHz	—N/a	4	4 × 256 KB	8 MB	1 × 4.8 GT/s QPI	15×	3 × DDR3-1066	0.75–1.35 V	85 W	LGA 1366	February 12, 2010	AT80612004740AA	$266
Xeon EC5549	SLBWP (B0)	2.53 GHz	2933 MHz	4	4 × 256 KB	8 MB	1 × 5.86 GT/s QPI	19×	3 × DDR3-1333	0.75–1.35 V	85 W	LGA 1366	February 12, 2010	AT80612005712AB	$530
Quad Core, low voltage
Xeon LC5518	SLBWF (B0)	1.73 GHz	2133 MHz	4	4 × 256 KB	8 MB	1 × 4.8 GT/s QPI	13×	3 × DDR3-1066	0.75–1.35 V	48 W	LGA 1366	February 12, 2010	AT80612002928AC	$519
Xeon LC5528	SLBWK (B0)	2.13 GHz	2533 MHz	4	4 × 256 KB	8 MB	1 × 4.8 GT/s QPI	16×	3 × DDR3-1066	0.75–1.35 V	60 W	LGA 1366	February 12, 2010	AT80612003858AA	$519

=== "Westmere-EP" (32 nm) Efficient Performance ===
- Based on Westmere microarchitecture
- All models support: MMX, SSE, SSE2, SSE3, SSSE3, SSE4.1, SSE4.2, Enhanced Intel SpeedStep Technology (EIST), Intel 64, XD bit (an NX bit implementation), TXT, Intel VT-x, Intel EPT, Intel VT-d, Intel VT-c, Intel x8 SDDC, AES-NI, Smart Cache, Hyper-Threading, Turbo Boost except E5603, E5606, E5607, L5609
- Dual-socket configurations supported
- Designed for mainstream dual-processor servers and high-end dual-processor workstations
- Die size: 240 mm^{2}
- Steppings: B1

Model number	sSpec number	Frequency	Turbo	Cores	L2 cache	L3 cache	I/O bus	Mult.	Memory	Voltage	TDP	Socket	Release date	Part number(s)	Release price (USD)
Dual Core
Xeon X5698	SLC32 (B1)	4.4 GHz	0/1	2	2 × 256 KB	12 MB	2 × 6.4 GT/s QPI	33×	3 × DDR3-1333	0.75–1.35 V	130 W	LGA 1366	Q1, 2011	AT80614007314AA	OEM
Quad Core
Xeon E5603	SLC2F (B1)	1.6 GHz	—N/a	4	4 × 256 KB	4 MB	2 × 4.8 GT/s QPI	12×	3 × DDR3-1066	0.75–1.35 V	80 W	LGA 1366	February 14, 2011	AT80614006954AA; BX80614E5603	$188
Xeon E5606	SLC2N (B1)	2.13 GHz	—N/a	4	4 × 256 KB	8 MB	2 × 4.8 GT/s QPI	16×	3 × DDR3-1066	0.75–1.35 V	80 W	LGA 1366	February 14, 2011	AT80614007290AE; BX80614E5606	$219
Xeon E5607	SLBZ9 (B1)	2.27 GHz	—N/a	4	4 × 256 KB	8 MB	2 × 4.8 GT/s QPI	17×	3 × DDR3-1066	0.75–1.35 V	80 W	LGA 1366	February 14, 2011	AT80614006789AA; BX80614E5607	$276
Xeon E5620	SLBV4 (B1)	2.4 GHz	1/1/2/2	4	4 × 256 KB	12 MB	2 × 5.86 GT/s QPI	18×	3 × DDR3-1066	0.75–1.35 V	80 W	LGA 1366	March 16, 2010	AT80614005073AB; BX80614E5620	$387
Xeon E5630	SLBVB (B1)	2.53 GHz	1/1/2/2	4	4 × 256 KB	12 MB	2 × 5.86 GT/s QPI	19×	3 × DDR3-1066	0.75–1.35 V	80 W	LGA 1366	March 16, 2010	AT80614005463AA; BX80614E5630	$551
Xeon E5640	SLBVC (B1)	2.67 GHz	1/1/2/2	4	4 × 256 KB	12 MB	2 × 5.86 GT/s QPI	20×	3 × DDR3-1066	0.75–1.35 V	80 W	LGA 1366	March 16, 2010	AT80614005466AA; BX80614E5640	$774
Xeon X5647	SLBZ7 (B1)	2.93 GHz	1/1/2/2	4	4 × 256 KB	12 MB	2 × 5.86 GT/s QPI	22×	3 × DDR3-1066	0.75–1.35 V	130 W	LGA 1366	February 14, 2011	AT80614006780AA	$774
Xeon X5667	SLBVA (B1)	3.07 GHz	2/2/3/3	4	4 × 256 KB	12 MB	2 × 6.4 GT/s QPI	23×	3 × DDR3-1333	0.75–1.35 V	95 W	LGA 1366	March 16, 2010	AT80614005154AB	$1440
Xeon X5672	SLBYK (B1)	3.2 GHz	2/2/3/3	4	4 × 256 KB	12 MB	2 × 6.4 GT/s QPI	24×	3 × DDR3-1333	0.75–1.35 V	95 W	LGA 1366	February 14, 2011	AT80614005922AA	$1440
Xeon X5677	SLBV9 (B1)	3.47 GHz	1/1/2/2	4	4 × 256 KB	12 MB	2 × 6.4 GT/s QPI	26×	3 × DDR3-1333	0.75–1.35 V	130 W	LGA 1366	March 16, 2010	AT80614005145AB	$1663
Xeon X5687	SLBVY (B1)	3.6 GHz	1/1/2/2	4	4 × 256 KB	12 MB	2 × 6.4 GT/s QPI	27×	3 × DDR3-1333	0.75–1.35 V	130 W	LGA 1366	February 14, 2011	AT80614005919AB	$1663
Quad Core, low power
Xeon L5609	SLBVJ (B1)	1.87 GHz	—N/a	4	4 × 256 KB	12 MB	2 × 4.8 GT/s QPI	14×	3 × DDR3-1066	0.75–1.35 V	40 W	LGA 1366	March 16, 2010	AT80614005940AA	$440
Xeon L5618	SLBX3 (B1)	1.87 GHz	1/1/2/3	4	4 × 256 KB	12 MB	2 × 5.86 GT/s QPI	14×	3 × DDR3-1066	0.75–1.35 V	40 W	LGA 1366	March 16, 2010	AT80614005079AB	$530
Xeon L5630	SLBVD (B1)	2.13 GHz	1/1/2/2	4	4 × 256 KB	12 MB	2 × 5.86 GT/s QPI	16×	3 × DDR3-1066	0.75–1.35 V	40 W	LGA 1366	March 16, 2010	AT80614005484AA	$551
Six Core
Xeon E5645	SLBWZ (B1)	2.4 GHz	1/1/1/1/2/2	6	6 × 256 KB	12 MB	2 × 5.86 GT/s QPI	18×	3 × DDR3-1333	0.75–1.35 V	80 W	LGA 1366	March 16, 2010	AT80614003597AC	$551
Xeon E5649	SLBZ8 (B1)	2.53 GHz	1/1/2/2/3/3	6	6 × 256 KB	12 MB	2 × 5.86 GT/s QPI	19×	3 × DDR3-1333	0.75–1.35 V	80 W	LGA 1366	February 14, 2011	AT80614006783AB; BX80614E5649	$774
Xeon X5650	SLBV3 (B1)	2.67 GHz	2/2/2/2/3/3	6	6 × 256 KB	12 MB	2 × 6.4 GT/s QPI	20×	3 × DDR3-1333	0.75–1.35 V	95 W	LGA 1366	March 16, 2010	AT80614004320AD; BX80614X5650	$996
Xeon X5660	SLBV6 (B1)	2.8 GHz	2/2/2/2/3/3	6	6 × 256 KB	12 MB	2 × 6.4 GT/s QPI	21×	3 × DDR3-1333	0.75–1.35 V	95 W	LGA 1366	March 16, 2010	AT80614005127AA; BX80614X5660	$1219
Xeon X5670	SLBV7 (B1)	2.93 GHz	2/2/2/2/3/3	6	6 × 256 KB	12 MB	2 × 6.4 GT/s QPI	22×	3 × DDR3-1333	0.75–1.35 V	95 W	LGA 1366	March 16, 2010	AT80614005130AA; BX80614X5670	$1440
Xeon X5675	SLBYL (B1)	3.07 GHz	2/2/2/2/3/3	6	6 × 256 KB	12 MB	2 × 6.4 GT/s QPI	23×	3 × DDR3-1333	0.75–1.35 V	95 W	LGA 1366	February 14, 2011	AT80614006696AA; BX80614X5675	$1440
Xeon X5679	SLC2E (B1)	3.2 GHz	1/1/1/1/2/2	6	6 × 256 KB	12 MB	2 × 6.4 GT/s QPI	24×	3 × DDR3-1066	0.75–1.35 V	115 W	LGA 1366	February 14, 2011	AT80614006924AA	OEM
Xeon X5680	SLBV5 (B1)	3.33 GHz	1/1/1/1/2/2	6	6 × 256 KB	12 MB	2 × 6.4 GT/s QPI	25×	3 × DDR3-1333	0.75–1.35 V	130 W	LGA 1366	March 16, 2010	AT80614005124AA; BX80614X5680	$1663
Xeon X5690	SLBVX (B1)	3.47 GHz	1/1/1/1/2/2	6	6 × 256 KB	12 MB	2 × 6.4 GT/s QPI	26×	3 × DDR3-1333	0.75–1.35 V	130 W	LGA 1366	February 14, 2011	AT80614005913AB; BX80614X5690	$1663
Six Core, low power
Xeon L5638	SLBWY (B1)	2 GHz	1/1/2/2/3/3	6	6 × 256 KB	12 MB	2 × 5.86 GT/s QPI	15×	3 × DDR3-1333	0.75–1.35 V	60 W	LGA 1366	March 16, 2010	AT80614003591AB	$958
Xeon L5639	SLBZJ (B1)	2.13 GHz	2/2/3/3/4/4	6	6 × 256 KB	12 MB	2 × 5.86 GT/s QPI	16×	3 × DDR3-1333	0.75–1.35 V	60 W	LGA 1366	February 14, 2011	AT80614005076AB	OEM
Xeon L5640	SLBV8 (B1)	2.27 GHz	2/2/3/3/4/4	6	6 × 256 KB	12 MB	2 × 5.86 GT/s QPI	17×	3 × DDR3-1333	0.75–1.35 V	60 W	LGA 1366	March 16, 2010	AT80614005133AB; BX80614L5640	$996
Xeon L5645	SLBVW (B1)	2.4 GHz	2/2/3/3/4/4	6	6 × 256 KB	12 MB	2 × 5.86 GT/s QPI	18×	3 × DDR3-1333	0.75–1.35 V	60 W	LGA 1366	February 14, 2011	AT80614005136AB	OEM

== Xeon 7000-series and E7 (multiprocessor) ==
=== "Nehalem-EX (Beckton)" (45 nm) Expandable ===
- Based on Nehalem microarchitecture
- All models support: MMX, SSE, SSE2, SSE3, SSSE3, SSE4.1, SSE4.2, Enhanced Intel SpeedStep Technology (EIST), Intel 64, XD bit (an NX bit implementation), TXT, Intel VT-x, Intel EPT, Intel VT-d, Intel VT-c, Intel x8 SDDC, Turbo Boost, Smart Cache, Hyper-Threading except X7542
- 65xx models support single- and dual-processor configurations, while 75xx models support up to 8-processor configurations
- Transistors: 2.3 billion
- Die size: 684 mm^{2}
- Steppings: D0

Model number	sSpec number	Frequency	Turbo	Cores	L2 cache	L3 cache	I/O bus	Mult.	Memory	Voltage	TDP	Socket	Release date	Part number(s)	Release price (USD)
Quad Core
Xeon E6510	SLBRL (D0)	1.73 GHz	—N/a	4	4× 256 KB	12 MB	4 × 4.8 GT/s QPI	13×	4 × DDR3-1333	0.675–1.35 V	105 W	LGA 1567	March 30, 2010	AT80604004896AA	$744
Xeon E7520	SLBRK (D0)	1.87 GHz	—N/a	4	4× 256 KB	18 MB	4 × 4.8 GT/s QPI	14×	4 × DDR3-1333	0.675–1.35 V	105 W	LGA 1567	March 30, 2010	AT80604004887AA	$856
Six Core
Xeon E7530	SLBRJ (D0)	1.87 GHz	2133 MHz	6	6× 256 KB	12 MB	4 × 5.86 GT/s QPI	14×	4 × DDR3-1333	0.675–1.35 V	105 W	LGA 1567	March 30, 2010	AT80604004884AA	$1391
Xeon E6540	SLBRC (D0)	2 GHz	2266 MHz	6	6× 256 KB	18 MB	4 × 6.4 GT/s QPI	15×	4 × DDR3-1333	0.675–1.35 V	105 W	LGA 1567	March 30, 2010	AT80604001800AB	$1712
Xeon E7540	SLBRG (D0)	2 GHz	2266 MHz	6	6× 256 KB	18 MB	4 × 6.4 GT/s QPI	15×	4 × DDR3-1333	0.675–1.35 V	105 W	LGA 1567	March 30, 2010	AT80604004878AA	$1980
Xeon X7542	SLBRM (D0)	2.67 GHz	2800 MHz	6	6× 256 KB	18 MB	4 × 5.86 GT/s QPI	20×	4 × DDR3-1333	0.675–1.35 V	130 W	LGA 1567	March 30, 2010	AT80604005280AA	$1980
Six Core, low power
Xeon L7545	SLBRH (D0)	1.87 GHz	2533 MHz	6	6× 256 KB	18 MB	4 × 5.86 GT/s QPI	14×	4 × DDR3-1333	0.675–1.35 V	95 W	LGA 1567	March 30, 2010	AT80604004881AA	$2087
Eight Core
Xeon X6550	SLBRB (D0)	2 GHz	2400 MHz	8	8× 256 KB	18 MB	4 × 6.4 GT/s QPI	15×	4 × DDR3-1333	0.675–1.35 V	130 W	LGA 1567	March 30, 2010	AT80604001797AB	$2461
Xeon X7550	SLBRE (D0)	2 GHz	2400 MHz	8	8× 256 KB	18 MB	4 × 6.4 GT/s QPI	15×	4 × DDR3-1333	0.675–1.35 V	130 W	LGA 1567	March 30, 2010	AT80604004872AA	$2729
Xeon X7560	SLBRD (D0)	2.27 GHz	2666 MHz	8	8× 256 KB	24 MB	4 × 6.4 GT/s QPI	17×	4 × DDR3-1333	0.675–1.35 V	130 W	LGA 1567	March 30, 2010	AT80604004869AA	$3692
Eight Core, low power
Xeon L7555	SLBRF (D0)	1.87 GHz	2533 MHz	8	8× 256 KB	24 MB	4 × 5.86 GT/s QPI	14×	4 × DDR3-1333	0.675–1.35 V	95 W	LGA 1567	March 30, 2010	AT80604004875AA	$3157

=== "Westmere-EX" (32 nm) Expandable ===
- Based on Westmere microarchitecture.
- All models support: MMX, SSE, SSE2, SSE3, SSSE3, SSE4.1, SSE4.2, Enhanced Intel SpeedStep Technology (EIST), Intel 64, XD bit (an NX bit implementation), TXT, Intel VT-x, Intel EPT, Intel VT-d, Intel VT-c, Intel DDDC, Hyper-threading (except E7-8837), Turbo Boost, AES-NI, Smart Cache.
- 28xx models support single- and dual-processor configurations, 48xx models support up to four-processor configurations, 88xx models support up to eight-processor configurations.
- Transistors: 2.6 billion
- Die size: 513 mm^{2}
- Steppings: A2

Model number	sSpec number	Frequency	Turbo	Cores	L2 cache	L3 cache	I/O bus	Mult.	Memory	Voltage	TDP	Socket	Release date	Part number(s)	Release price (USD)
Six Core
Xeon E7-2803	SLC3M (A2)	1.73 GHz	—N/a	6	6× 256 KB	18 MB	4 × 4.8 GT/s QPI	13×	4 × DDR3-1333	0.6–1.35 V	105 W	LGA 1567	April 3, 2011	AT80615006438AB	$774
Xeon E7-4807	SLC3L (A2)	1.87 GHz	—N/a	6	6× 256 KB	18 MB	4 × 4.8 GT/s QPI	14×	4 × DDR3-1333	0.6–1.35 V	95 W	LGA 1567	April 3, 2011	AT80615006432AB	$890
Eight Core
Xeon E7-2820	SLC3R (A2)	2 GHz	1/1/1/2	8	8× 256 KB	18 MB	4 × 5.86 GT/s QPI	15×	4 × DDR3-1333	0.6–1.35 V	105 W	LGA 1567	April 3, 2011	AT80615007245AA	$1334
Xeon E7-2830	SLC3J (A2)	2.13 GHz	1/1/1/2	8	8× 256 KB	24 MB	4 × 6.4 GT/s QPI	16×	4 × DDR3-1333	0.6–1.35 V	105 W	LGA 1567	April 3, 2011	AT80615005787AB	$1779
Xeon E7-4820	SLC3G (A2)	2 GHz	1/1/1/2	8	8× 256 KB	18 MB	4 × 5.86 GT/s QPI	15×	4 × DDR3-1333	0.6–1.35 V	105 W	LGA 1567	April 3, 2011	AT80615005772AC	$1446
Xeon E7-4830	SLC3Q (A2)	2.13 GHz	1/1/1/2	8	8× 256 KB	24 MB	4 × 6.4 GT/s QPI	16×	4 × DDR3-1333	0.6–1.35 V	105 W	LGA 1567	April 3, 2011	AT80615007089AA; BX80615E74830	$2059
Xeon E7-8830	SLC3K (A2)	2.13 GHz	1/1/1/2	8	8× 256 KB	24 MB	4 × 6.4 GT/s QPI	16×	4 × DDR3-1333	0.6–1.35 V	105 W	LGA 1567	April 3, 2011	AT80615005826AB	$2280
Xeon E7-8837	SLC3N (A2)	2.67 GHz	1/1/1/1	8	8× 256 KB	24 MB	4 × 6.4 GT/s QPI	20×	4 × DDR3-1333	0.6–1.35 V	130 W	LGA 1567	April 3, 2011	AT80615006750AB	$2280
Ten Core
Xeon E7-2850	SLC3W (A2)	2 GHz	1/1/2/3/3	10	10× 256 KB	24 MB	4 × 6.4 GT/s QPI	15×	4 × DDR3-1333	0.6–1.35 V	130 W	LGA 1567	April 3, 2011	AT80615007452AA	$2558
Xeon E7-2860	SLC3H (A2)	2.27 GHz	1/1/2/3/3	10	10× 256 KB	24 MB	4 × 6.4 GT/s QPI	17×	4 × DDR3-1333	0.6–1.35 V	130 W	LGA 1567	April 3, 2011	AT80615005781AB	$3670
Xeon E7-2870	SLC3U (A2)	2.4 GHz	1/1/2/3/3	10	10× 256 KB	30 MB	4 × 6.4 GT/s QPI	18×	4 × DDR3-1333	0.6–1.35 V	130 W	LGA 1567	April 3, 2011	AT80615007266AA	$4227
Xeon E7-4850	SLC3V (A2)	2 GHz	1/1/2/3/3	10	10× 256 KB	24 MB	4 × 6.4 GT/s QPI	15×	4 × DDR3-1333	0.6–1.35 V	130 W	LGA 1567	April 3, 2011	AT80615007449AA	$2837
Xeon E7-4860	SLC3S (A2)	2.27 GHz	1/1/2/3/3	10	10× 256 KB	24 MB	4 × 6.4 GT/s QPI	17×	4 × DDR3-1333	0.6–1.35 V	130 W	LGA 1567	April 3, 2011	AT80615007254AA	$3838
Xeon E7-4870	SLC3T (A2)	2.4 GHz	1/1/2/3/3	10	10× 256 KB	30 MB	4 × 6.4 GT/s QPI	18×	4 × DDR3-1333	0.6–1.35 V	130 W	LGA 1567	April 3, 2011	AT80615007263AA; BX80615E74870	$4394
Xeon E7-8850	SLC3D (A2)	2 GHz	1/1/2/3/3	10	10× 256 KB	24 MB	4 × 6.4 GT/s QPI	15×	4 × DDR3-1333	0.6–1.35 V	130 W	LGA 1567	April 3, 2011	AT80615007446AA	$3059
Xeon E7-8860	SLC3F (A2)	2.27 GHz	1/1/2/3/3	10	10× 256 KB	24 MB	4 × 6.4 GT/s QPI	17×	4 × DDR3-1333	0.6–1.35 V	130 W	LGA 1567	April 3, 2011	AT80615005760AB	$4061
Xeon E7-8870	SLC3E (A2)	2.4 GHz	1/1/2/3/3	10	10× 256 KB	30 MB	4 × 6.4 GT/s QPI	18×	4 × DDR3-1333	0.6–1.35 V	130 W	LGA 1567	April 3, 2011	AT80615005757AB	$4616
Ten Core, low power
Xeon E7-8867L	SLC3P (A2)	2.13 GHz	1/1/2/3/3	10	10× 256 KB	30 MB	4 × 6.4 GT/s QPI	16×	4 × DDR3-1333	0.6–1.35 V	105 W	LGA 1567	April 3, 2011	AT80615007002AB	$4172
