= LGA 1567 =

Socket LS
- Release date: March 30, 2010; 15 years ago
- Designed by: Intel
- Manufactured by: Intel
- Type: LGA
- Chip form factors: Flip-chip land grid array
- Contacts: 1567
- FSB protocol: Intel QuickPath Interconnect
- FSB frequency: 1× to 4× QuickPath ()6.4 GT/s
- Processor dimensions: 42.5 mm x 42.5 mm
- Processors: Xeon 6500/7500 series (Beckton/Nehalem-EX); Xeon E7 (Westmere-EX)
- Predecessor: Socket 604 (for high-end servers only)
- Variant: LGA 1366 (mid-range servers)
- Successor: LGA 2011-1
- Memory support: DDR3 with ECC support
- This article is part of the CPU socket series

LGA 1567 or Socket LS, is a CPU socket used for the high-end server segment. It has 1567 protruding pins to make contact with the pads on the processor. It supports Intel Nehalem, codenamed Beckton, Xeon 7500 and Xeon 6500 series processors first released in March 2010. The 6500 series is scalable up to 2 sockets, while the 7500 series is scalable up to 4/8 sockets on a supporting motherboard. In this server segment, it is a successor of Socket 604, which was first launched in 2002. A modification of LGA 2011, the LGA 2011-1 or Socket R2, is a successor of LGA 1567.

Later on, the Xeon E7 series using the Westmere-EX architecture reused the same socket.

Dell also manufactures the proprietary "FlexMem Bridge" module that installs into two of the LGA 1567 sockets of certain PowerEdge servers to allow the use of additional memory slots with only two processors installed.

== See also ==
- List of Intel microprocessors
