= Socket 604 =

604-pin microprocessor socket

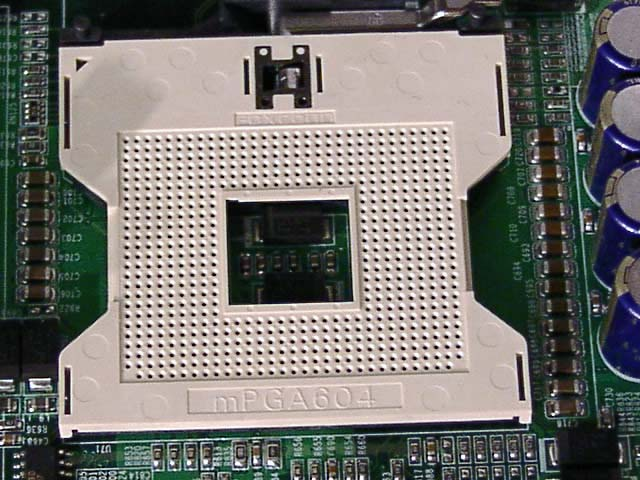
- Release date: 2003
- Designed by: Intel
- Manufactured by: Intel
- Type: PGA-ZIF
- Chip form factors: Pin grid array
- Contacts: 604
- FSB protocol: AGTL+
- FSB frequency: 533 MT/s - 1.07 GT/s
- Processor dimensions: 53.34 mm × 53.34 mm; 42.5 mm × 42.5 mm
- Processors: Intel Xeon
- Predecessor: Socket 603
- Successor: LGA 771 (low- and mid-end servers); LGA 1567 (high-end servers)
- Memory support: DDR; DDR2
- This article is part of the CPU socket series

Socket 604 is a 604-pin microprocessor socket designed to interface an Intel Xeon processor to the rest of the computer. It provides both an electrical interface as well as physical support. This socket is designed to support a heatsink.

Launched on November 18, 2002, over the year after Socket 603, it was originally used to accommodate most Xeons introduced at the time. It was succeeded by LGA 771 in 2006 for low- and mid-end server ranges, but still stayed in the high-end server range, including 4- and 8-processor configurations, in which the successor - LGA 1567 - appeared in 2010. At the time, LGA 1366 was the primary socket for Xeons in low- and mid-end server ranges, with cheaper configurations still sometimes using the LGA 771 socket. The socket had an unusually long life span, lasting 9 years (2 years longer than consumer-grade LGA 775) until the last processors supporting it ceased production in the 3rd quarter of 2011.

== Technical specifications ==
Socket 604 was designed by Intel as a zero insertion force socket intended for workstations and server platforms. While the socket contains 604 pins, it only has 603 electrical contacts, the last being a dummy pin. Each contact has a 1.27mm pitch with regular pin array, to mate with a 604-pin processor package.

Socket 604 processors utilize a bus speed of either 400, 533, 667, 800, or 1066 MHz and were manufactured in either a 130, 90, 65, or 45 nm process. Socket 604 processors cannot be inserted into Socket 603 designed motherboards due to one additional pin being present, but Socket 603 processors can be inserted into Socket 604 designed motherboards, since the extra pin slot does not do anything for a 603 CPU.

Socket 604 processors range from 1.60 GHz through 3.80 GHz, with the higher clock rates only found among older, slower NetBurst-based Xeons.

The following Xeon chipsets used Socket 604:

- Intel E7205
- Intel E7210 Canterwood-ES
- Intel E7300
- Intel E7320
- Intel E7500
- Intel E7501
- Intel E7505
- Intel E7520
- Intel E7525

Late Socket 604 "revivals":

- Intel Xeon 7300 (used by Tigerton)
- Intel Xeon 7400 (used by Dunnington)

== See also ==
- List of Intel microprocessors
- List of Intel Xeon microprocessors
