= Socket 603 =

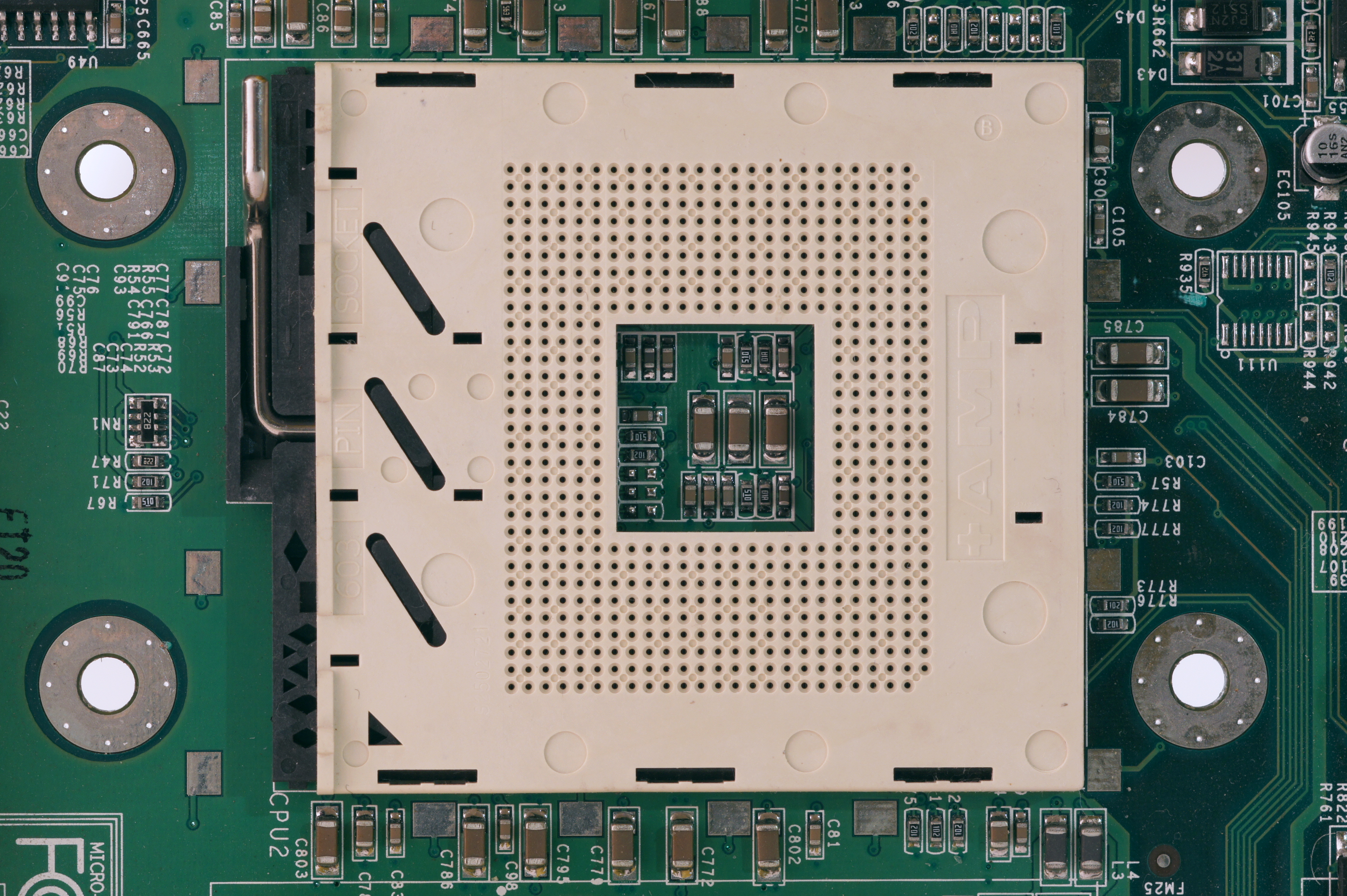
- Type: PGA-ZIF
- Chip form factors: pin grid array
- Contacts: 603
- Processors: Intel Xeon
- Predecessor: Slot 2
- Successor: Socket 604
- This article is part of the CPU socket series

Socket 603 is a motherboard socket for Intel's Xeon processor.

== Technical specifications ==
Socket 603 was designed by Intel as a zero insertion force socket intended for workstations and server platforms. It contains 603 contacts arrayed in a grid about the center of the socket, each contact has a 1.27mm pitch with regular pin array, to mate with a 603-pin processor package. Intel's design notes distinguish Socket 603 from Socket 604 as low cost, low risk, robust, high volume manufacturable, and multi-sourceable.

All Socket 603 processors have a bus speed of 400 MHz and were manufactured in either a 180 nm process, or 130 nm process. Socket 603 processors can be inserted into Socket 604 designed motherboards, but Socket 604 processors cannot be inserted into Socket 603 designed motherboards due to one additional pin being present. Socket 603 processors range from 1.4 GHz to 3.2 GHz.
