= List of Intel Xeon processors (Ivy Bridge–based) =

This is a list of Ivy Bridge–based Intel Xeon processors.

== "Gladden" (22 nm) ==
- All models support: MMX, Streaming SIMD Extensions (SSE), SSE2, SSE3, SSSE3, SSE4.1, SSE4.2, Advanced Vector Extensions (AVX), Enhanced Intel SpeedStep Technology (EIST), Intel 64, XD bit (an NX bit implementation), Trusted Execution Technology (TXT), Intel VT-x, Intel EPT, Intel VT-d, Hyper-threading, AES-NI.
- All models support uni-processor configurations only.
- Die size: 160 mm^{2}
- Steppings: E1
- All models support DDR3 and DDR3L at up to 1600 MT/s.

=== Xeon E3-11xx v2 (uniprocessor) ===
Model number	sSpec number	Cores	Frequency	Turbo	L2 cache	L3 cache	TDP	Socket	I/O bus	Memory	Release date	Part number(s)	Release price (USD)
Xeon E3-1105C v2	SR1J1 (E1)	4	1.8 GHz	—N/a	4 × 256 KB	8 MB	25 W	BGA 1284	DMI 2.0	2× DDR3-1600	September 10, 2013	CN8063801194002	$320
Xeon E3-1125C v2	SR1J0 (E1)	4	2.5 GHz	—N/a	4 × 256 KB	8 MB	40 W	BGA 1284	DMI 2.0	2× DDR3-1600	September 10, 2013	CN8063801193902	$448
Xeon E3-1135C v2	SR1HZ (E1)	4	3 GHz	—N/a	4 × 256 KB	8 MB	55 W	BGA 1284	DMI 2.0	2× DDR3-1600	September 10, 2013	CN8063801193802	OEM

== "Ivy Bridge" (22 nm) ==
- All models support: MMX, SSE, SSE2, SSE3, SSSE3, SSE4.1, SSE4.2, AVX, F16C, Enhanced Intel SpeedStep Technology (EIST), Intel 64, XD bit (an NX bit implementation), TXT, Intel VT-x, Intel EPT, Intel VT-d, Hyper-threading (except E3-1220 v2 and E3-1225 v2), Turbo Boost, AES-NI, Smart Cache, ECC
- Transistors: E1: 1.4 billion
- Die size: E1: 160 mm^{2}
- All models support uni-processor configurations only.
- Intel HD Graphics P4000 uses drivers that are optimized and certified for professional applications, similar to nVidia Quadro and AMD FirePro products.

=== Xeon E3-12xx v2 (uniprocessor) ===
Model number	sSpec number	Cores	Frequency	Turbo	L2 cache	L3 cache	GPU model	GPU frequency	TDP	Socket	I/O bus	Release date	Part number(s)	Release price (USD)
Dual Core, low power
Xeon E3-1220L v2	SR0R6 (L1)	2	2.3 GHz	10/12	2 × 256 KB	3 MB	—N/a	—N/a	17 W	LGA 1155	DMI 2.0	May 14, 2012	CM8063701099001	$189
Quad Core
Xeon E3-1220 v2	SR0PH (E1)	4	3.1 GHz	2/3/4/4	4 × 256 KB	8 MB	—N/a	—N/a	69 W	LGA 1155	DMI 2.0	May 14, 2012	CM8063701160503; BX80637E31220V2	$189 $203
Xeon E3-1225 v2	SR0PJ (E1)	4	3.2 GHz	2/3/4/4	4 × 256 KB	8 MB	HD Graphics P4000	650–1250 MHz	77 W	LGA 1155	DMI 2.0	May 14, 2012	CM8063701160603; BX80637E31225V2	$209 $224
Xeon E3-1230 v2	SR0P4 (E1)	4	3.3 GHz	2/3/4/4	4 × 256 KB	8 MB	—N/a	—N/a	69 W	LGA 1155	DMI 2.0	May 14, 2012	CM8063701098101; BX80637E31230V2	$215 $230
Xeon E3-1240 v2	SR0P5 (E1)	4	3.4 GHz	2/3/4/4	4 × 256 KB	8 MB	—N/a	—N/a	69 W	LGA 1155	DMI 2.0	May 14, 2012	CM8063701098201; BX80637E31240V2	$250 $261
Xeon E3-1245 v2	SR0P9 (E1)	4	3.4 GHz	2/3/4/4	4 × 256 KB	8 MB	HD Graphics P4000	650–1250 MHz	77 W	LGA 1155	DMI 2.0	May 14, 2012	CM8063701098602; BX80637E31245V2	$266 $273
Xeon E3-1270 v2	SR0P6 (E1)	4	3.5 GHz	2/3/4/4	4 × 256 KB	8 MB	—N/a	—N/a	69 W	LGA 1155	DMI 2.0	May 14, 2012	CM8063701098301; BX80637E31270V2	$328 $339
Xeon E3-1275 v2	SR0PA (E1)	4	3.5 GHz	2/3/4/4	4 × 256 KB	8 MB	HD Graphics P4000	650–1250 MHz	77 W	LGA 1155	DMI 2.0	May 14, 2012	CM8063701098702; BX80637E31275V2	$339 $350
Xeon E3-1280 v2	SR0P7 (E1)	4	3.6 GHz	1/2/3/4	4 × 256 KB	8 MB	—N/a	—N/a	69 W	LGA 1155	DMI 2.0	May 14, 2012	CM8063701098404; BX80637E31280V2	$612 $623
Xeon E3-1285 v2	SR0PD (E1)	4	3.6 GHz	1/2/3/4	4 × 256 KB	8 MB	HD Graphics P4000	650–1250 MHz	77 W	LGA 1155	DMI 2.0	May 14, 2012	CM8063701133702	OEM
Xeon E3-1290 v2	SR0PC (E1)	4	3.7 GHz	1/2/3/4	4 × 256 KB	8 MB	—N/a	—N/a	87 W	LGA 1155	DMI 2.0	May 14, 2012	CM8063701099101	$884
Quad Core, low power
Xeon E3-1265L v2	SR0PB (E1)	4	2.5 GHz	6/7/9/10	4 × 256 KB	8 MB	HD Graphics 2500	650–1150 MHz	45 W	LGA 1155	DMI 2.0	May 14, 2012	CM8063701098906; BX80637E31265L2	$294 $305
Xeon E3-1285L v2	SR0RD (E1)	4	3.2 GHz	3/4/6/7	4 × 256 KB	8 MB	HD Graphics P4000	650–1250 MHz	65 W	LGA 1155	DMI 2.0	May 14, 2012	CM8063701213802	OEM

== "Ivy Bridge-EN" (22 nm) Entry ==
- All models support: MMX, SSE, SSE2, SSE3, SSSE3, SSE4.1, SSE4.2, AVX, F16C, Enhanced Intel SpeedStep Technology (EIST), Intel 64, XD bit (an NX bit implementation), TXT, Intel VT-x, Intel EPT, Intel VT-d, Intel VT-c, Intel x8 SDDC, Hyper-threading (except E5-2403 v2 and E5-2407 v2), Turbo Boost (except E5-2403 v2, E5-2407 v2 and E5-2418L v2), AES-NI, Smart Cache.
- Support for up to six DIMMs of DDR3 memory per CPU socket.

=== Xeon E5-14xx v2 (uniprocessor) ===
Model number	sSpec number	Cores	Frequency	Turbo	L2 cache	L3 cache	TDP	Socket	I/O bus	Memory	Release date	Part number(s)	Release price (USD)
Xeon E5-1410 v2	SR1B0 (S1)	4	2.8 GHz	3/3/4/4	4 × 256 KB	10 MB	80 W	LGA 1356	DMI 2.0	3× DDR3-1600	Jan 9, 2014	CM8063401376501	$298
Xeon E5-1428L v2	SR1B9 (S1)	6	2.2 GHz	2/2/2/3/4/5	6 × 256 KB	15 MB	60 W	LGA 1356	DMI 2.0	3× DDR3-1600	Jan 9, 2014	CM8063401521400	$494

=== Xeon E5-24xx v2 (dual-processor) ===
Model number	sSpec number	Cores	Frequency	Turbo	L2 cache	L3 cache	TDP	Socket	I/O bus	Memory	Release date	Part number(s)	Release price (USD)
Quad Core
Xeon E5-2403 v2	SR1AL (S1)	4	1.8 GHz	—N/a	4 × 256 KB	10 MB	80 W	LGA 1356	6.4 GT/s QPI	3× DDR3-1333	Jan 9, 2014	CM8063401286702; BX80634E52403V2	$192
Xeon E5-2407 v2	SR1AK (S1)	4	2.4 GHz	—N/a	4 × 256 KB	10 MB	80 W	LGA 1356	6.4 GT/s QPI	3× DDR3-1333	Jan 9, 2014	CM8063401286600; BX80634E52407V2	$250
Six Core
Xeon E5-2420 v2	SR1AJ (S1)	6	2.2 GHz	3/3/3/3/4/5	6 × 256 KB	15 MB	80 W	LGA 1356	7.2 GT/s QPI	3× DDR3-1600	Jan 9, 2014	CM8063401286503; BX80634E52420V2	$406
Xeon E5-2430 v2	SR1AH (S1)	6	2.5 GHz	3/3/3/3/4/5	6 × 256 KB	15 MB	80 W	LGA 1356	7.2 GT/s QPI	3× DDR3-1600	Jan 9, 2014	CM8063401286400; BX80634E52430V2	$551
Six Core, low power
Xeon E5-2418L v2	SR1AV (S1)	6	2 GHz	—N/a	6 × 256 KB	15 MB	50 W	LGA 1356	6.4 GT/s QPI	3× DDR3-1333	Jan 9, 2014	CM8063401294008	$607
Xeon E5-2430L v2	SR1B2 (S1)	6	2.4 GHz	2/2/2/2/3/4	6 × 256 KB	15 MB	60 W	LGA 1356	7.2 GT/s QPI	3× DDR3-1600	Jan 9, 2014	CM8063401376704	$612
Eight Core
Xeon E5-2440 v2	SR19T (M1)	8	1.9 GHz	3/3/3/3/3/3/4/5	8 × 256 KB	20 MB	95 W	LGA 1356	7.2 GT/s QPI	3× DDR3-1600	Jan 9, 2014	CM8063401286303; BX80634E52440V2	$832
Xeon E5-2450 v2	SR1A9 (M1)	8	2.5 GHz	4/4/4/4/5/6/7/8	8 × 256 KB	20 MB	95 W	LGA 1356	8.0 GT/s QPI	3× DDR3-1600	Jan 9, 2014	CM8063401376400; BX80634E52450V2	$1107
Eight Core, low power
Xeon E5-2428L v2	SR1A4 (M1)	8	1.8 GHz	2/2/3/3/4/4/5/5	8 × 256 KB	20 MB	60 W	LGA 1356	7.2 GT/s QPI	3× DDR3-1600	Jan 9, 2014	CM8063401293902	$1013
Ten Core
Xeon E5-2470 v2	SR19S (M1)	10	2.4 GHz	4/4/4/4/4/4/5/6/7/8	10 × 256 KB	25 MB	95 W	LGA 1356	8.0 GT/s QPI	3× DDR3-1600	Jan 9, 2014	CM8063401286102; BX80634E52470V2	$1440
Ten Core, low power
Xeon E5-2448L v2	SR1A3 (M1)	10	1.8 GHz	2/2/3/3/4/4/5/5/6/6	10 × 256 KB	25 MB	70 W	LGA 1356	8.0 GT/s QPI	3× DDR3-1600	Jan 9, 2014	CM8063401293802	$1424
Xeon E5-2450L v2	SR19U (M1)	10	1.7 GHz	2/2/2/2/2/2/2/2/3/4	10 × 256 KB	25 MB	60 W	LGA 1356	7.2 GT/s QPI	3× DDR3-1600	Jan 9, 2014	CM8063401287001	$1219

== "Ivy Bridge-EP" (22 nm) Efficient Performance ==
- All models support: MMX, SSE, SSE2, SSE3, SSSE3, SSE4.1, SSE4.2, AVX, F16C, Enhanced Intel SpeedStep Technology (EIST), Intel 64, XD bit (an NX bit implementation), TXT, Intel VT-x, Intel EPT, Intel VT-d, Intel VT-c, Intel x8 SDDC, Hyper-threading (except E5-1607 v2, E5-2603 v2, E5-2609 v2 and E5-4627 v2), Turbo Boost (except E5-1607 v2, E5-2603 v2, E5-2609 v2, E5-2618L v2, E5-4603 v2 and E5-4607 v2), AES-NI, Smart Cache.
- Support for up to 12 DIMMs of DDR3 memory per CPU socket.

=== Xeon E5-16xx v2 (uniprocessor) ===
Model number	sSpec number	Cores	Frequency	Turbo	L2 cache	L3 cache	TDP	Socket	I/O bus	Memory	Release date	Part number(s)	Release price (USD)
Quad Core
Xeon E5-1607 v2	SR1B3 (S1)	4	3 GHz	—N/a	4 × 256 KB	10 MB	130 W	LGA 2011	DMI 2.0	4× DDR3-1600	Sept 10, 2013	CM8063501376801	$244
Xeon E5-1620 v2	SR1AR (S1)	4	3.7 GHz	0/0/0/2	4 × 256 KB	10 MB	130 W	LGA 2011	DMI 2.0	4× DDR3-1866	Sept 10, 2013	CM8063501292405	$294
Six Core
Xeon E5-1650 v2	SR1AQ (S1)	6	3.5 GHz	1/1/2/2/2/4	6 × 256 KB	12 MB	130 W	LGA 2011	DMI 2.0	4× DDR3-1866	Sept 10, 2013	CM8063501292204	$583
Xeon E5-1660 v2	SR1AP (S1)	6	3.7 GHz	1/1/1/1/2/3	6 × 256 KB	15 MB	130 W	LGA 2011	DMI 2.0	4× DDR3-1866	Sept 10, 2013	CM8063501291808; BX80635E51660V2	$1080
Eight Core
Xeon E5-1680 v2	SR1MJ (M1)	8	3 GHz	4/4/4/4/5/7/8/9	8 × 256 KB	25 MB	130 W	LGA 2011	DMI 2.0	4× DDR3-1866	Sept 10, 2013	CM8063501589600	$1723

=== Xeon E5-26xx v2 (dual-processor) ===
Model number	sSpec number	Cores	Frequency	Turbo	L2 cache	L3 cache	TDP	Socket	I/O bus	Memory	Release date	Part number(s)	Release price (USD)
Quad Core
Xeon E5-2603 v2	SR1AY (S1)	4	1.8 GHz	—N/a	4 × 256 KB	10 MB	80 W	LGA 2011	2× 6.4 GT/s QPI	4× DDR3-1333	Sep 10, 2013	CM8063501375902; BX80635E52603V2	$202
Xeon E5-2609 v2	SR1AX (S1)	4	2.5 GHz	—N/a	4 × 256 KB	10 MB	80 W	LGA 2011	2× 6.4 GT/s QPI	4× DDR3-1333	Sep 10, 2013	CM8063501375800; BX80635E52609V2	$294
Xeon E5-2637 v2	SR1B7 (S1)	4	3.5 GHz	1/1/2/3	4 × 256 KB	15 MB	130 W	LGA 2011	2× 8.0 GT/s QPI	4× DDR3-1866	Sep 10, 2013	CM8063501520800	$996
Six Core
Xeon E5-2620 v2	SR1AN (S1)	6	2.1 GHz	3/3/3/3/4/5	6 × 256 KB	15 MB	80 W	LGA 2011	2× 7.2 GT/s QPI	4× DDR3-1600	Sep 10, 2013	CM8063501288301; BX80635E52620V2	$406
Xeon E5-2630 v2	SR1AM (S1)	6	2.6 GHz	3/3/3/3/4/5	6 × 256 KB	15 MB	80 W	LGA 2011	2× 7.2 GT/s QPI	4× DDR3-1600	Sep 10, 2013	CM8063501288100; BX80635E52630V2	$612
Xeon E5-2643 v2	SR19X (M1)	6	3.5 GHz	1/1/1/1/2/3	6 × 256 KB	25 MB	130 W	LGA 2011	2× 8.0 GT/s QPI	4× DDR3-1866	Sep 10, 2013	CM8063501287403	$1552
Six Core, low power
Xeon E5-2618L v2	SR1B8 (S1)	6	2 GHz	—N/a	6 × 256 KB	15 MB	50 W	LGA 2011	2× 6.4 GT/s QPI	4× DDR3-1333	Sep 10, 2013	CM8063501521302	$520
Xeon E5-2630L v2	SR1AZ (S1)	6	2.4 GHz	2/2/2/2/3/4	6 × 256 KB	15 MB	60 W	LGA 2011	2× 7.2 GT/s QPI	4× DDR3-1600	Sep 10, 2013	CM8063501376200	$612
Eight Core
Xeon E5-2640 v2	SR19Z (M1)	8	2 GHz	3/3/3/3/3/3/4/5	8 × 256 KB	20 MB	95 W	LGA 2011	2× 7.2 GT/s QPI	4× DDR3-1600	Sep 10, 2013	CM8063501288202; BX80635E52640V2	$885
Xeon E5-2650 v2	SR1A8 (M1)	8	2.6 GHz	4/4/4/4/5/6/7/8	8 × 256 KB	20 MB	95 W	LGA 2011	2× 8.0 GT/s QPI	4× DDR3-1866	Sep 10, 2013	CM8063501375101; BX80635E52650V2	$1166
Xeon E5-2667 v2	SR19W (M1)	8	3.3 GHz	3/3/3/3/4/5/6/7	8 × 256 KB	25 MB	130 W	LGA 2011	2× 8.0 GT/s QPI	4× DDR3-1866	Sep 10, 2013	CM8063501287304	$2057
Xeon E5-2673 v2	SR1UR (M1)	8	3.3 GHz	3/3/3/3/4/5/6/7	8 × 256 KB	25 MB	110 W	LGA 2011	2× 8.0 GT/s QPI	4× DDR3-1866	Dec 2013	CM8063501718101	OEM
Xeon E5-2687W v2	SR19V (M1)	8	3.4 GHz	2/2/2/2/3/4/5/6	8 × 256 KB	25 MB	150 W	LGA 2011	2× 8.0 GT/s QPI	4× DDR3-1866	Sep 10, 2013	CM8063501287203; BX80635E52687V2	$2108
Eight Core, low power
Xeon E5-2628L v2	SR1AF (M1)	8	1.9 GHz	2/2/3/3/4/4/5/5	8 × 256 KB	20 MB	70 W	LGA 2011	2× 7.2 GT/s QPI	4× DDR3-1600	Sep 10, 2013	CM8063501522202	$1216
Ten Core
Xeon E5-2658 v2	SR1A0 (M1)	10	2.4 GHz	2/2/3/3/4/4/ 5/5/6/6	10 × 256 KB	25 MB	95 W	LGA 2011	2× 8.0 GT/s QPI	4× DDR3-1866	Sep 10, 2013	CM8063501293200	$1750
Xeon E5-2660 v2	SR1AB (M1)	10	2.2 GHz	4/4/4/4/4/4/ 5/6/7/8	10 × 256 KB	25 MB	95 W	LGA 2011	2× 8.0 GT/s QPI	4× DDR3-1866	Sep 10, 2013	CM8063501452503; BX80635E52660V2	$1389
Xeon E5-2670 v2	SR1A7 (M1)	10	2.5 GHz	4/4/4/4/4/4/ 5/6/7/8	10 × 256 KB	25 MB	115 W	LGA 2011	2× 8.0 GT/s QPI	4× DDR3-1866	Sep 10, 2013	CM8063501375000; BX80635E52670V2	$1552
Xeon E5-2680 v2	SR1A6 (M1)	10	2.8 GHz	3/3/3/3/3/4/ 5/6/7/8	10 × 256 KB	25 MB	115 W	LGA 2011	2× 8.0 GT/s QPI	4× DDR3-1866	Sep 10, 2013	CM8063501374901; BX80635E52680V2	$1723
Xeon E5-2690 v2	SR1A5 (M1)	10	3 GHz	3/3/3/3/3/3/ 3/4/5/6	10 × 256 KB	25 MB	130 W	LGA 2011	2× 8.0 GT/s QPI	4× DDR3-1866	Sep 10, 2013	CM8063501374802; BX80635E52690V2	$2057
Ten Core, low power
Xeon E5-2648L v2	SR1A2 (M1)	10	1.9 GHz	2/2/3/3/4/4/ 5/5/6/6	10 × 256 KB	25 MB	70 W	LGA 2011	2× 8.0 GT/s QPI	4× DDR3-1866	Sep 10, 2013	CM8063501293506	$1479
Xeon E5-2650L v2	SR19Y (M1)	10	1.7 GHz	2/2/2/2/2/2/ 2/2/3/4	10 × 256 KB	25 MB	70 W	LGA 2011	2× 7.2 GT/s QPI	4× DDR3-1600	Sep 10, 2013	CM8063501287602	$1219
Twelve Core
Xeon E5-2651 v2	SR19K (C1)	12	1.8 GHz	2/2/2/2/2/2/ 2/2/2/2/3/4	12 × 256 KB	30 MB	105 W	LGA 2011	2× 6.4 GT/s QPI	4× DDR3-1600	Q4 2013	CM8063501521101	OEM
Xeon E5-2692 v2	SR15T (C0)	12	2.2 GHz	4/4/4/4/4/4/ 4/4/5/6/7/8	12 × 256 KB	30 MB	115 W	LGA 2011	2× 8.0 GT/s QPI	4× DDR3-1866	June 2013	CM8063501452600	OEM for Tianhe-2
Xeon E5-2695 v2	SR1BA (C1)	12	2.4 GHz	4/4/4/4/4/4/ 4/4/5/6/7/8	12 × 256 KB	30 MB	115 W	LGA 2011	2× 8.0 GT/s QPI	4× DDR3-1866	Sep 10, 2013	CM8063501288706; BX80635E52695V2	$2336
Xeon E5-2696 v2	SR19G (C1)	12	2.5 GHz	6/6/6/6/6/6/ 6/6/7/8/9/10	12 × 256 KB	30 MB	120 W	LGA 2011	2× 8.0 GT/s QPI	4× DDR3-1866	Q4 2013	CM8063501288842	OEM
Xeon E5-2697 v2	SR19H (C1)	12	2.7 GHz	3/3/3/3/3/3/ 3/4/5/6/7/8	12 × 256 KB	30 MB	130 W	LGA 2011	2× 8.0 GT/s QPI	4× DDR3-1866	Sep 10, 2013	CM8063501288843; BX80635E52697V2	$2614

=== Xeon E5-46xx v2 (quad-processor) ===
Model number	sSpec number	Cores	Frequency	Turbo	L2 cache	L3 cache	TDP	Socket	I/O bus	Memory	Release date	Part number(s)	Release price (USD)
Quad Core
Xeon E5-4603 v2	SR1B6 (S1)	4	2.2 GHz	—N/a	4 × 256 KB	10 MB	95 W	LGA 2011	2× 6.4 GT/s QPI	4× DDR3-1333	March 3, 2014	CM8063501453800	$551
Six Core
Xeon E5-4607 v2	SR1B4 (S1)	6	2.6 GHz	—N/a	6 × 256 KB	15 MB	95 W	LGA 2011	2× 6.4 GT/s QPI	4× DDR3-1333	March 3, 2014	CM8063501377604	$885
Eight Core
Xeon E5-4610 v2	SR19L (C1)	8	2.3 GHz	2/2/2/2/2/2/3/4	8 × 256 KB	16 MB	95 W	LGA 2011	2× 7.2 GT/s QPI	4× DDR3-1600	March 3, 2014	CM8063501521600	$1219
Xeon E5-4620 v2	SR1AA (M1)	8	2.6 GHz	2/2/2/2/2/2/3/4	8 × 256 KB	20 MB	95 W	LGA 2011	2× 7.2 GT/s QPI	4× DDR3-1600	March 3, 2014	CM8063501393202	$1611
Xeon E5-4627 v2	SR1AD (M1)	8	3.3 GHz	2/2/2/2/2/2/2/3	8 × 256 KB	16 MB	130 W	LGA 2011	2× 7.2 GT/s QPI	4× DDR3-1866	March 3, 2014	CM8063501454002	$2108
Ten Core
Xeon E5-4624L v2	SR1A1 (M1)	10	1.9 GHz	2/2/3/3/4/4/ 5/5/6/6	10 × 256 KB	25 MB	70 W	LGA 2011	2× 8.0 GT/s QPI	4× DDR3-1866	March 3, 2014	CM8063501293407	$2405
Xeon E5-4640 v2	SR19R (M1)	10	2.2 GHz	3/3/3/3/3/3/ 3/3/4/5	10 × 256 KB	20 MB	95 W	LGA 2011	2× 8.0 GT/s QPI	4× DDR3-1866	March 3, 2014	CM8063501285713	$2725
Xeon E5-4650 v2	SR1AG (M1)	10	2.4 GHz	3/3/3/3/3/3/ 3/3/4/5	10 × 256 KB	25 MB	95 W	LGA 2011	2× 8.0 GT/s QPI	4× DDR3-1866	March 3, 2014	CM8063501541700	$3616
Twelve Core
Xeon E5-4657L v2	SR19F (C1)	12	2.4 GHz	3/3/3/3/3/3/ 3/3/3/3/4/5	12 × 256 KB	30 MB	115 W	LGA 2011	2× 8.0 GT/s QPI	4× DDR3-1866	March 3, 2014	CM8063501285605	$4394

== "Ivy Bridge-EX" (22 nm) Expandable ==
- All models support: MMX, SSE, SSE2, SSE3, SSSE3, SSE4.1, SSE4.2, AVX, F16C, Enhanced Intel SpeedStep Technology (EIST), Intel 64, XD bit (an NX bit implementation), TXT, Intel VT-x, Intel EPT, Intel VT-d, Intel VT-c, Intel x8 SDDC, Hyper-threading (except E7-8857 v2), Turbo Boost (except E7-4809 v2), AES-NI, Smart Cache.
- Support for up to 24 DIMMs of DDR3 memory per CPU socket.

=== Xeon E7-28xx v2 (dual-processor) ===
Model number	sSpec number	Cores	Frequency	Turbo	L2 cache	L3 cache	TDP	Socket	I/O bus	Memory	Release date	Part number(s)	Release price (USD)
Twelve Core
Xeon E7-2850 v2	SR1F3 (D1)	12	2.3 GHz	3/3/3/3/3/3/3/ 3/3/3/4/5	12 × 256 KB	24 MB	105 W	LGA 2011-1	3× 7.2 GT/s QPI	4× DDR3-1600	Feb 18, 2014	CM8063601275706	$2558
Fifteen Core
Xeon E7-2870 v2	SR1GR (D1)	15	2.3 GHz	4/4/4/4/4/4/4/ 4/4/4/4/4/4/5/6	15 × 256 KB	30 MB	130 W	LGA 2011-1	3× 8.0 GT/s QPI	4× DDR3-1600	Feb 18, 2014	CM8063601273406	$4227
Xeon E7-2880 v2	SR1GQ (D1)	15	2.5 GHz	4/4/4/4/4/4/4/ 4/4/4/4/4/4/5/6	15 × 256 KB	37.5 MB	130 W	LGA 2011-1	3× 8.0 GT/s QPI	4× DDR3-1600	Feb 18, 2014	CM8063601273306	$5339
Xeon E7-2890 v2	SR1GV (D1)	15	2.8 GHz	4/4/4/4/4/4/4/ 4/4/4/4/4/4/5/6	15 × 256 KB	37.5 MB	155 W	LGA 2011-1	3× 8.0 GT/s QPI	4× DDR3-1600	Feb 18, 2014	CM8063601375306	$6451

=== Xeon E7-48xx v2 (quad-processor) ===
Model number	sSpec number	Cores	Frequency	Turbo	L2 cache	L3 cache	TDP	Socket	I/O bus	Memory	Release date	Part number(s)	Release price (USD)
Six Core
Xeon E7-4809 v2	SR1FD (D1)	6	1.9 GHz	—N/a	6 × 256 KB	12 MB	105 W	LGA 2011-1	3× 6.4 GT/s QPI	4× DDR3-1333	Feb 18, 2014	CM8063601537106	$1223
Eight Core
Xeon E7-4820 v2	SR1H0 (D1)	8	2 GHz	3/3/3/3/3/3/4/5	8 × 256 KB	16 MB	105 W	LGA 2011-1	3× 7.2 GT/s QPI	4× DDR3-1600	Feb 18, 2014	CM8063601521707	$1446
Ten Core
Xeon E7-4830 v2	SR1GU (D1)	10	2.2 GHz	3/3/3/3/3/3/3/ 3/4/5	10 × 256 KB	20 MB	105 W	LGA 2011-1	3× 7.2 GT/s QPI	4× DDR3-1600	Feb 18, 2014	CM8063601374506	$2059
Twelve Core
Xeon E7-4850 v2	SR1GP (D1)	12	2.3 GHz	3/3/3/3/3/3/3/ 3/3/3/4/5	12 × 256 KB	24 MB	105 W	LGA 2011-1	3× 7.2 GT/s QPI	4× DDR3-1600	Feb 18, 2014	CM8063601272906	$2837
Xeon E7-4860 v2	SR1GX (D1)	12	2.6 GHz	4/4/4/4/4/4/4/ 4/4/4/5/6	12 × 256 KB	30 MB	130 W	LGA 2011-1	3× 8.0 GT/s QPI	4× DDR3-1600	Feb 18, 2014	CM8063601453406	$3838
Fifteen Core
Xeon E7-4870 v2	SR1GN (D1)	15	2.3 GHz	4/4/4/4/4/4/4/ 4/4/4/4/4/4/5/6	15 × 256 KB	30 MB	130 W	LGA 2011-1	3× 8.0 GT/s QPI	4× DDR3-1600	Feb 18, 2014	CM8063601272606	$4394
Xeon E7-4880 v2	SR1GM (D1)	15	2.5 GHz	4/4/4/4/4/4/4/ 4/4/4/4/4/4/5/6	15 × 256 KB	37.5 MB	130 W	LGA 2011-1	3× 8.0 GT/s QPI	4× DDR3-1600	Feb 18, 2014	CM8063601272512	$5506
Xeon E7-4890 v2	SR1GL (D1)	15	2.8 GHz	4/4/4/4/4/4/4/ 4/4/4/4/4/4/5/6	15 × 256 KB	37.5 MB	155 W	LGA 2011-1	3× 8.0 GT/s QPI	4× DDR3-1600	Feb 18, 2014	CM8063601272412	$6619

=== Xeon E7-88xx v2 (octa-processor) ===
Model number	sSpec number	Cores	Frequency	Turbo	L2 cache	L3 cache	TDP	Socket	I/O bus	Memory	Release date	Part number(s)	Release price (USD)
Six Core
Xeon E7-8893 v2	SR1GZ (D1)	6	3.4 GHz	1/1/1/1/2/3	6 × 256 KB	37.5 MB	155 W	LGA 2011-1	3× 8.0 GT/s QPI	4× DDR3-1600	Feb 18, 2014	CM8063601454907	$6841
Ten Core
Xeon E7-8891 v2	SR1GW (D1)	10	3.2 GHz	3/3/3/3/3/3/3/ 3/4/5	10 × 256 KB	37.5 MB	155 W	LGA 2011-1	3× 8.0 GT/s QPI	4× DDR3-1600	Feb 18, 2014	CM8063601377422	$6841
Twelve Core
Xeon E7-8850 v2	SR1GK (D1)	12	2.3 GHz	3/3/3/3/3/3/3/ 3/3/3/4/5	12 × 256 KB	24 MB	105 W	LGA 2011-1	3× 7.2 GT/s QPI	4× DDR3-1600	Feb 18, 2014	CM8063601272306	$3059
Xeon E7-8857 v2	SR1GT (D1)	12	3 GHz	4/4/4/4/4/4/4/ 4/4/4/5/6	12 × 256 KB	30 MB	130 W	LGA 2011-1	3× 8.0 GT/s QPI	4× DDR3-1600	Feb 18, 2014	CM8063601275912	$3838
Fifteen Core
Xeon E7-8870 v2	SR1GJ (D1)	15	2.3 GHz	4/4/4/4/4/4/4/ 4/4/4/4/4/4/5/6	15 × 256 KB	30 MB	130 W	LGA 2011-1	3× 8.0 GT/s QPI	4× DDR3-1600	Feb 18, 2014	CM8063601272006	$4616
Xeon E7-8880 v2	SR1GH (D1)	15	2.5 GHz	4/4/4/4/4/4/4/ 4/4/4/4/4/4/5/6	15 × 256 KB	37.5 MB	130 W	LGA 2011-1	3× 8.0 GT/s QPI	4× DDR3-1600	Feb 18, 2014	CM8063601271810	$5729
Xeon E7-8880L v2	SR1GS (D1)	15	2.2 GHz	4/4/4/4/4/4/4/ 4/4/4/4/4/4/5/6	15 × 256 KB	37.5 MB	105 W	LGA 2011-1	3× 8.0 GT/s QPI	4× DDR3-1600	Feb 18, 2014	CM8063601275812	$5729
Xeon E7-8890 v2	SR1ET (D1)	15	2.8 GHz	4/4/4/4/4/4/4/ 4/4/4/4/4/4/5/6	15 × 256 KB	37.5 MB	155 W	LGA 2011-1	3× 8.0 GT/s QPI	4× DDR3-1600	Feb 18, 2014	CM8063601213513	$6841
Xeon E7-8895 v2	SR1NR (D1)	15	2.8 GHz	4/4/4/4/4/6/6/ 6/6/7/7/7/7/8/8	15 × 256 KB	37.5 MB	155 W	LGA 2011-1	3× 8.0 GT/s QPI	4× DDR3-1600	Feb 18, 2014	CM8063601589723	OEM for Oracle
