= List of AMD Athlon X2 processors =

The AMD Athlon X2 processor family consists of processors based on both the Athlon 64 X2 and the Phenom processor families. The original Athlon X2 processors were low-power Athlon 64 X2 Brisbane processors, while newer processors released in Q2 2008 are based on the K10 Kuma processor.

== K8-based ==
=== "Brisbane" (G1 & G2, 65 nm) ===
==== Energy-efficient 'BE' series ====
- All models support: MMX, SSE, SSE2, SSE3, Enhanced 3DNow!, NX bit, AMD64, Cool'n'Quiet, AMD-V

Model number	Stepping	Frequency	L2 Cache	HT	Multi (Note: The clock multiplier applies to the 200 MHz HyperTransport base clock.)	V_{Core}	TDP	Socket	Release date	Part number(s)
Athlon X2 BE-2300	G2	1900 MHz	2 × 512 kB	1.0 GHz	9.5×	1.25 V	45 W	Socket AM2	October, 2007	ADH2300IAA5DO
Athlon X2 BE-2350	G2	2100 MHz	2 × 512 kB	1.0 GHz	10.5×	1.25 V	45 W	Socket AM2	October, 2007	ADH2350IAA5DO
Athlon X2 BE-2400	G2	2300 MHz	2 × 512 kB	1.0 GHz	11.5×	1.25 V	45 W	Socket AM2	October, 2007	ADH2400IAA5DO
Athlon X2 BE-2450	G2	2500 MHz	2 × 512 kB	1.0 GHz	12.5×	1.25 V	45 W	Socket AM2	October, 2007	ADH2450IAA5DO

==== Energy-efficient 'e' series ====
- All models support: MMX, SSE, SSE2, SSE3, Enhanced 3DNow!, NX bit, AMD64, Cool'n'Quiet, AMD-V

Model number	Stepping	Frequency	L2 Cache	HT	Multi	V_{Core}	TDP	Socket	Release date	Part number(s)
Athlon X2 3250e	G2	1500 MHz	2 × 512 kB	1.0 GHz	7.5×	1.15 - 1.25 V	22 W	Socket AM2	Q4, 2008	ADJ3250IAA5DO
Athlon X2 4050e	G2	2100 MHz	2 × 512 kB	1.0 GHz	10.5×	1.15 - 1.25 V	45 W	Socket AM2	April 21, 2008	ADH4050IAA5DO
Athlon X2 4450e	G2	2300 MHz	2 × 512 kB	1.0 GHz	11.5×	1.15 - 1.25 V	45 W	Socket AM2	April 21, 2008	ADH4450IAA5DO
Athlon X2 4850e	G2	2500 MHz	2 × 512 kB	1.0 GHz	12.5×	1.15 - 1.25 V	45 W	Socket AM2	March 5, 2008	ADH4850IAA5DO
Athlon X2 5050e	G2	2600 MHz	2 × 512 kB	1.0 GHz	13×	1.15 - 1.25 V	45 W	Socket AM2	October 21, 2008	ADH5050IAA5DO

==== Business-class 'B' series (Note: AMD Business Class processor, availability guaranteed for 24 months after release.) ====
- All models support: MMX, SSE, SSE2, SSE3, Enhanced 3DNow!, NX bit, AMD64, Cool'n'Quiet, AMD-V

Model number	Stepping	Frequency	L2 Cache	HT	Multi	V_{Core}	TDP	Socket	Release date	Part number(s)
Athlon X2 4450B	G2	2300 MHz	2 × 512 kB	1.0 GHz	11.5×	1.15 - 1.25 V	45 W	Socket AM2	April 28, 2008	ADH445BIAA5DO
Athlon X2 4850B	G2	2500 MHz	2 × 512 kB	1.0 GHz	12.5×	1.1 - 1.35 V	45 W	Socket AM2	August 18, 2008	ADH485BIAA5DO
Athlon X2 5000B	G2	2600 MHz	2 × 512 kB	1.0 GHz	13×	1.325 - 1.375 V	65 W	Socket AM2	April 28, 2008	ADO500BIAA5DO
Athlon X2 5200B	G2	2700 MHz	2 × 512 kB	1.0 GHz	13.5×	1.325 - 1.375 V	65 W	Socket AM2	April 28, 2008	ADO520BIAA5DO
Athlon X2 5400B	G2	2800 MHz	2 × 512 kB	1.0 GHz	14×	1.3 - 1.35 V	65 W	Socket AM2	April 28, 2008	ADO540BIAA5DO
Athlon X2 5600B	G2	2900 MHz	2 × 512 kB	1.0 GHz	14.5×	1.1 - 1.35 V	65 W	Socket AM2	August 18, 2008	ADO560BIAA5DO

== K10-based ==
=== "Kuma" (B3, 65 nm) ===
- Chip harvests from Agena with two cores disabled
- All models support: MMX, SSE, SSE2, SSE3, SSE4a, ABM, Enhanced 3DNow!, NX bit, AMD64, Cool'n'Quiet, AMD-V
- Memory support: DDR2 SDRAM up to PC2-8500

Model number	Stepping	Frequency	L2 Cache	L3 Cache	HT	Multi	V_{Core}	TDP	Socket	Release date	Part number(s)
Athlon X2 6500; Black Edition (Note: The Black Edition features an unlocked multiplier.)	B3	2300 MHz	2 × 512 kB	2 MB	1.8 GHz	11.5×	1.10 - 1.25 V	95 W	Socket AM2+	September 8, 2008	AD6500WCJ2BGH
Athlon X2 7450	B3	2400 MHz	2 × 512 kB	2 MB	1.8 GHz	12×	1.05 - 1.325 V	95 W	Socket AM2+	December 15, 2008	AD7450WCJ2BGH
Athlon X2 7550	B3	2500 MHz	2 × 512 kB	2 MB	1.8 GHz	12.5×	1.05 - 1.325 V	95 W	Socket AM2+	December 15, 2008	AD7550WCJ2BGH
Athlon X2 7750	B3	2700 MHz	2 × 512 kB	2 MB	1.8 GHz	13.5×	1.05 - 1.325 V	95 W	Socket AM2+	April 28, 2009	AD7750WCJ2BGH
Athlon X2 7750; Black Edition	B3	2700 MHz	2 × 512 kB	2 MB	1.8 GHz	13.5×	1.05 - 1.325 V	95 W	Socket AM2+	December 15, 2008	AD775ZWCJ2BGH
Athlon X2 7850; Black Edition	B3	2800 MHz	2 × 512 kB	2 MB	1.8 GHz	14×	1.2 - 1.25 V	95 W	Socket AM2+	April 28, 2009	AD785ZWCJ2BGH

=== "Regor/Deneb" (C2, 45 nm) ===
- Some 5000 series processors are chip harvests from Propus or Deneb; All 5200 series chips are harvests, each has two cores disabled
- All models support: MMX, SSE, SSE2, SSE3, SSE4a, ABM, Enhanced 3DNow!, NX bit, AMD64, Cool'n'Quiet, AMD-V

Model number	Stepping	Frequency	L2 Cache	HT	Multi	V_{Core}	TDP	Socket	Release date	Part number(s)
Athlon X2 5000+	C2	2200 MHz	2 × 512 kB	2.0/3.2 GHz	11×	0.95 - 1.4 V	65 W	Socket AM2+		AD5000OGJ22GI
Athlon X2 5200+	C2	2300 MHz	2 × 512 kB	2.0/3.2 GHz	11.5×	0.95 - 1.4 V	65 W	Socket AM2+		AD5200OCK22GM

== See also ==
- Athlon X2
- AMD Phenom
- List of AMD Athlon 64 processors
- List of AMD Phenom processors
