= Socket 939 =

CPU socket for old AMD CPUs

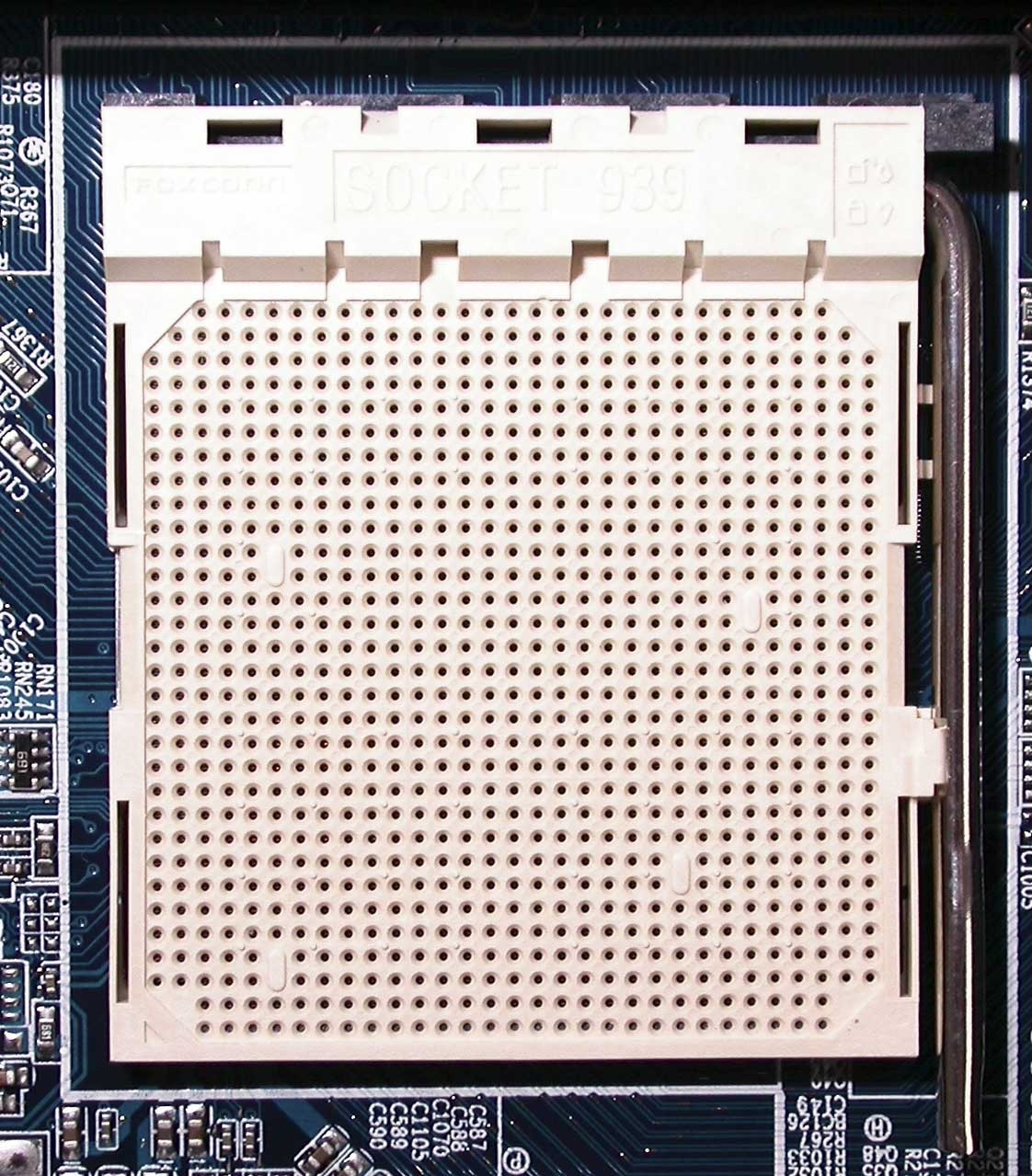
- Release date: 2004-06
- Type: PGA-ZIF
- Chip form factors: OPGA
- Contacts: 939
- FSB frequency: 200 MHz System clock 1000 MHz HyperTransport link
- Voltage range: 0.8–1.55 V
- Processor dimensions: 40 mm × 40 mm 1,600 mm²
- Processors: AMD Athlon 64 (3000+ - 4000+); AMD Athlon 64 FX (53 - 60); AMD Athlon 64 X2 (3600+ - 4800+); Some AMD Opteron 1xx series Some Sempron 3x00+ (Step E3, E6)
- Predecessor: Socket 754
- Successor: AM2
- Memory support: DDR
- This article is part of the CPU socket series

Socket 939 (also known as Socket AM1) is a CPU socket released by AMD in June 2004 to supersede the previous Socket 754 for Athlon 64 processors. Socket 939 was succeeded by Socket AM2 in May 2006. It was the second socket designed for AMD's AMD64 range of processors.

== Availability ==
Socket 939 processors and motherboards became available in June 2004, and were superseded by Socket AM2 in May 2006. AMD has ceased the production of this socket.

A few motherboards were released after the socket was phased out in 2006. In 2007, ASRock released the ALiveDualeSATA2, which was a native AM2 motherboard with an adaptor for socket 939 CPUs called the 939CPU Board. It offered both AGP 8x and PCIe 16x. Additional releases in 2007 include the Jetway 939GT4-SLI-G and Biostar N61PC-M9. In 2009, ASRock released the yet another 939 motherboard, the 939A785GMH. It utilized the AMD 785G IGP chipset and a SB710 southbridge.

Both single and dual-core processors were manufactured for this socket under the Athlon 64, Athlon 64 FX, Athlon 64 X2, Sempron and Opteron names. The Opteron 190, featuring a 2.8 GHz clock speed and 1 MB of Level 2 cache per core, was the fastest dual-core processor manufactured for this socket, however the availability of this processor was limited. The Opteron 185 (locked multiplier) and Athlon 64 FX-60 (unlocked multiplier), with a slightly slower clock speed of 2.6 GHz, were the fastest widely available dual-core processors for the socket. The Opteron 156 ran slightly faster at 3 GHz, making it the fastest single core processor supporting the socket 939 interface.

== Technical specifications ==
Socket 939 supports dual channel DDR SDRAM memory, with 6.4 GB/s memory bandwidth. Processors for this socket support 3DNow!, SSE2, and SSE3 (revision E or later) instruction sets. It features one 16 bit HyperTransport link running up to 1000 MT/s.

Socket 939 motherboards can be found with both AGP and PCIe slots. Unlike more modern motherboards with multiple PCIe slots, AGP and PCIe can not be used simultaneously for graphics output. A similar design featuring both AGP and PCIe can be found with some LGA 775 motherboards as well, like the VIA PT880 Pro chipset.

Processors using this socket have 64KB each Level 1 instruction and data caches, and either 128KB, 256KB, 512KB or 1 MB Level 2 cache.

== See also ==
- List of AMD microprocessors
