= SSE3 =

CPU instruction set

SSE3, Streaming SIMD Extensions 3, also known by its Intel code name Prescott New Instructions (PNI), is the third iteration of the SSE instruction set for the IA-32 (x86) architecture. Intel introduced SSE3 in 2004 with the Prescott revision of their Pentium 4 and Celeron D CPUs. In April 2005, AMD introduced a subset of SSE3 in revision E (Venice and San Diego) of their Athlon 64 CPUs. The earlier SIMD instruction sets on the x86 platform, from oldest to newest, are MMX, 3DNow! (developed by AMD, no longer supported on newer CPUs), SSE, and SSE2.

SSE3 contains 13 new instructions over SSE2.

== Changes ==
The most notable change is the capability to work horizontally in a register, as opposed to the more or less strictly vertical operation of all previous SSE instructions. More specifically, instructions to add and subtract the multiple values stored within a single register have been added. These instructions can be used to speed up the implementation of a number of DSP and 3D operations. There is also a new instruction to convert floating point values to integers without having to change the global rounding mode, thus avoiding costly pipeline stalls. Finally, the extension adds LDDQU, an alternative misaligned integer vector load that has better performance on NetBurst based platforms for loads that cross cacheline boundaries.

== CPUs with SSE3 ==
- AMD:
  - Opteron (since Stepping E4)
  - Sempron (since Palermo. Stepping E3)
  - Athlon 64 (since Venice Stepping E3 and San Diego Stepping E4)
  - Athlon 64 FX (since San Diego Stepping E4)
  - Athlon 64 X2
  - Phenom 64 X2
  - Athlon II & Phenom II
  - Turion family
  - K10 family
  - APU family (including without GPU)
  - FX Series
  - Zen family
- Intel:
  - Celeron D
  - Celeron (starting with Core microarchitecture)
  - Pentium 4 (since Prescott)
  - Pentium D
  - Pentium Extreme Edition (except Pentium 4 Extreme Edition)
  - Pentium Dual-Core
  - Pentium (starting with Core microarchitecture)
  - Core
  - Xeon (since Nocona)
  - Atom
- VIA/Centaur:
  - C7
  - Nano
- Transmeta Efficeon TM88xx with Code Morphing software update (except model numbers TM86xx)

== New instructions ==
=== Common instructions ===
==== Arithmetic ====
ADDSUBPD
Add-Subtract-Packed-Double
- Input: { A0, A1 }, { B0, B1 }
- Output: { A0 − B0, A1 + B1 }
ADDSUBPS
Add-Subtract-Packed-Single
- Input: { A0, A1, A2, A3 }, { B0, B1, B2, B3 }
- Output: { A0 − B0, A1 + B1, A2 − B2, A3 + B3 }

==== AOS ( Array Of Structures ) ====
HADDPD
Horizontal-Add-Packed-Double
- Input: { A0, A1 }, { B0, B1 }
- Output: { A0 + A1, B0 + B1 }
HADDPS
Horizontal-Add-Packed-Single
- Input: { A0, A1, A2, A3 }, { B0, B1, B2, B3 }
- Output: { A0 + A1, A2 + A3, B0 + B1, B2 + B3 }
HSUBPD
Horizontal-Subtract-Packed-Double
- Input: { A0, A1 }, { B0, B1 }
- Output: { A0 − A1, B0 − B1 }
HSUBPS
Horizontal-Subtract-Packed-Single
- Input: { A0, A1, A2, A3 }, { B0, B1, B2, B3 }
- Output: { A0 − A1, A2 − A3, B0 − B1, B2 − B3 }
LDDQU
As stated above, this is an alternative misaligned integer vector load. It can be helpful for video compression tasks.
MOVDDUP, MOVSHDUP, MOVSLDUP
These are useful for complex numbers and wave calculation like sound.
FISTTP
Like the older x87 FISTP instruction, but ignores the floating point control register's rounding mode settings and uses the "chop" (truncate) mode instead. Allows omission of the expensive loading and re-loading of the control register in languages such as C where float-to-int conversion requires truncate behaviour by standard.

=== Other instructions ===
MONITOR, MWAIT
The MONITOR instruction is used to specify a memory address for monitoring, while the MWAIT instruction puts the processor into a low-power state and waits for a write event to the monitored address.
