= Thermal design power =

Amount of heat a computer's cooling system must dissipate

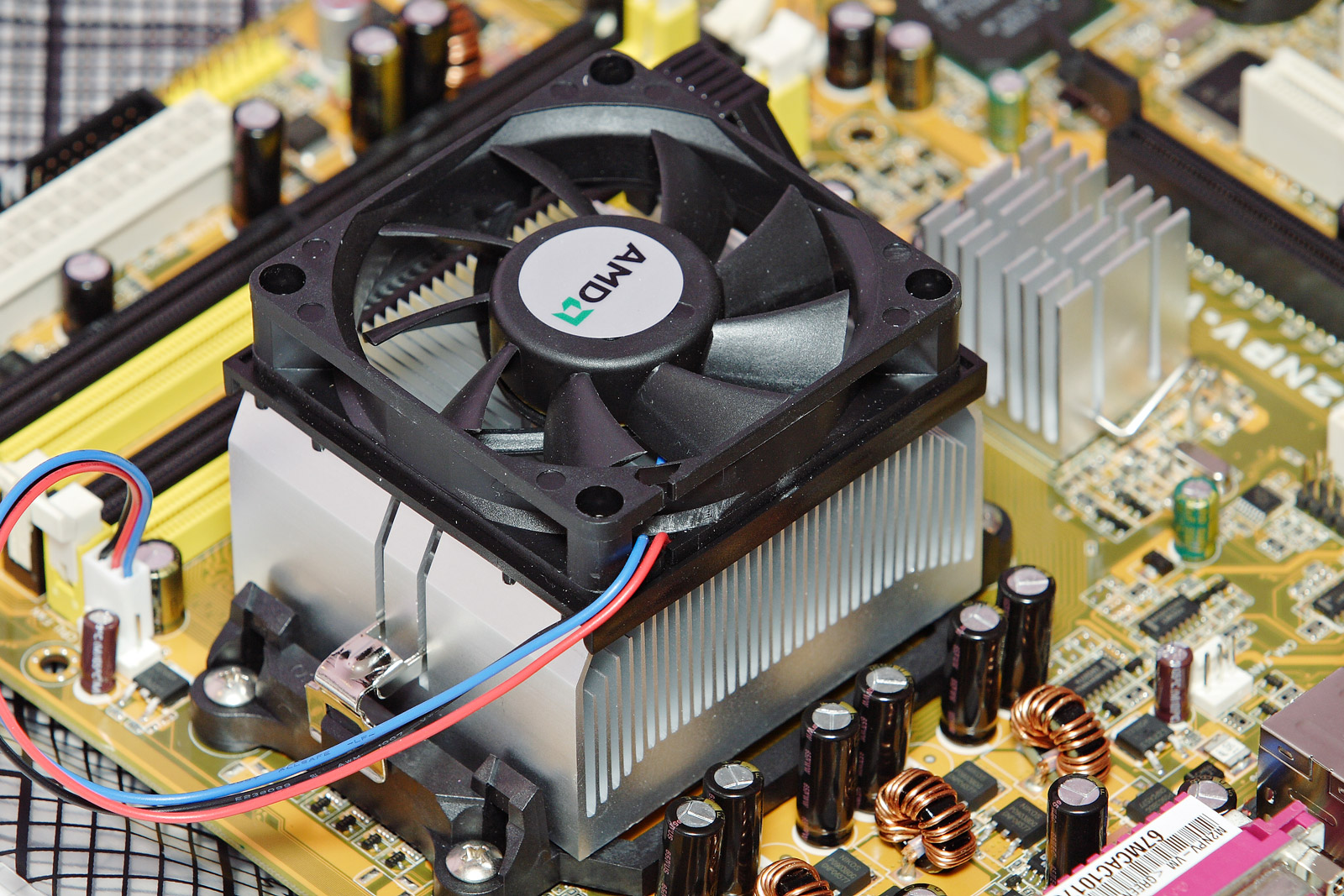
Heatsink mounted on a motherboard, cooling the CPU underneath it. This heatsink is designed with the cooling capacity matching the CPU’s TDP.

Thermal design power (TDP), also known as thermal design point, is the maximum amount of heat that a computer component (CPU, GPU, or system on chip) can generate and that its cooling system is designed to dissipate during normal operation at a non-turbo clock rate (base frequency).

Some sources state that the peak power rating for a microprocessor is usually 1.5 times the TDP rating. Graphics processing units are known to have even larger discrepancies between peak and TDP.

== Calculation ==
ACP compared to TDP
ACP	TDP
40 W	60 W
55 W	79 W
75 W	115 W
105 W	137 W

The average CPU power (ACP) is the power consumption of central processing units, especially server processors, under "average" daily usage as defined by Advanced Micro Devices (AMD) for use in its line of processors based on the K10 microarchitecture (Opteron 8300 and 2300 series processors). Intel's thermal design power (TDP), used for Pentium and Core 2 processors, measures the energy consumption under high workload; it is numerically somewhat higher than the "average" ACP rating of the same processor.

According to AMD the ACP rating includes the power consumption when running several benchmarks, including TPC-C, SPECcpu2006, SPECjbb2005 and STREAM Benchmark (memory bandwidth), which AMD said is an appropriate method of power consumption measurement for data centers and server-intensive workload environments. AMD said that the ACP and TDP values of the processors will both be stated and do not replace one another. Barcelona and later server processors have the two power figures.

The TDP of a CPU has been underestimated in some cases, leading to certain real applications (typically strenuous, such as video encoding or games) causing the CPU to exceed its specified TDP and resulting in overloading the computer's cooling system. In this case, CPUs either cause a system failure (a "therm-trip") or throttle their speed down. Most modern processors will cause a therm-trip only upon a catastrophic cooling failure, such as a no longer operational fan or an incorrectly mounted heat sink.

For example, a laptop's CPU cooling system may be designed for a 20 W TDP, which means that it can dissipate up to 20 watts of heat without exceeding the maximum junction temperature for the laptop's CPU. A cooling system can do this using an active cooling method (e.g. conduction coupled with forced convection) such as a heat sink with a fan, or any of the two passive cooling methods: thermal radiation or conduction. Typically, a combination of these methods is used.

Since safety margins and the definition of what constitutes a real application vary among manufacturers, TDP values between different manufacturers cannot be accurately compared (a processor with a TDP of, for example, 100 W will almost certainly use more power at full load than processors with a fraction of said TDP, and very probably more than processors with lower TDP from the same manufacturer, but it may or may not use more power than a processor from a different manufacturer with a not excessively lower TDP, such as 90 W). Additionally, TDPs are often specified for families of processors, with the low-end models usually using significantly less power than those at the high end of the family.

Until around 2006 AMD used to report the maximum power draw of its processors as TDP. Intel changed this practice with the introduction of its Conroe family of processors. Intel calculates a specified chip's TDP according to the amount of power the computer's fan and heatsink need to be able to dissipate while the chip is under sustained load. Actual power usage can be higher or (much) lower than TDP, but the figure is intended to give guidance to engineers designing cooling solutions for their products. In particular, Intel's measurement also does not fully take into account Intel Turbo Boost due to the default time limits, while AMD does because AMD Turbo Core always tries to push for the maximum power.

== Multiple TDPs ==
TDP specifications for some processors may allow them to work under multiple different power levels, depending on the usage scenario, available cooling capacities and desired power consumption. Technologies that provide such variable TDPs include Intel's configurable TDP (cTDP) and scenario design power (SDP), and AMD's TDP power cap.

Configurable TDP (cTDP), also known as programmable TDP or TDP power cap, is an operating mode of later generations of Intel mobile processors (as of January 2014) and AMD processors (as of June 2012) that allows adjustments in their TDP values. By modifying the processor behavior and its performance levels, power consumption of a processor can be changed altering its TDP at the same time. That way, a processor can operate at higher or lower performance levels, depending on the available cooling capacities and desired power consumption.

cTDP typically provide (but are not limited to) three operating modes:

- Nominal TDP – the processor's rated frequency and TDP.
- cTDP down – when a cooler or quieter mode of operation is desired, this mode specifies a lower TDP and lower guaranteed frequency versus the nominal mode.
- cTDP up – when extra cooling is available, this mode specifies a higher TDP and higher guaranteed frequency versus the nominal mode.

For example, some of the mobile Haswell processors support cTDP up, cTDP down, or both modes. As another example, some of the AMD Opteron processors and Kaveri APUs can be configured for lower TDP values. IBM's POWER8 processor implements a similar power capping functionality through its embedded on-chip controller (OCC).

Intel introduced scenario design power (SDP) for some low power Y-series processors in 2013. It is described as "an additional thermal reference point meant to represent thermally relevant device usage in real-world environmental scenarios." As a power rating, SDP is not an additional power state of a processor; it states the average power consumption of a processor using a certain mix of benchmark programs to simulate "real-world" scenarios.

== Ambiguities of the thermal design power parameter ==
As some authors and users have observed, the thermal design power (TDP) rating is an ambiguous parameter. In fact, different manufacturers define the TDP using different calculation methods and different operating conditions, keeping these details almost undisclosed (with very few exceptions). This makes it highly problematic (if not impossible) to reasonably compare similar devices made by different manufacturers based on their TDP, and to optimize the design of a cooling system in terms of both heat management and cost.

=== Thermal management fundamentals ===
To better understand the problem we must remember the basic concepts underlying thermal management and computer cooling. Let’s consider the thermal conduction path from the CPU case to the ambient air through a Heat sink, with:

Pd (Watt) = thermal power generated by a CPU and to be dissipated into the ambient through a suitable Heat sink. It corresponds to the total power drain from the direct current supply rails of the CPU.
Rca (°C/W) = thermal resistance of the heat sink, between the case of the CPU and the ambient air.
Tc (°C) = maximum allowed temperature of the CPU's case (ensuring full performances).
Ta (°C) = maximum expected ambient temperature at the inlet of the heat sink fan.

All these parameters are linked together by the following equation:

$$(Tc-Ta)=Pd \cdot Rca$$

Hence, once we know the thermal power to be dissipated (Pd), the maximum allowed case temperature (Tc) of the CPU and the maximum expected ambient temperature (Ta) of the air entering the cooling fans, we can determine the fundamental characteristics of the required heat sink, i.e. its thermal resistance Rca, as:

$$Rca=\frac {(Tc-Ta)}{Pd}$$

This equation can be rearranged by writing

$$Pd=\frac{(Tc-Ta)}{ Rca}$$

where in Pd can replaced by the thermal design power (TDP).

Note that the heat dissipation path going from the CPU to the ambient air flowing through the printed circuit of the motherboard has a thermal resistance that is orders of magnitude greater than that of the Heat sink, therefore it can be neglected in these computations.

=== Issues when dealing with the thermal design power (TDP) ===
Once all the input data is known, the previous formula allows to choose a CPU’s heat sink with a suitable thermal resistance Rca between case and ambient air, sufficient to keep the maximum case temperature at or below a predefined value Tc.

On the contrary, when dealing with the Thermal Design Power (TDP), ambiguities arise because the CPU manufacturers usually do not disclose the exact conditions under which this parameter has been defined. The maximum acceptable case temperature Tc to get the rated performances is usually missing, as well as the corresponding ambient temperature Ta, and, last but not least, details about the specific computational test workload.

For instance, an Intel’s general support page states briefly that the TDP refers to "the power consumption under the maximum theoretical load". Here they also inform that starting from the 12th generation of their CPUs the term thermal design power (TDP) has been replaced with processor base power (PBP). In a support page dedicated to the Core i7-7700 processor, Intel defines the TDP as the maximum amount of heat that a processor can produce when running real life applications, without telling what these "real life applications" are. Another example: in a 2011 white paper where the Xeon processors are compared with AMD’s competing devices, Intel defines TDP as the upper point of the thermal profile measured at maximum case temperature, but without specifying what this temperature should be (nor the computing load). All these definitions imply that the CPU is running at the base clock rate (non-turbo).

In conclusion:

- Comparing the TDP between devices of different manufacturers is not very meaningful.
- The selection of a heat sink may end up with overheating (and CPU reduced performances) or overcooling (oversized, expensive heat sink ), depending if one chooses a too high or a too low case temperature Tc (respectively with a too low or too high ambient temperature Ta), or if the CPU operates with different computational loads.
- A possible approach to ensure a long life of a CPU is to ask the manufacturer the recommended maximum case temperature Tc and then to oversize the cooling system. For instance, a safety margin taking into account some turbo overclocking could consider a thermal power that is 1.5 times the rated TDP. In any case, the lower is the silicon junction temperature, the longer will be the lifespan of the device, according to an acceleration factor very roughly expressed by means of the Arrhenius equation.

=== Some disclosed details of AMD’s thermal design power (TDP) ===
In October 2019, the GamersNexus hardware guides showed a table with case and ambient temperature values that they got directly from AMD, describing the TDPs of some Ryzen 5, 7 and 9 CPUs. The formula relating all these parameters, given by AMD, is the usual

$$TDP=(Tc-Ta)/Rca$$

The declared TPDs of these devices range from 65 W to 105 W; the ambient temperature considered by AMD is +42°C, and the case temperatures range from +61.8 °C to +69.3°C, while the case-to-ambient thermal resistances range from 0.189 to 0.420 °C/W.

== See also ==
- AMD Turbo Core
- Heat generation in integrated circuits
- Intel Turbo Boost
- Operating temperature
- Power rating
