= List of Intel Xeon processors =

Logo since 2020

The following is a list of Intel Xeon microprocessors, by generation.

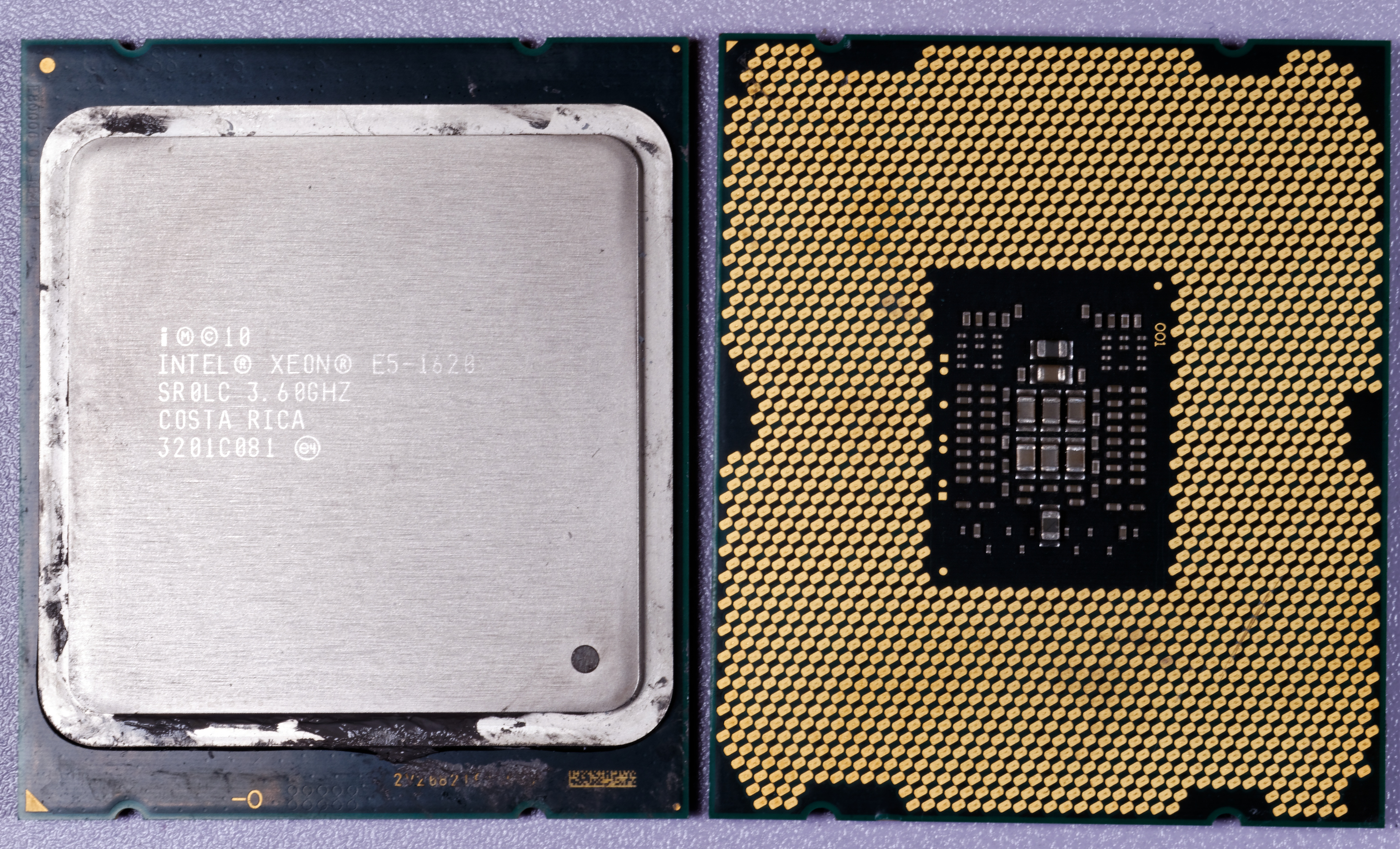
Intel Xeon E5-1620, top and bottom

== P6-based ==
=== Pentium II Xeon ===
- Pentium II Xeon 400
- Pentium II Xeon 400
- Pentium II Xeon 450
- Pentium II Xeon 450
- Pentium II Xeon 450

=== Pentium III Xeon ===
- Pentium III Xeon 500
- Pentium III Xeon 500
- Pentium III Xeon 500
- Pentium III Xeon 550
- Pentium III Xeon 550
- Pentium III Xeon 550
- Pentium III Xeon 600
- Pentium III Xeon 667
- Pentium III Xeon 700
- Pentium III Xeon 700
- Pentium III Xeon 733
- Pentium III Xeon 800
- Pentium III Xeon 866
- Pentium III Xeon 900
- Pentium III Xeon 933
- Pentium III Xeon 1.00

== NetBurst-based ==
=== Xeon UP/DP ===
- Xeon 1.4
- Xeon 1.5
- Xeon 1.7
- Xeon 2.0
- Xeon 1.8
- Xeon 2.0A
- Xeon 2.0B
- Xeon 2.2
- Xeon 2.4
- Xeon 2.4B
- Xeon 2.6
- Xeon 2.66
- Xeon 2.8
- Xeon 2.8B
- Xeon 3.0
- Xeon 3.06
- Xeon LV 1.6
- Xeon LV 2.0
- Xeon LV 2.4
- Xeon 2.4B
- Xeon 2.8B
- Xeon 3.06
- Xeon 3.2
- Xeon 3.2
- Xeon 2.8
- Xeon 2.8D
- Xeon 3.0
- Xeon 3.0D
- Xeon 3.2
- Xeon 3.4
- Xeon 3.6
- Xeon LV 2.8
- Xeon 2.8
- Xeon 2.8E
- Xeon 3.0
- Xeon 3.0E
- Xeon 3.2
- Xeon 3.2E
- Xeon 3.4
- Xeon 3.4E
- Xeon 3.6
- Xeon 3.6E
- Xeon 3.8
- Xeon 3.8E
- Xeon MV 3.2
- Xeon LV 3.0
- Xeon 2.8
- Xeon 5020
- Xeon 5030
- Xeon 5040
- Xeon 5050
- Xeon 5060
- Xeon 5070
- Xeon 5080
- Xeon MV 5063

=== Xeon MP ===
- Xeon MP 1.4
- Xeon MP 1.5
- Xeon MP 1.6
- Xeon MP 1.5
- Xeon MP 1.9
- Xeon MP 2.0
- Xeon MP 2.0
- Xeon MP 2.2
- Xeon MP 2.5
- Xeon MP 2.7
- Xeon MP 2.8
- Xeon MP 3.0
- Xeon MP 3.16
- Xeon MP 3.66
- Xeon MP 2.83
- Xeon MP 3.0
- Xeon MP 3.33
- Xeon 7020
- Xeon 7030
- Xeon 7040
- Xeon 7041
- Xeon 7110N
- Xeon 7110M
- Xeon 7120N
- Xeon 7120M
- Xeon 7130N
- Xeon 7130M
- Xeon 7140N
- Xeon 7140M
- Xeon 7150N

== Pentium M (Yonah)-based ==
=== Xeon DP ===
- Xeon LV 1.66
- Xeon LV 2.0
- Xeon LV 2.16
- Xeon ULV 1.66

== Core-based ==
=== Xeon 3000 series ===
- Xeon 3040
- Xeon 3050
- Xeon 3060
- Xeon 3065
- Xeon 3070
- Xeon 3075
- Xeon 3085
- Xeon L3014
- Xeon E3113
- Xeon E3110
- Xeon E3120
- Xeon L3110
- Xeon X3210
- Xeon X3220
- Xeon X3230
- Xeon X3320
- Xeon X3330
- Xeon X3350
- Xeon X3360
- Xeon X3370
- Xeon X3380
- Xeon L3360
- Xeon X3323
- Xeon X3353
- Xeon X3363

=== Xeon 5000 series ===
- Xeon 5110
- Xeon 5120
- Xeon 5130
- Xeon 5140
- Xeon 5150
- Xeon 5160
- Xeon LV 5113
- Xeon LV 5128
- Xeon LV 5133
- Xeon LV 5138
- Xeon LV 5148
- Xeon E5205
- Xeon E5220
- Xeon E5240
- Xeon X5260
- Xeon X5270
- Xeon X5272
- Xeon L5215
- Xeon L5238
- Xeon L5240
- Xeon L5248
- Xeon E5310
- Xeon E5320
- Xeon E5330
- Xeon E5335
- Xeon E5340
- Xeon E5345
- Xeon E5350, X5350
- Xeon X5355
- Xeon X5365
- Xeon L5310
- Xeon L5318
- Xeon L5320
- Xeon L5335
- Xeon E5405
- Xeon E5410
- Xeon E5420
- Xeon E5430
- Xeon E5440
- Xeon E5450
- Xeon X5450
- Xeon X5460
- Xeon E5462
- Xeon X5470
- Xeon E5472
- Xeon X5472
- Xeon X5482
- Xeon X5492
- Xeon L5408
- Xeon L5410
- Xeon L5420
- Xeon L5430

=== Xeon 7000 series ===
- Xeon E7210
- Xeon E7220
- Xeon E7310
- Xeon E7320
- Xeon E7330
- Xeon E7340
- Xeon X7350
- Xeon L7345
- Xeon E7420
- Xeon E7430
- Xeon E7440
- Xeon L7445
- Xeon E7450
- Xeon E7458
- Xeon X7460
- Xeon L7455

== Nehalem-based ==
=== Xeon 3000 series ===
- Xeon X3430
- Xeon X3440
- Xeon X3450
- Xeon X3460
- Xeon X3470
- Xeon X3480
- Xeon L3426
- Xeon W3503
- Xeon W3505
- Xeon W3520
- Xeon W3530
- Xeon W3540
- Xeon W3550
- Xeon W3565
- Xeon W3570
- Xeon W3580
- Xeon LC3518
- Xeon LC3528
- Xeon EC3539
- Xeon L3403
- Xeon L3406
- Xeon W3670
- Xeon W3680
- Xeon W3690

=== Xeon 5000 series ===
- Xeon E5502
- Xeon E5503
- Xeon L5508
- Xeon E5504
- Xeon E5506
- Xeon E5507
- Xeon E5520
- Xeon E5530
- Xeon E5540
- Xeon X5550
- Xeon X5560
- Xeon X5570
- Xeon W5580
- Xeon W5590
- Xeon L5506
- Xeon L5518
- Xeon L5520
- Xeon L5530
- Xeon EC5539
- Xeon EC5509
- Xeon EC5549
- Xeon LC5518
- Xeon LC5528
- Xeon X5698
- Xeon E5603
- Xeon E5606
- Xeon E5607
- Xeon E5620
- Xeon E5630
- Xeon E5640
- Xeon X5647
- Xeon X5667
- Xeon X5672
- Xeon X5677
- Xeon X5687
- Xeon L5609
- Xeon L5618
- Xeon L5630
- Xeon E5645
- Xeon E5649
- Xeon X5650
- Xeon X5660
- Xeon X5670
- Xeon X5675
- Xeon X5679
- Xeon X5680
- Xeon X5690
- Xeon L5638
- Xeon L5639
- Xeon L5640
- Xeon L5645

=== Xeon 6000 series ===
- Xeon E6510

=== Xeon 7000 series ===
- Xeon E7520
- Xeon E7530
- Xeon E6540
- Xeon E7540
- Xeon X7542
- Xeon L7545
- Xeon X6550
- Xeon X7550
- Xeon X7560
- Xeon L7555

=== Xeon E7 ===
- Xeon E7-2803
- Xeon E7-4807
- Xeon E7-2820
- Xeon E7-2830
- Xeon E7-4820
- Xeon E7-4830
- Xeon E7-8830
- Xeon E7-8837
- Xeon E7-2850
- Xeon E7-2860
- Xeon E7-2870
- Xeon E7-4850
- Xeon E7-4860
- Xeon E7-4870
- Xeon E7-8850
- Xeon E7-8860
- Xeon E7-8870
- Xeon E7-8867L

== Sandy Bridge-based ==
=== Xeon E3 ===
- Xeon E3-1105C
- Xeon E3-1125C
- Xeon E3-1220
- Xeon E3-1220L
- Xeon E3-1225
- Xeon E3-1230
- Xeon E3-1235
- Xeon E3-1240
- Xeon E3-1245
- Xeon E3-1260L
- Xeon E3-1265L
- Xeon E3-1270
- Xeon E3-1275
- Xeon E3-1280
- Xeon E3-1290

=== Xeon E5 ===
- Xeon E5-1410
- Xeon E5-1428L
- Xeon E5-2403
- Xeon E5-2407
- Xeon E5-2418L
- Xeon E5-2420
- Xeon E5-2428L
- Xeon E5-2430
- Xeon E5-2430L
- Xeon E5-2440
- Xeon E5-2448L
- Xeon E5-2449L
- Xeon E5-2450
- Xeon E5-2450L
- Xeon E5-2470
- Xeon E5-1603
- Xeon E5-1607
- Xeon E5-1620
- Xeon E5-1650
- Xeon E5-1660
- Xeon E5-2637
- Xeon E5-2603
- Xeon E5-2609
- Xeon E5-2618L
- Xeon E5-2620
- Xeon E5-2628L
- Xeon E5-2630
- Xeon E5-2630L
- Xeon E5-2640
- Xeon E5-2643
- Xeon E5-2648L
- Xeon E5-2650
- Xeon E5-2650L
- Xeon E5-2658
- Xeon E5-2660
- Xeon E5-2665
- Xeon E5-2667
- Xeon E5-2670
- Xeon E5-2680
- Xeon E5-2687W
- Xeon E5-2689
- Xeon E5-2690
- Xeon E5-4603
- Xeon E5-4607
- Xeon E5-4610
- Xeon E5-4617
- Xeon E5-4620
- Xeon E5-4640
- Xeon E5-4650
- Xeon E5-4650L

== Ivy Bridge-based ==
=== Xeon E3 v2 ===
- Xeon E3-1105C v2
- Xeon E3-1125C v2
- Xeon E3-1135C v2
- Xeon E3-1220L v2
- Xeon E3-1220 v2
- Xeon E3-1225 v2
- Xeon E3-1230 v2
- Xeon E3-1240 v2
- Xeon E3-1245 v2
- Xeon E3-1270 v2
- Xeon E3-1275 v2
- Xeon E3-1280 v2
- Xeon E3-1285 v2
- Xeon E3-1290 v2
- Xeon E3-1265L v2
- Xeon E3-1285L v2

=== Xeon E5 v2 ===
- Xeon E5-1410 v2
- Xeon E5-1428L v2
- Xeon E5-2403 v2
- Xeon E5-2407 v2
- Xeon E5-2420 v2
- Xeon E5-2430 v2
- Xeon E5-2418L v2
- Xeon E5-2430L v2
- Xeon E5-2440 v2
- Xeon E5-2450 v2
- Xeon E5-2428L v2
- Xeon E5-2470 v2
- Xeon E5-2448L v2
- Xeon E5-2450L v2
- Xeon E5-1607 v2
- Xeon E5-1620 v2
- Xeon E5-1650 v2
- Xeon E5-1660 v2
- Xeon E5-1680 v2
- Xeon E5-2603 v2
- Xeon E5-2609 v2
- Xeon E5-2637 v2
- Xeon E5-2620 v2
- Xeon E5-2630 v2
- Xeon E5-2643 v2
- Xeon E5-2618L v2
- Xeon E5-2630L v2
- Xeon E5-2640 v2
- Xeon E5-2650 v2
- Xeon E5-2667 v2
- Xeon E5-2673 v2
- Xeon E5-2687W v2
- Xeon E5-2628L v2
- Xeon E5-2658 v2
- Xeon E5-2660 v2
- Xeon E5-2670 v2
- Xeon E5-2680 v2
- Xeon E5-2690 v2
- Xeon E5-2648L v2
- Xeon E5-2650L v2
- Xeon E5-2651 v2
- Xeon E5-2692 v2
- Xeon E5-2695 v2
- Xeon E5-2696 v2
- Xeon E5-2697 v2
- Xeon E5-4603 v2
- Xeon E5-4607 v2
- Xeon E5-4610 v2
- Xeon E5-4620 v2
- Xeon E5-4627 v2
- Xeon E5-4624L v2
- Xeon E5-4640 v2
- Xeon E5-4650 v2
- Xeon E5-4657L v2

=== Xeon E7 v2 ===
- Xeon E7-2850 v2
- Xeon E7-2870 v2
- Xeon E7-2880 v2
- Xeon E7-2890 v2
- Xeon E7-4809 v2
- Xeon E7-4820 v2
- Xeon E7-4830 v2
- Xeon E7-4850 v2
- Xeon E7-4860 v2
- Xeon E7-4870 v2
- Xeon E7-4880 v2
- Xeon E7-4890 v2
- Xeon E7-8893 v2
- Xeon E7-8891 v2
- Xeon E7-8850 v2
- Xeon E7-8857 v2
- Xeon E7-8870 v2
- Xeon E7-8880 v2
- Xeon E7-8880L v2
- Xeon E7-8890 v2
- Xeon E7-8895 v2

== Haswell-based ==
=== Xeon E3 v3 ===
- Xeon E3-1220L v3
- Xeon E3-1220 v3
- Xeon E3-1225 v3
- Xeon E3-1226 v3
- Xeon E3-1230 v3
- Xeon E3-1231 v3
- Xeon E3-1240 v3
- Xeon E3-1241 v3
- Xeon E3-1245 v3
- Xeon E3-1246 v3
- Xeon E3-1270 v3
- Xeon E3-1271 v3
- Xeon E3-1275 v3
- Xeon E3-1276 v3
- Xeon E3-1280 v3
- Xeon E3-1281 v3
- Xeon E3-1285 v3
- Xeon E3-1286 v3
- Xeon E3-1265L v3
- Xeon E3-1268L v3
- Xeon E3-1275L v3
- Xeon E3-1284L v3
- Xeon E3-1285L v3
- Xeon E3-1286L v3
- Xeon E3-1230L v3
- Xeon E3-1240L v3

=== Xeon E5 v3 ===
- Xeon E5-1428L v3
- Xeon E5-2408L v3
- Xeon E5-2418L v3
- Xeon E5-2428L v3
- Xeon E5-2438L v3
- Xeon E5-1603 v3
- Xeon E5-1607 v3
- Xeon E5-1620 v3
- Xeon E5-1630 v3
- Xeon E5-1650 v3
- Xeon E5-1660 v3
- Xeon E5-1680 v3
- Xeon E5-1681 v3
- Xeon E5-1686 v3
- Xeon E5-1691 v3
- Xeon E5-2623 v3
- Xeon E5-2637 v3
- Xeon E5-2603 v3
- Xeon E5-2608L v3
- Xeon E5-2609 v3
- Xeon E5-2620 v3
- Xeon E5-2643 v3
- Xeon E5-2618L v3
- Xeon E5-2622 v3
- Xeon E5-2628 v3
- Xeon E5-2629 v3
- Xeon E5-2630 v3
- Xeon E5-2630L v3
- Xeon E5-2640 v3
- Xeon E5-2667 v3
- Xeon E5-2628L v3
- Xeon E5-2649 v3
- Xeon E5-2650 v3
- Xeon E5-2652 v3
- Xeon E5-2660 v3
- Xeon E5-2663 v3
- Xeon E5-2666 v3
- Xeon E5-2687W v3
- Xeon E5-2648L v3
- Xeon E5-2650L v3
- Xeon E5-2658 v3
- Xeon E5-2658A v3
- Xeon E5-2669 v3
- Xeon E5-2670 v3
- Xeon E5-2673 v3
- Xeon E5-2676 v3
- Xeon E5-2678 v3
- Xeon E5-2680 v3
- Xeon E5-2685 v3
- Xeon E5-2690 v3
- Xeon E5-2692 v3
- Xeon E5-2693 v3 (ES)
- Xeon E5-2683 v3
- Xeon E5-2695 v3
- Xeon E5-2697 v3
- Xeon E5-2675 v3
- Xeon E5-2698 v3
- Xeon E5-2698A v3
- Xeon E5-2698B v3
- Xeon E5-2686 v3
- Xeon E5-2696 v3
- Xeon E5-2699 v3
- Xeon E5-4655 v3
- Xeon E5-4610 v3
- Xeon E5-4620 v3
- Xeon E5-4627 v3
- Xeon E5-4640 v3
- Xeon E5-4648 v3
- Xeon E5-4650 v3
- Xeon E5-4660 v3
- Xeon E5-4667 v3
- Xeon E5-4669 v3

=== Xeon E7 v3 ===
- Xeon E7-4809 v3
- Xeon E7-4820 v3
- Xeon E7-4830 v3
- Xeon E7-4850 v3
- Xeon E7-8893 v3
- Xeon E7-8891 v3
- Xeon E7-8860 v3
- Xeon E7-8867 v3
- Xeon E7-8870 v3
- Xeon E7-8880 v3
- Xeon E7-8880L v3
- Xeon E7-8890 v3
- Xeon E7-8895 v3

== Broadwell-based ==
=== Xeon D ===
- Xeon D-1513N
- Xeon D-1518
- Xeon D-1520
- Xeon D-1521
- Xeon D-1523N
- Xeon D-1527
- Xeon D-1529
- Xeon D-1528
- Xeon D-1531
- Xeon D-1533N
- Xeon D-1537
- Xeon D-1539
- Xeon D-1540
- Xeon D-1541
- Xeon D-1543N
- Xeon D-1548
- Xeon D-1553N
- Xeon D-1557
- Xeon D-1559
- Xeon D-1567
- Xeon D-1571
- Xeon D-1577
- Xeon D-1581
- Xeon D-1587
- Xeon D-1602
- Xeon D-1622
- Xeon D-1627
- Xeon D-1637
- Xeon D-1623N
- Xeon D-1633N
- Xeon D-1649N
- Xeon D-1653N

=== Xeon E3 v4 ===
- Xeon E3-1285 v4
- Xeon E3-1258L v4
- Xeon E3-1265L v4
- Xeon E3-1270L v4
- Xeon E3-1278L v4
- Xeon E3-1283L v4
- Xeon E3-1284L v4
- Xeon E3-1285L v4

=== Xeon E5 v4 ===
- Xeon E5-1603 v4
- Xeon E5-1607 v4
- Xeon E5-1620 v4
- Xeon E5-1630 v4
- Xeon E5-1650 v4
- Xeon E5-1660 v4
- Xeon E5-1680 v4
- Xeon E5-2623 v4
- Xeon E5-2637 v4
- Xeon E5-2603 v4
- Xeon E5-2643 v4
- Xeon E5-2608L v4
- Xeon E5-2609 v4
- Xeon E5-2620 v4
- Xeon E5-2667 v4
- Xeon E5-2689A v4
- Xeon E5-2618L v4
- Xeon E5-2630 v4
- Xeon E5-2630L v4
- Xeon E5-2640 v4
- Xeon E5-2689 v4
- Xeon E5-2628L v4
- Xeon E5-2650 v4
- Xeon E5-2666 v4
- Xeon E5-2687W v4
- Xeon E5-2648L v4
- Xeon E5-2650L v4
- Xeon E5-2658 v4
- Xeon E5-2660 v4
- Xeon E5-2680 v4
- Xeon E5-2690 v4
- Xeon AWS-1100 v4
- Xeon E5-2676 v4
- Xeon E5-2682 v4
- Xeon E5-2683 v4
- Xeon E5-2697A v4
- Xeon E5-2686 v4
- Xeon E5-2695 v4
- Xeon E5-2697 v4
- Xeon E5-2673 v4
- Xeon E5-2679 v4
- Xeon E5-2698 v4
- Xeon E5-2696 v4
- Xeon E5-2699 v4
- Xeon E5-2699A v4
- Xeon E5-2699C v4
- Xeon E5-2699R v4
- Xeon E5-2699P v4
- Xeon E5-4610 v4
- Xeon E5-4620 v4
- Xeon E5-4627 v4
- Xeon E5-4628L v4
- Xeon E5-4640 v4
- Xeon E5-4650 v4
- Xeon E5-4655 v4
- Xeon E5-4660 v4
- Xeon E5-4667 v4
- Xeon E5-4669 v4

=== Xeon E7 v4 ===
- Xeon E7-4809 v4
- Xeon E7-4820 v4
- Xeon E7-4830 v4
- Xeon E7-4850 v4
- Xeon E7-8855 v4
- Xeon E7-8860 v4
- Xeon E7-8867 v4
- Xeon E7-8870 v4
- Xeon E7-8880 v4
- Xeon E7-8890 v4
- Xeon E7-8891 v4
- Xeon E7-8893 v4
- Xeon E7-8894 v4

== Skylake-based ==
=== Xeon D ===
- Xeon D-2141I
- Xeon D-2161I
- Xeon D-2191
- Xeon D-2123IT
- Xeon D-2142IT
- Xeon D-2143IT
- Xeon D-2163IT
- Xeon D-2173IT
- Xeon D-2183IT
- Xeon D-2145NT
- Xeon D-2146NT
- Xeon D-2166NT
- Xeon D-2177NT
- Xeon D-2187NT

=== Xeon E3 v5 ===
- Xeon E3-1220 v5
- Xeon E3-1225 v5
- Xeon E3-1230 v5
- Xeon E3-1240 v5
- Xeon E3-1245 v5
- Xeon E3-1270 v5
- Xeon E3-1275 v5
- Xeon E3-1280 v5
- Xeon E3-1260L v5
- Xeon E3-1268L v5
- Xeon E3-1235L v5
- Xeon E3-1240L v5
- Xeon E3-1585 v5
- Xeon E3-1505M v5
- Xeon E3-1515M v5
- Xeon E3-1535M v5
- Xeon E3-1545M v5
- Xeon E3-1575M v5
- Xeon E3-1565L v5
- Xeon E3-1585L v5
- Xeon E3-1505L v5
- Xeon E3-1558L v5
- Xeon E3-1578L v5

=== Xeon W ===
- Xeon W-2102
- Xeon W-2104
- Xeon W-2123
- Xeon W-2125
- Xeon W-2133
- Xeon W-2135
- Xeon W-2140B
- Xeon W-2145
- Xeon W-2150B
- Xeon W-2155
- Xeon W-2175
- Xeon W-2190B
- Xeon W-2195
- Xeon W-3175X

=== Xeon Bronze ===
- Xeon Bronze 3104
- Xeon Bronze 3106

=== Xeon Silver ===
- Xeon Silver 4106H
- Xeon Silver 4108
- Xeon Silver 4109T
- Xeon Silver 4110
- Xeon Silver 4112
- Xeon Silver 4114
- Xeon Silver 4114T
- Xeon Silver 4116
- Xeon Silver 4116T
- Xeon Silver 4123

=== Xeon Gold ===
- Xeon Gold 5115
- Xeon Gold 5117
- Xeon Gold 5117F
- Xeon Gold 5118
- Xeon Gold 5119T
- Xeon Gold 5120
- Xeon Gold 5120T
- Xeon Gold 5122
- Xeon Gold 6122
- Xeon Gold 6126
- Xeon Gold 6126F
- Xeon Gold 6126T
- Xeon Gold 6127M
- Xeon Gold 6128
- Xeon Gold 6130
- Xeon Gold 6130F
- Xeon Gold 6130T
- Xeon Gold 6132
- Xeon Gold 6133
- Xeon Gold 6134
- Xeon Gold 6134M
- Xeon Gold 6135
- Xeon Gold 6135M
- Xeon Gold 6136
- Xeon Gold 6137
- Xeon Gold 6137M
- Xeon Gold 6138
- Xeon Gold 6138F
- Xeon Gold 6138P
- Xeon Gold 6138T
- Xeon Gold 6139
- Xeon Gold 6139M
- Xeon Gold 6140
- Xeon Gold 6140M
- Xeon Gold 6142
- Xeon Gold 6142F
- Xeon Gold 6142M
- Xeon Gold 6143
- Xeon Gold 6144
- Xeon Gold 6145
- Xeon Gold 6146
- Xeon Gold 6148
- Xeon Gold 6148F
- Xeon Gold 6149
- Xeon Gold 6150
- Xeon Gold 6151
- Xeon Gold 6152
- Xeon Gold 6154
- Xeon Gold 6155
- Xeon Gold 6159
- Xeon Gold 6161

=== Xeon Platinum ===
- Xeon Platinum P-8124
- Xeon Platinum 8124M
- Xeon Platinum P-8136
- Xeon Platinum 8153
- Xeon Platinum 8156
- Xeon Platinum 8158
- Xeon Platinum 8160
- Xeon Platinum 8160F
- Xeon Platinum 8160H
- Xeon Platinum 8160M
- Xeon Platinum 8160T
- Xeon Platinum 8163
- Xeon Platinum 8164
- Xeon Platinum 8165
- Xeon Platinum 8167M
- Xeon Platinum 8168
- Xeon Platinum 8170
- Xeon Platinum 8170M
- Xeon Platinum 8171M
- Xeon Platinum 8172M
- Xeon Platinum 8173M
- Xeon Platinum 8174
- Xeon Platinum 8175M
- Xeon Platinum 8176
- Xeon Platinum 8176F
- Xeon Platinum 8176M
- Xeon Platinum 8179M
- Xeon Platinum 8180
- Xeon Platinum 8180M

== Kaby Lake-based ==
=== Xeon E3 v6 ===
- Xeon E3-1205 v6
- Xeon E3-1220 v6
- Xeon E3-1225 v6
- Xeon E3-1230 v6
- Xeon E3-1240 v6
- Xeon E3-1245 v6
- Xeon E3-1270 v6
- Xeon E3-1275 v6
- Xeon E3-1280 v6
- Xeon E3-1285 v6
- Xeon E3-1505M v6
- Xeon E3-1535M v6
- Xeon E3-1501M v6
- Xeon E3-1501L v6
- Xeon E3-1505L v6

== Coffee Lake-based ==
=== Xeon E ===
- Xeon E-2104G
- Xeon E-2124
- Xeon E-2124G
- Xeon E-2126G
- Xeon E-2134
- Xeon E-2136
- Xeon E-2144G
- Xeon E-2146G
- Xeon E-2174G
- Xeon E-2176G
- Xeon E-2186G
- Xeon E-2224
- Xeon E-2224G
- Xeon E-2226G
- Xeon E-2234
- Xeon E-2236
- Xeon E-2244G
- Xeon E-2246G
- Xeon E-2274G
- Xeon E-2276G
- Xeon E-2278G
- Xeon E-2286G
- Xeon E-2288G
- Xeon E-2226GE
- Xeon E-2278GE
- Xeon E-2278GEL
- Xeon E-2176M
- Xeon E-2186M
- Xeon E-2276M
- Xeon E-2286M
- Xeon E-2254ME
- Xeon E-2276ME
- Xeon E-2254ML
- Xeon E-2276ML

== Cascade Lake-based ==
=== Xeon Bronze ===
- Xeon Bronze 3204
- Xeon Bronze 3206R

=== Xeon Silver ===
- Xeon Silver 4208
- Xeon Silver 4209T
- Xeon Silver 4210
- Xeon Silver 4210R
- Xeon Silver 4210T
- Xeon Silver 4214
- Xeon Silver 4214R
- Xeon Silver 4214Y
- Xeon Silver 4215
- Xeon Silver 4215R
- Xeon Silver 4216

=== Xeon Gold ===
- Xeon Gold 5215
- Xeon Gold 5215L
- Xeon Gold 5215M
- Xeon Gold 5217
- Xeon Gold 5218
- Xeon Gold 5218B
- Xeon Gold 5218N
- Xeon Gold 5218T
- Xeon Gold 5219Y
- Xeon Gold 5220
- Xeon Gold 5220R
- Xeon Gold 5220S
- Xeon Gold 5220T
- Xeon Gold 5222
- Xeon Gold 6208U
- Xeon Gold 6209U
- Xeon Gold 6210U
- Xeon Gold 6212U
- Xeon Gold 6222V
- Xeon Gold 6222
- Xeon Gold 6226
- Xeon Gold 6226R
- Xeon Gold 6230
- Xeon Gold 6230N
- Xeon Gold 6230R
- Xeon Gold 6230T
- Xeon Gold 6233
- Xeon Gold 6234
- Xeon Gold 6238
- Xeon Gold 6238L
- Xeon Gold 6238M
- Xeon Gold 6238R
- Xeon Gold 6238T
- Xeon Gold 6240
- Xeon Gold 6240L
- Xeon Gold 6240M
- Xeon Gold 6240R
- Xeon Gold 6240Y
- Xeon Gold 6242
- Xeon Gold 6242R
- Xeon Gold 6244
- Xeon Gold 6246
- Xeon Gold 6246R
- Xeon Gold 6248
- Xeon Gold 6248R
- Xeon Gold 6250
- Xeon Gold 6252
- Xeon Gold 6252N
- Xeon Gold 6254
- Xeon Gold 6258R
- Xeon Gold 6262
- Xeon Gold 6262V
- Xeon Gold 6269Y
- Xeon Gold 6268CL
- Xeon Gold 6278C

=== Xeon Platinum ===
- Xeon Platinum 8222L
- Xeon Platinum 8223CL
- Xeon Platinum 8249C
- Xeon Platinum 8251
- Xeon Platinum 8252C
- Xeon Platinum 8253
- Xeon Platinum 8256
- Xeon Platinum 8259L
- Xeon Platinum 8259CL
- Xeon Platinum 8260
- Xeon Platinum 8260L
- Xeon Platinum 8260M
- Xeon Platinum 8260Y
- Xeon Platinum 8268
- Xeon Platinum 8270
- Xeon Platinum 8274
- Xeon Platinum 8275CL
- Xeon Platinum 8276
- Xeon Platinum 8276L
- Xeon Platinum 8276M
- Xeon Platinum 8280
- Xeon Platinum 8280L
- Xeon Platinum 8280M
- Xeon Platinum 8284
- Xeon Platinum 9221
- Xeon Platinum 9222
- Xeon Platinum 9242
- Xeon Platinum 9282

=== Xeon W ===
- Xeon W-2223
- Xeon W-2225
- Xeon W-2235
- Xeon W-2245
- Xeon W-2255
- Xeon W-2265
- Xeon W-2275
- Xeon W-2295
- Xeon W-3223
- Xeon W-3225
- Xeon W-3235
- Xeon W-3245
- Xeon W-3245M
- Xeon W-3265
- Xeon W-3265M
- Xeon W-3275
- Xeon W-3275M

== Comet Lake-based ==
=== Xeon W ===
- Xeon W-1250
- Xeon W-1250E
- Xeon W-1250P
- Xeon W-1250TE
- Xeon W-1270
- Xeon W-1270E
- Xeon W-1270P
- Xeon W-1270TE
- Xeon W-1290
- Xeon W-1290E
- Xeon W-1290P
- Xeon W-1290T
- Xeon W-1290TE
- Xeon W-10855M
- Xeon W-10885M

== Cooper Lake-based ==
=== Xeon Gold ===
- Xeon Gold 5318H
- Xeon Gold 5320H
- Xeon Gold 6328H
- Xeon Gold 6328HL
- Xeon Gold 6330H
- Xeon Gold 6348H

=== Xeon Platinum ===
- Xeon Platinum 8353H
- Xeon Platinum 8354H
- Xeon Platinum 8356H
- Xeon Platinum 8360H
- Xeon Platinum 8360HL
- Xeon Platinum 8376H
- Xeon Platinum 8376HL
- Xeon Platinum 8380H
- Xeon Platinum 8380HL

== Ice Lake-based ==
=== Xeon D ===
- Xeon D-1702
- Xeon D-1712TR
- Xeon D-1713NT
- Xeon D-1713NTE
- Xeon D-1714
- Xeon D-1715TER
- Xeon D-1718T
- Xeon D-1722NE
- Xeon D-1726
- Xeon D-1732TE
- Xeon D-1733NT
- Xeon D-1734NT
- Xeon D-1735TR
- Xeon D-1736
- Xeon D-1736NT
- Xeon D-1739
- Xeon D-1746TER
- Xeon D-1747NTE
- Xeon D-1748TE
- Xeon D-1749NT
- Xeon D-1813NT
- Xeon D-1823NT
- Xeon D-1834
- Xeon D-1846
- Xeon D-1844NT
- Xeon D-1848TER
- Xeon D-2712T
- Xeon D-2733NT
- Xeon D-2738
- Xeon D-2752NTE
- Xeon D-2752TER
- Xeon D-2753NT
- Xeon D-2766NT
- Xeon D-2775TE
- Xeon D-2776NT
- Xeon D-2779
- Xeon D-2786NTE
- Xeon D-2795NT
- Xeon D-2796NT
- Xeon D-2796TE
- Xeon D-2798NT
- Xeon D-2799
- Xeon D-2832NT
- Xeon D-2843NT
- Xeon D-2876NT
- Xeon D-2896NT
- Xeon D-2896TER
- Xeon D-2899NT

=== Xeon Silver ===
- Xeon Silver 4309Y
- Xeon Silver 4310
- Xeon Silver 4310T
- Xeon Silver 4314
- Xeon Silver 4316

=== Xeon Gold ===
- Xeon Gold 5315Y
- Xeon Gold 5317
- Xeon Gold 5318N
- Xeon Gold 5318S
- Xeon Gold 5318Y
- Xeon Gold 5320
- Xeon Gold 5320T
- Xeon Gold 6326
- Xeon Gold 6330
- Xeon Gold 6330N
- Xeon Gold 6334
- Xeon Gold 6336Y
- Xeon Gold 6338
- Xeon Gold 6338N
- Xeon Gold 6338T
- Xeon Gold 6342
- Xeon Gold 6346
- Xeon Gold 6348
- Xeon Gold 6354

=== Xeon Platinum ===
- Xeon Platinum 8351N
- Xeon Platinum 8352M
- Xeon Platinum 8352S
- Xeon Platinum 8352V
- Xeon Platinum 8352Y
- Xeon Platinum 8358
- Xeon Platinum 8358P
- Xeon Platinum 8360Y
- Xeon Platinum 8362
- Xeon Platinum 8368
- Xeon Platinum 8368Q
- Xeon Platinum 8380

=== Xeon W ===
- Xeon W-3323
- Xeon W-3335
- Xeon W-3345
- Xeon W-3365
- Xeon W-3375

== Rocket Lake-based ==
=== Xeon E ===
- Xeon E-2314
- Xeon E-2324G
- Xeon E-2334
- Xeon E-2336
- Xeon E-2356G
- Xeon E-2374G
- Xeon E-2378
- Xeon E-2378G
- Xeon E-2386G
- Xeon E-2388G

=== Xeon W ===
- Xeon W-1350
- Xeon W-1350P
- Xeon W-1370
- Xeon W-1370P
- Xeon W-1390
- Xeon W-1390P

== Tiger Lake-based ==
=== Xeon W ===
- Xeon W-11155MLE
- Xeon W-11155MRE
- Xeon W-11555MLE
- Xeon W-11555MRE
- Xeon W-11855M
- Xeon W-11865MLE
- Xeon W-11865MRE
- Xeon W-11955M

== Raptor Lake-based ==
=== Xeon E ===
- Xeon E-2414
- Xeon E-2434
- Xeon E-2436
- Xeon E-2456
- Xeon E-2468
- Xeon E-2486
- Xeon E-2478
- Xeon E-2488

=== Xeon 6 ===
- Xeon 6315P
- Xeon 6325P
- Xeon 6333P
- Xeon 6337P
- Xeon 6349P
- Xeon 6353P
- Xeon 6357P
- Xeon 6369P

== Sapphire Rapids-based ==
=== Xeon Bronze ===
- Xeon Bronze 3408U

=== Xeon Silver ===
- Xeon Silver 4410T
- Xeon Silver 4410Y
- Xeon Silver 4416+

=== Xeon Gold ===
- Xeon Gold 5411N
- Xeon Gold 5412U
- Xeon Gold 5415+
- Xeon Gold 5416S
- Xeon Gold 5418N
- Xeon Gold 5418Y
- Xeon Gold 5420+
- Xeon Gold 6414U
- Xeon Gold 6416H
- Xeon Gold 6418H
- Xeon Gold 6421N
- Xeon Gold 6426Y
- Xeon Gold 6428N
- Xeon Gold 6430
- Xeon Gold 6434
- Xeon Gold 6434H
- Xeon Gold 6438M
- Xeon Gold 6438N
- Xeon Gold 6438Y+
- Xeon Gold 6442Y
- Xeon Gold 6444Y
- Xeon Gold 6448H
- Xeon Gold 6448Y
- Xeon Gold 6454S
- Xeon Gold 6458Q

=== Xeon Platinum ===
- Xeon Platinum 8444H
- Xeon Platinum 8450H
- Xeon Platinum 8452Y
- Xeon Platinum 8454H
- Xeon Platinum 8458P
- Xeon Platinum 8460H
- Xeon Platinum 8460Y+
- Xeon Platinum 8461V
- Xeon Platinum 8462Y+
- Xeon Platinum 8468
- Xeon Platinum 8468H
- Xeon Platinum 8468V
- Xeon Platinum 8470
- Xeon Platinum 8470N
- Xeon Platinum 8470Q
- Xeon Platinum 8471N
- Xeon Platinum 8480+
- Xeon Platinum 8490H

=== Xeon Max ===
- Xeon Max 9460
- Xeon Max 9462
- Xeon Max 9468
- Xeon Max 9470
- Xeon Max 9480

=== Xeon W-2400/3400 ===
- Xeon w3-2423
- Xeon w3-2425
- Xeon w3-2435
- Xeon w5-2445
- Xeon w5-2455X
- Xeon w5-2465X
- Xeon w7-2475X
- Xeon w7-2495X
- Xeon w5-3425
- Xeon w5-3435X
- Xeon w7-3445
- Xeon w7-3455
- Xeon w7-3465X
- Xeon w9-3475X
- Xeon w9-3495X

=== Xeon W-2500/3500 ===
- Xeon w3-2525
- Xeon w3-2535
- Xeon w5-2545
- Xeon w5-2555X
- Xeon w5-2565X
- Xeon w7-2575X
- Xeon w7-2595X
- Xeon w5-3525
- Xeon w5-3535X
- Xeon w7-3545
- Xeon w7-3555
- Xeon w7-3565X
- Xeon w9-3575X
- Xeon w9-3595X

== Emerald Rapids-based ==
=== Xeon Bronze ===
- Xeon Bronze 3508U

=== Xeon Silver ===
- Xeon Silver 4509Y
- Xeon Silver 4510
- Xeon Silver 4510T
- Xeon Silver 4514Y
- Xeon Silver 4516+

=== Xeon Gold ===
- Xeon Gold 5512U
- Xeon Gold 5515+
- Xeon Gold 5520+
- Xeon Gold 6526Y
- Xeon Gold 6530
- Xeon Gold 6534
- Xeon Gold 6538N
- Xeon Gold 6538Y+
- Xeon Gold 6542Y
- Xeon Gold 6544Y
- Xeon Gold 6548N
- Xeon Gold 6548Y+
- Xeon Gold 6554S
- Xeon Gold 6558Q

=== Xeon Platinum ===
- Xeon Platinum 8558
- Xeon Platinum 8558P
- Xeon Platinum 8558U
- Xeon Platinum 8562Y+
- Xeon Platinum 8568Y+
- Xeon Platinum 8570
- Xeon Platinum 8571N
- Xeon Platinum 8580
- Xeon Platinum 8581V
- Xeon Platinum 8592+
- Xeon Platinum 8592V
- Xeon Platinum 8593Q

== Sierra Forest-based ==
=== Sierra Forest-SP ===
- Xeon 6710E
- Xeon 6731E
- Xeon 6740E
- Xeon 6746E
- Xeon 6756E
- Xeon 6766E
- Xeon 6780E

== Granite Rapids-based ==
=== Granite Rapids-AP ===
- Xeon 6944P
- Xeon 6952P
- Xeon 6960P
- Xeon 6962P
- Xeon 6966P-C
- Xeon 6972P
- Xeon 6979P
- Xeon 6980P

=== Granite Rapids-SP ===
- Xeon 6505P
- Xeon 6507P
- Xeon 6511P
- Xeon 6515P
- Xeon 6517P
- Xeon 6520P
- Xeon 6521P
- Xeon 6527P
- Xeon 6530P
- Xeon 6714P
- Xeon 6724P
- Xeon 6728P
- Xeon 6730P
- Xeon 6732P
- Xeon 6731P
- Xeon 6736P
- Xeon 6737P
- Xeon 6738P
- Xeon 6740P
- Xeon 6741P
- Xeon 6745P
- Xeon 6747P
- Xeon 6748P
- Xeon 6760P
- Xeon 6761P
- Xeon 6762P
- Xeon 6767P
- Xeon 6768P
- Xeon 6774P
- Xeon 6776P
- Xeon 6781P
- Xeon 6787P
- Xeon 6788P

=== Granite Rapids-D (BGA 4368) ===
- Xeon 6503P-B
- Xeon 6513P-B
- Xeon 6516P-B
- Xeon 6523P-B
- Xeon 6533P-B
- Xeon 6543P-B
- Xeon 6546P-B
- Xeon 6553P-B
- Xeon 6556P-B
- Xeon 6563P-B
- Xeon 6706P-B
- Xeon 6716P-B
- Xeon 6726P-B

=== Granite Rapids-D (BGA 5026) ===
- Xeon 6518P-B
- Xeon 6532P-B
- Xeon 6544P-B
- Xeon 6548P-B
- Xeon 6718P-B
- Xeon 6756P-B
- Xeon 6766P-B
- Xeon 6768P-B
- Xeon 6776P-B

=== Granite Rapids-WS ===
- Xeon 634
- Xeon 636
- Xeon 638
- Xeon 654
- Xeon 656
- Xeon 658X
- Xeon 674X
- Xeon 676X
- Xeon 678X
- Xeon 696X
- Xeon 698X

== Clearwater Forest-based ==
=== Clearwater Forest-AP ===
All models are Xeon 6900E+ series.

- Xeon 6960E+
- Xeon 6970E+
- Xeon 6980E+
- Xeon 6990E+

== See also ==
- List of Intel Xeon chipsets
- List of AMD Opteron processors
- AMD EPYC
- List of Intel microprocessors
