= List of Intel Xeon processors (P6-based) =

== Pentium II Xeon ==
=== "Drake" (250 nm) ===
- Based on P6 microarchitecture
- All models support: MMX
- All models support quad-processor configurations
- Steppings: B0, B1

Model number	Frequency	L2 cache	FSB	Mult.	Voltage	TDP	Socket	Release date	Release price (USD)
Pentium II Xeon 400	400 MHz	512 KB	100 MT/s	4×	2.0 V	30.8 W	Slot 2	June 29, 1998	$1,124
Pentium II Xeon 400	400 MHz	1 MB	100 MT/s	4×	2.0 V	38.1 W	Slot 2	June 29, 1998	$2,836
Pentium II Xeon 450	450 MHz	512 KB	100 MT/s	4.5×	2.0 V	34.5 W	Slot 2	October 6, 1998	$824
Pentium II Xeon 450	450 MHz	1 MB	100 MT/s	4.5×	2.0 V	42.8 W	Slot 2	January 5, 1999	$1,980
Pentium II Xeon 450	450 MHz	2 MB	100 MT/s	4.5×	2.0 V	46.7 W	Slot 2	January 5, 1999	$3,692

== Pentium III Xeon ==
=== "Tanner" (250 nm) ===
- Based on P6 microarchitecture
- All models support: MMX, SSE
- All models support quad-processor configurations
- Die size: 123 mm^{2}
- Steppings: B0, C0

Model number	Frequency	L2 cache	FSB	Mult.	Voltage	TDP	Socket	Release date	Release price (USD)
Pentium III Xeon 500	500 MHz	512 KB	100 MT/s	5×	2.0 V	36 W	Slot 2	March 17, 1999	$931
Pentium III Xeon 500	500 MHz	1 MB	100 MT/s	5×	2.0 V	44 W	Slot 2	March 17, 1999	$1,980
Pentium III Xeon 500	500 MHz	2 MB	100 MT/s	5×	2.0 V	36.2 W	Slot 2	March 17, 1999	$3,692
Pentium III Xeon 550	550 MHz	512 KB	100 MT/s	5.5×	2.0 V	34 W	Slot 2	August 23, 1999	$931
Pentium III Xeon 550	550 MHz	1 MB	100 MT/s	5.5×	2.0 V	34 W	Slot 2	August 23, 1999	$1,980
Pentium III Xeon 550	550 MHz	2 MB	100 MT/s	5.5×	2.0 V	34 W	Slot 2	August 23, 1999	$3,692

=== "Cascades" (180 nm) ===
- Based on P6 microarchitecture
- All models support: MMX, SSE
- Only 700 MHz and 900 MHz models are capable of quad processor configurations
- All models shipped in either 2.8 V or 5/12 V variants
- Steppings: A0, A1, A2, B0, C0

Model number	Frequency	L2 cache	FSB	Mult.	Voltage	TDP	Socket	Release date	Release price (USD)
Pentium III Xeon 600	600 MHz	256 KB	133 MT/s	4.5×	2.8–12 V	19.2 W	Slot 2	October 1999	$505
Pentium III Xeon 667	667 MHz	256 KB	133 MT/s	5×	2.8–12 V	21.3 W	Slot 2	October 25, 1999	$655
Pentium III Xeon 700	700 MHz	1 MB	100 MT/s	7×	2.8–12 V	29.6 W	Slot 2	May 22, 2000	$1,177
Pentium III Xeon 700	700 MHz	2 MB	100 MT/s	7×	2.8–12 V	29.6 W	Slot 2	May 22, 2000	$1,980
Pentium III Xeon 733	733 MHz	256 KB	133 MT/s	5.5×	2.8–12 V	23.3 W	Slot 2	October 25, 1999	$826
Pentium III Xeon 800	800 MHz	256 KB	133 MT/s	6×	2.8–12 V	25.4 W	Slot 2	January 12, 2000	$901
Pentium III Xeon 866	867 MHz	256 KB	133 MT/s	6.5×	2.8–12 V	29.6 W	Slot 2	April 10, 2000	$826
Pentium III Xeon 900	900 MHz	2 MB	100 MT/s	9×	2.8–12 V	39.3 W	Slot 2	March 21, 2001 (Note: Withdrawn in July due to a bug, fixed by late August, shipping again in September.)	$3,692
Pentium III Xeon 933	933 MHz	256 KB	133 MT/s	7×	2.8–12 V	29.6 W	Slot 2	May 24, 2000	$794
Pentium III Xeon 1.00	1000 MHz	256 KB	133 MT/s	7.5×	2.8–12 V	30.8 W	Slot 2	August 22, 2000	$719
