= List of Intel Xeon processors (Sandy Bridge–based) =

== "Gladden" (32 nm) ==
- All models support: MMX, SSE, SSE2, SSE3, SSSE3, SSE4.1, SSE4.2, AVX, Enhanced Intel SpeedStep Technology (EIST), Intel 64, XD bit (an NX bit implementation), TXT, Intel VT-x, Intel EPT, Intel VT-d, Hyper-threading, AES-NI.
- All models support uni-processor configurations only.
- Die size:216 mm^{2}
- Steppings: D2

=== Xeon E3-11xx (uniprocessor) ===
Model number	sSpec number	Cores	Frequency	Turbo	L2 cache	L3 cache	TDP	Socket	I/O bus	Memory	Release date	Part number(s)	Release price (USD)
Xeon E3-1105C	SR0NS (D2)	4	1 GHz	—N/a	4 × 256 KB	6 MB	25 W	BGA 1284	DMI 2.0	2× DDR3-1600	May 2012	AV8062701048800	$333
Xeon E3-1125C	SR0NU (D2)	4	2 GHz	—N/a	4 × 256 KB	8 MB	40 W	BGA 1284	DMI 2.0	2× DDR3-1600	May 2012	AV8062701146600	$444

== "Sandy Bridge" (32 nm) ==
- All models support: MMX, SSE, SSE2, SSE3, SSSE3, SSE4.1, SSE4.2, AVX, Enhanced Intel SpeedStep Technology (EIST), Intel 64, XD bit (an NX bit implementation), TXT, Intel VT-x, Intel EPT, Intel VT-d, Hyper-threading (except E3-1220 and E3-1225), Turbo Boost, AES-NI, Smart Cache.
- All models support uni-processor configurations only.
- Intel HD Graphics P3000 uses drivers that are optimized and certified for professional applications, similar to Nvidia Quadro and AMD FirePro products.
- Die size: D2: 216 mm^{2}, Q0: 131 mm^{2}
- Steppings: D2, Q0
- All models support DDR3-1333

=== Xeon E3-12xx (uniprocessor) ===
Model number	sSpec number	Cores	Frequency	Turbo	L2 cache	L3 cache	GPU model	GPU frequency	TDP	Socket	I/O bus	Release date	Part number(s)	Release price (USD)
Dual Core, low power
Xeon E3-1220L	SR070 (Q0)	2	2.2 GHz	10/12	2 × 256 KB	3 MB	—N/a	—N/a	20 W	LGA 1155	DMI 2.0	April 3, 2011	CM8062307262834; CM8062307262828	$189
Quad Core
Xeon E3-1220	SR00F (D2)	4	3.1 GHz	1/2/2/3	4 × 256 KB	8 MB	—N/a	—N/a	80 W	LGA 1155	DMI 2.0	April 3, 2011	CM8062300921702; BX80623E31220	$189
Xeon E3-1225	SR00G (D2)	4	3.1 GHz	1/2/2/3	4 × 256 KB	6 MB	HD Graphics P3000	850–1350 MHz	95 W	LGA 1155	DMI 2.0	April 3, 2011	CM8062307262304; BX80623E31225	$194
Xeon E3-1230	SR00H (D2)	4	3.2 GHz	1/2/3/4	4 × 256 KB	8 MB	—N/a	—N/a	80 W	LGA 1155	DMI 2.0	April 3, 2011	CM8062307262610; BX80623E31230	$215
Xeon E3-1235	SR00J (D2)	4	3.2 GHz	1/2/3/4	4 × 256 KB	8 MB	HD Graphics P3000	850–1350 MHz	95 W	LGA 1155	DMI 2.0	April 3, 2011	CM8062307262206; BX80623E31235	$240
Xeon E3-1240	SR00K (D2)	4	3.3 GHz	1/2/3/4	4 × 256 KB	8 MB	—N/a	—N/a	80 W	LGA 1155	DMI 2.0	April 3, 2011	CM8062307262503; BX80623E31240	$250
Xeon E3-1245	SR00L (D2)	4	3.3 GHz	1/2/3/4	4 × 256 KB	8 MB	HD Graphics P3000	850–1350 MHz	95 W	LGA 1155	DMI 2.0	April 3, 2011	CM8062307262103; BX80623E31245	$262
Xeon E3-1270	SR00N (D2)	4	3.4 GHz	1/2/3/4	4 × 256 KB	8 MB	—N/a	—N/a	80 W	LGA 1155	DMI 2.0	April 3, 2011	CM8062307262403; BX80623E31270	$328
Xeon E3-1275	SR00P (D2)	4	3.4 GHz	1/2/3/4	4 × 256 KB	8 MB	HD Graphics P3000	850–1350 MHz	95 W	LGA 1155	DMI 2.0	April 3, 2011	CM8062307262003; BX80623E31275	$339
Xeon E3-1280	SR00R (D2)	4	3.5 GHz	1/2/3/4	4 × 256 KB	8 MB	—N/a	—N/a	95 W	LGA 1155	DMI 2.0	April 3, 2011	CM8062307261903; BX80623E31280	$612
Xeon E3-1290	SR055 (D2)	4	3.6 GHz	1/2/3/4	4 × 256 KB	8 MB	—N/a	—N/a	95 W	LGA 1155	DMI 2.0	May 29, 2011	CM8062307261903	$885
Quad Core, low power
Xeon E3-1260L	SR00M (D2)	4	2.4 GHz	1/4/8/9	4 × 256 KB	8 MB	HD Graphics 2000	650–1250 MHz	45 W	LGA 1155	DMI 2.0	April 3, 2011	CM8062301061800	$294
Xeon E3-1265L	SR0G0 (D2)	4	2.4 GHz	1/4/8/9	4 × 256 KB	8 MB	HD Graphics P3000	650–1250 MHz	45 W	LGA 1155	DMI 2.0	April 3, 2011	CM8062301149700	OEM

== "Sandy Bridge-EN" (32 nm) Entry ==
- Based on Sandy Bridge-E CPU.
- All models support: MMX, SSE, SSE2, SSE3, SSSE3, SSE4.1, SSE4.2, AVX, Enhanced Intel SpeedStep Technology (EIST), Intel 64, XD bit (an NX bit implementation), TXT, Intel VT-x, Intel EPT, Intel VT-d, Intel VT-c, Intel x8 SDDC, Hyper-threading (except E5-2403 and E5-2407), Turbo Boost (except E5-1428L, E5-2403 and E5-2407), AES-NI, Smart Cache.

=== Xeon E5-14xx (uniprocessor) ===
Model number	sSpec number	Cores	Frequency	Turbo	L2 cache	L3 cache	TDP	Socket	I/O bus	Memory	Release date	Part number(s)	Release price (USD)
Quad Core
Xeon E5-1410	SR0RM (M1)	4	2.8 GHz	3/4/4/4	4 × 256 KB	10 MB	80 W	LGA 1356	DMI 2.0	3× DDR3-1333	May 14, 2012	CM8062001257301	OEM
Six Core
Xeon E5-1428L	SR0JW (C2); SR0M4 (C2)	6	1.8 GHz	—N/a	6 × 256 KB	15 MB	60 W	LGA 1356	DMI 2.0	3× DDR3-1333	Q2 2012	CM8062001144000	$395

=== Xeon E5-24xx (dual-processor) ===
Model number	sSpec number	Cores	Frequency	Turbo	L2 cache	L3 cache	TDP	Socket	I/O bus	Memory	Release date	Part number(s)	Release price (USD)
Quad Core
Xeon E5-2403	SR0LS (M1)	4	1.8 GHz	—N/a	4 × 256 KB	10 MB	80 W	LGA 1356	6.4 GT/s QPI	3× DDR3-1066	May 14, 2012	CM8062001048300; BX80621E52403	$188 $195
Xeon E5-2407	SR0LR (M1)	4	2.2 GHz	—N/a	4 × 256 KB	10 MB	80 W	LGA 1356	6.4 GT/s QPI	3× DDR3-1066	May 14, 2012	CM8062001048200; BX80621E52407	$250 $251
Quad Core, low power
Xeon E5-2418L	SR0M5 (M1)	4	2 GHz	0/0/1/1	4 × 256 KB	10 MB	50 W	LGA 1356	6.4 GT/s QPI	3× DDR3-1333	May 14, 2012	CM8062000911406	$387
Six Core
Xeon E5-2420	SR0LN (C2)	6	1.9 GHz	3/3/4/4/5/5	6 × 256 KB	15 MB	95 W	LGA 1356	7.2 GT/s QPI	3× DDR3-1333	May 14, 2012	CM8062001183000; BX80621E52420	$387 $391
Xeon E5-2430	SR0LM (C2)	6	2.2 GHz	3/3/4/4/5/5	6 × 256 KB	15 MB	95 W	LGA 1356	7.2 GT/s QPI	3× DDR3-1333	May 14, 2012	CM8062001122601; BX80621E52430	$551 $554
Xeon E5-2440	SR0LK (C2)	6	2.4 GHz	3/3/4/4/5/5	6 × 256 KB	15 MB	95 W	LGA 1356	7.2 GT/s QPI	3× DDR3-1333	May 14, 2012	CM8062000862604; BX80621E52440	$832 $837
Six Core, low power
Xeon E5-2428L	SR0JV (C2); SR0M3 (C2)	6	1.8 GHz	0/0/1/1/2/2	6 × 256 KB	15 MB	60 W	LGA 1356	7.2 GT/s QPI	3× DDR3-1333	May 14, 2012	CM8062007187509	$628
Xeon E5-2430L	SR0LL (C2)	6	2 GHz	3/3/4/4/5/5	6 × 256 KB	15 MB	60 W	LGA 1356	7.2 GT/s QPI	3× DDR3-1333	May 14, 2012	CM8062000862912	$662
Eight Core
Xeon E5-2450	SR0LJ (C2)	8	2.1 GHz	5/5/6/6/7/7/8/8	8 × 256 KB	20 MB	95 W	LGA 1356	8.0 GT/s QPI	3× DDR3-1600	May 14, 2012	CM8062000862501; BX80621E52450	$1107 $1112
Xeon E5-2470	SR0LG (C2)	8	2.3 GHz	5/5/6/6/7/7/8/8	8 × 256 KB	20 MB	95 W	LGA 1356	8.0 GT/s QPI	3× DDR3-1600	May 14, 2012	CM8062007187242; BX80621E52470	$1440 $1444
Eight Core, low power
Xeon E5-2448L	SR0JU (C2); SR0M2 (C2)	8	1.8 GHz	0/0/1/1/2/2/3/3	8 × 256 KB	20 MB	70 W	LGA 1356	8.0 GT/s QPI	3× DDR3-1600	May 14, 2012	CM8062007187409	$1151
Xeon E5-2449L	SR0R1 (C2)	8	1.4 GHz	1.8 GHz	8 × 256 KB	20 MB	50 W	LGA 1356	8.0 GT/s QPI	3× DDR3-1600	May 14, 2012	CM8062001239600	OEM
Xeon E5-2450L	SR0LH (C2)	8	1.8 GHz	2/2/3/3/4/4/5/5	8 × 256 KB	20 MB	70 W	LGA 1356	8.0 GT/s QPI	3× DDR3-1600	May 14, 2012	CM8062007283711	$1106

== "Sandy Bridge-EP" (32 nm) Efficient Performance ==
- Based on Sandy Bridge microarchitecture.
- All models support: MMX, SSE, SSE2, SSE3, SSSE3, SSE4.1, SSE4.2, AVX, Enhanced Intel SpeedStep Technology (EIST), Intel 64, XD bit (an NX bit implementation), TXT, Intel VT-x, Intel EPT, Intel VT-d, Intel VT-c, Intel x8 SDDC, Hyper-threading (except E5-1603, E5-1607, E5-2603, E5-2609 and E5-4617), Turbo Boost (except E5-1603, E5-1607, E5-2603, E5-2609, E5-4603 and E5-4607), AES-NI, Smart Cache.

=== Xeon E5-16xx (uniprocessor) ===
Model number	sSpec number	Cores	Frequency	Turbo	L2 cache	L3 cache	TDP	Socket	I/O bus	Memory	Release date	Part number(s)	Release price (USD)
standard power
Xeon E5-1603	SR0L9 (M1)	4	2.8 GHz	—N/a	4 × 256 KB	10 MB	130 W	LGA 2011	DMI 2.0	4× DDR3-1066	March 6, 2012	CM8062107186502	$198
Xeon E5-1607	SR0L8 (M1)	4	3 GHz	—N/a	4 × 256 KB	10 MB	130 W	LGA 2011	DMI 2.0	4× DDR3-1066	March 6, 2012	CM8062107186102	$244
Xeon E5-1620	SR0LC (M1)	4	3.6 GHz	1/1/2/2	4 × 256 KB	10 MB	130 W	LGA 2011	DMI 2.0	4× DDR3-1600	March 6, 2012	CM8062101038606	$294
Xeon E5-1650	SR0HC (C1); SR0KZ (C2)	6	3.2 GHz	3/3/4/5/6/6	6 × 256 KB	12 MB	130 W	LGA 2011	DMI 2.0	4× DDR3-1600	March 6, 2012	CM8062101102002	$583
Xeon E5-1660	SR0H2 (C1); SR0KN (C2)	6	3.3 GHz	3/3/4/4/6/6	6 × 256 KB	15 MB	130 W	LGA 2011	DMI 2.0	4× DDR3-1600	March 6, 2012	CM8062107284111; BX80621E51660	$1080 $1083

=== Xeon E5-26xx (dual-processor) ===
Model number	sSpec number	Cores	Frequency	Turbo	L2 cache	L3 cache	TDP	Socket	I/O bus	Memory	Release date	Part number(s)	Release price (USD)
Dual Core
Xeon E5-2637	SR0LE (M1)	2	3 GHz	5/5	2 × 256 KB	5 MB	80 W	LGA 2011	2× 8.0 GT/s QPI	4× DDR3-1600	March 6, 2012	CM8062101143202	$885
Quad Core
Xeon E5-2603	SR0LB (M1)	4	1.8 GHz	—N/a	4 × 256 KB	10 MB	80 W	LGA 2011	2× 6.4 GT/s QPI	4× DDR3-1066	March 6, 2012	CM8062100856501; BX80621E52603	$198 $207
Xeon E5-2609	SR0LA (M1)	4	2.4 GHz	—N/a	4 × 256 KB	10 MB	80 W	LGA 2011	2× 6.4 GT/s QPI	4× DDR3-1066	March 6, 2012	CM8062107186604; BX80621E52609	$294 $299
Xeon E5-2643	SR0L7 (M1)	4	3.3 GHz	1/1/2/2	4 × 256 KB	10 MB	130 W	LGA 2011	2× 8.0 GT/s QPI	4× DDR3-1600	March 6, 2012	CM8062107185605	$885
Quad Core, low power
Xeon E5-2618L	SR0M1 (M1)	4	1.8 GHz	—N/a	4 × 256 KB	10 MB	40 W	LGA 2011	2× 6.4 GT/s QPI	4× DDR3-1333	July 22, 2013	CM8062101187102	OEM
Six core
Xeon E5-2620	SR0KW (C2); SR0H7 (C1)	6	2 GHz	3/3/4/4/5/5	6 × 256 KB	15 MB	95 W	LGA 2011	2× 7.2 GT/s QPI	4× DDR3-1333	March 6, 2012	CM8062101048401; BX80621E52620	$406 $410
Xeon E5-2630	SR0KV (C2); SR0H6 (C1)	6	2.3 GHz	3/3/4/4/5/5	6 × 256 KB	15 MB	95 W	LGA 2011	2× 7.2 GT/s QPI	4× DDR3-1333	March 6, 2012	CM8062101038801; BX80621E52630	$612 $616
Xeon E5-2640	SR0KR (C2); SR0H5 (C1)	6	2.5 GHz	3/3/4/4/5/5	6 × 256 KB	15 MB	95 W	LGA 2011	2× 7.2 GT/s QPI	4× DDR3-1333	March 6, 2012	CM8062100856401; BX80621E52640	$885 $889
Xeon E5-2667	SR0KP (C2); SR0H3 (C1)	6	2.9 GHz	3/3/3/4/5/6	6 × 256 KB	15 MB	130 W	LGA 2011	2× 8.0 GT/s QPI	4× DDR3-1600	March 6, 2012	CM8062100854802	$1552
Six Core, low power
Xeon E5-2628L	SR0LY (C2)	6	1.8 GHz	—N/a	6 × 256 KB	15 MB	60 W	LGA 2011	2× 7.2 GT/s QPI	4× DDR3-1333	July 22, 2013	CM8062100911304	OEM
Xeon E5-2630L	SR0KM (C2); SR0H1 (C1)	6	2 GHz	3/3/4/4/5/5	6 × 256 KB	15 MB	60 W	LGA 2011	2× 7.2 GT/s QPI	4× DDR3-1333	March 6, 2012	CM8062107185405	$662
Eight Core
Xeon E5-2650	SR0KQ (C2); SR0H4 (C1)	8	2 GHz	4/4/5/5/5/7/8/8	8 × 256 KB	20 MB	95 W	LGA 2011	2× 8.0 GT/s QPI	4× DDR3-1600	March 6, 2012	CM8062100856218; BX80621E52650	$1107 $1112
Xeon E5-2658	SR0LZ (C2); SR0HG (C1)	8	2.1 GHz	0/0/1/1/2/2/3/3	8 × 256 KB	20 MB	95 W	LGA 2011	2× 8.0 GT/s QPI	4× DDR3-1600	March 6, 2012	CM8062101042805	$1186
Xeon E5-2660	SR0KK (C2); SR0GZ (C1)	8	2.2 GHz	5/5/6/6/7/7/8/8	8 × 256 KB	20 MB	95 W	LGA 2011	2× 8.0 GT/s QPI	4× DDR3-1600	March 6, 2012	CM8062107184801; BX80621E52660	$1329 $1333
Xeon E5-2665	SR0L1 (C2); SR0HB (C1)	8	2.4 GHz	4/4/5/5/6/6/7/7	8 × 256 KB	20 MB	115 W	LGA 2011	2× 8.0 GT/s QPI	4× DDR3-1600	March 6, 2012	CM8062101143101; BX80621E52665	$1440 $1444
Xeon E5-2670	SR0KX (C2); SR0H8 (C1)	8	2.6 GHz	4/4/5/5/6/6/7/7	8 × 256 KB	20 MB	115 W	LGA 2011	2× 8.0 GT/s QPI	4× DDR3-1600	March 6, 2012	CM8062101082713; BX80621E52670	$1552 $1556
Xeon E5-2689	SR0L6 (C2); SR0HD (C1)	8	2.6 GHz	7/7/7/7/8/8/10/10	8 × 256 KB	20 MB	115 W	LGA 2011	2× 8.0 GT/s QPI	4× DDR3-1600	March 6, 2012	CM8062101163000	OEM
Xeon E5-2680	SR0KH (C2); SR0GY (C1)	8	2.7 GHz	4/4/5/5/5/7/8/8	8 × 256 KB	20 MB	130 W	LGA 2011	2× 8.0 GT/s QPI	4× DDR3-1600	March 6, 2012	CM8062107184424; BX80621E52680	$1723 $1727
Xeon E5-2690	SR0L0 (C2); SR0HA (C1)	8	2.9 GHz	4/4/4/5/5/7/7/9	8 × 256 KB	20 MB	135 W	LGA 2011	2× 8.0 GT/s QPI	4× DDR3-1600	March 6, 2012	CM8062101122501; BX80621E52690	$2057 $2061
Xeon E5-2687W	SR0KG (C2); SR0GX (C1)	8	3.1 GHz	3/3/3/4/4/5/5/7	8 × 256 KB	20 MB	150 W	LGA 2011	2× 8.0 GT/s QPI	4× DDR3-1600	March 6, 2012	CM8062107184308; BX80621E52687W	$1885 $1890
Eight Core, low power
Xeon E5-2648L	SR0LX (C2); SR0HE (C1)	8	1.8 GHz	0/0/1/1/2/2/3/3	8 × 256 KB	20 MB	70 W	LGA 2011	2× 8.0 GT/s QPI	4× DDR3-1600	March 6, 2012	CM8062100854905	$1186
Xeon E5-2650L	SR0KL (C2); SR0H0 (C1)	8	1.8 GHz	2/2/3/3/4/4/5/5	8 × 256 KB	20 MB	70 W	LGA 2011	2× 8.0 GT/s QPI	4× DDR3-1600	March 6, 2012	CM8062107185309	$1107

=== Xeon E5-46xx (quad-processor) ===
Model number	sSpec number	Cores	Frequency	Turbo	L2 cache	L3 cache	TDP	Socket	I/O bus	Memory	Release date	Part number(s)	Release price (USD)
Quad Core
Xeon E5-4603	SR0LF (M1)	4	2 GHz	—N/a	4 × 256 KB	10 MB	95 W	LGA 2011	2× 6.4 GT/s QPI	4× DDR3-1066	May 14, 2012	CM8062101190400; BX80621E54603	$551 $555
Six Core
Xeon E5-4607	SR0JL (Unknown); SR0KU (C2)	6	2.2 GHz	—N/a	6 × 256 KB	12 MB	95 W	LGA 2011	2× 6.4 GT/s QPI	4× DDR3-1066	May 14, 2012	CM8062101038501; BX80621E54607	$885 $889
Xeon E5-4610	SR0JJ (Unknown); SR0KS (C2)	6	2.4 GHz	3/3/4/4/5/5	6 × 256 KB	15 MB	95 W	LGA 2011	2× 7.2 GT/s QPI	4× DDR3-1333	May 14, 2012	CM8062100862401; BX80621E54610	$1219 $1223
Xeon E5-4617	SR0JQ (Unknown); SR0L5 (C2)	6	2.9 GHz	3/3/4/4/5/5	6 × 256 KB	15 MB	130 W	LGA 2011	2× 7.2 GT/s QPI	4× DDR3-1600	May 14, 2012	CM8062101145700	$1611
Eight Core
Xeon E5-4620	SR0JP (Unknown); SR0L4 (C2)	8	2.2 GHz	1/1/2/2/3/3/4/4	8 × 256 KB	16 MB	95 W	LGA 2011	2× 7.2 GT/s QPI	4× DDR3-1333	May 14, 2012	CM8062101145500; BX80621E54620	$1611 $1616
Xeon E5-4640	SR0JK (Unknown); SR0KT (Unknown); SR0QT (C2)	8	2.4 GHz	1/1/2/2/3/3/4/4	8 × 256 KB	20 MB	95 W	LGA 2011	2× 8.0 GT/s QPI	4× DDR3-1600	May 14, 2012	CM8062101038303; BX80621E54640; CM8062101229400	$2725 $2730 $2725
Xeon E5-4650	SR0JH (Unknown); SR0KJ (Unknown); SR0QR (C2)	8	2.7 GHz	2/2/3/3/3/5/6/6	8 × 256 KB	20 MB	130 W	LGA 2011	2× 8.0 GT/s QPI	4× DDR3-1600	May 14, 2012	CM8062107184516; BX80621E54650; CM8062101229200	$3616 $3620 $3616
Eight Core, low power
Xeon E5-4650L	SR0JN (Unknown); SR0L3 (Unknown); SR0QS (C2)	8	2.6 GHz	2/2/3/3/4/4/5/5	8 × 256 KB	20 MB	115 W	LGA 2011	2× 8.0 GT/s QPI	4× DDR3-1600	May 14, 2012	CM8062101144700; BX80621E54650L; CM8062101229300	$3616 $3620 $3616
