= List of Intel Xeon processors (Comet Lake-based) =

== "Comet Lake-S" (14 nm) ==
Common features:

- All processors support up to 128 GB of DDR4-2933.

=== Xeon W-12xx (uniprocessor) ===
- -E: embedded
- -P: high performance (and power), with cTDP down to 95 W
- -T: low power

Model number	sSpec number	Cores (threads)	Frequency	Turbo	L2 cache	L3 cache	GPU model	GPU frequency	TDP	Socket	I/O bus	Release date	Part number(s)	Release price (USD)
Standard power
Xeon W-1250	SRH48 (G1)	6 (12)	3.3 GHz	4.7 GHz	6 × 256 KB	12 MB	HD Graphics P630	350-1200 MHz	80 W	LGA 1200	DMI 3.0	May 2020	CM8070104379507; BX80701W1250	$255
Xeon W-1270	SRH96 (Q0)	8 (16)	3.4 GHz	5.0 GHz	8 × 256 KB	16 MB	HD Graphics P630	350-1200 MHz	80 W	LGA 1200	DMI 3.0	May 2020	CM8070104380910; BX80701W1270	$362
Xeon W-1290	SRH94 (Q0)	10 (20)	3.2 GHz	5.1 GHz (5.2 w/ TVB)	10 × 256 KB	20 MB	HD Graphics P630	350-1200 MHz	80 W	LGA 1200	DMI 3.0	May 2020	CM8070104379111; BX80701W1290	$494
Standard power, embedded
Xeon W-1250E	SRH6L (G1)	6 (12)	3.5 GHz	4.7 GHz	6 × 256 KB	12 MB	HD Graphics 630	350-1200 MHz	80 W	LGA 1200	DMI 3.0	May 2020	CM8070104425005	$260
Xeon W-1270E	SRJGE (Q0)	8 (16)	3.4 GHz	4.8 GHz	8 × 256 KB	16 MB	HD Graphics 630	350-1200 MHz	80 W	LGA 1200	DMI 3.0	May 2020	CM8070104420607	$367
Xeon W-1290E	SRJFB (Q0)	10 (20)	3.5 GHz	4.8 GHz	10 × 256 KB	20 MB	HD Graphics 630	350-1200 MHz	95 W	LGA 1200	DMI 3.0	May 2020	CM8070104420510	$500
High power
Xeon W-1250P	SRH7H (Q0)	6 (12)	4.1 GHz	4.8 GHz	6 × 256 KB	12 MB	HD Graphics P630	350-1200 MHz	125 W	LGA 1200	DMI 3.0	May 2020	CM8070104381006; BX80701W1250P	$311
Xeon W-1270P	SRH95 (Q0)	8 (16)	3.8 GHz	5.1 GHz	8 × 256 KB	16 MB	HD Graphics P630	350-1200 MHz	125 W	LGA 1200	DMI 3.0	May 2020	CM8070104380809; BX80701W1270P	$428
Xeon W-1290P	SRH93 (Q0)	10 (20)	3.7 GHz	5.2 GHz (5.3 w/ TVB)	10 × 256 KB	20 MB	HD Graphics P630	350-1200 MHz	125 W	LGA 1200	DMI 3.0	May 2020	CM8070104378412	$539
Low power
Xeon W-1290T	SRH97 (Q0)	10 (20)	1.9 GHz	4.7 GHz	10 × 256 KB	20 MB	HD Graphics P630	350-1200 MHz	35 W	LGA 1200	DMI 3.0	May 2020	CM8070104429007	$494
Low power, embedded
Xeon W-1250TE	SRH6M (G1)	6 (12)	2.4 GHz	3.8 GHz	6 × 256 KB	12 MB	HD Graphics 630	350-1150 MHz	35 W	LGA 1200	DMI 3.0	May 2020	CM8070104440305	$260
Xeon W-1270TE	SRJGF (Q0)	8 (16)	2 GHz	4.4 GHz	8 × 256 KB	16 MB	HD Graphics 630	350-1150 MHz	35 W	LGA 1200	DMI 3.0	May 2020	CM8070104420706	$367
Xeon W-1290TE	SRJFH (Q0)	10 (20)	1.8 GHz	4.5 GHz	10 × 256 KB	20 MB	HD Graphics 630	350-1200 MHz	35 W	LGA 1200	DMI 3.0	May 2020	CM8070104440205	$500

== "Comet Lake-H" (14 nm) ==
=== Xeon W-10xxxM (uniprocessor) ===
Model number	sSpec number	Cores (threads)	Frequency	Turbo	L2 cache	L3 cache	GPU model	GPU frequency	TDP	Socket	I/O bus	Release date	Part number(s)	Release price (USD)
Standard power, mobile
Xeon W-10855M	SRH8M (R1)	6 (12)	2.8 GHz	4.9 GHz (5.1 w/ TVB)	6 × 256 KB	12 MB	UHD Graphics 630	350–1200 MHz	45 W	BGA 1440	DMI 3.0	May 2020	CL8070104398912	$450
Xeon W-10885M	SRH8L (R1)	8 (16)	2.4 GHz	5.1 GHz (5.3 w/ TVB)	8 × 256 KB	16 MB	UHD Graphics 630	350–1250 MHz	45 W	BGA 1440	DMI 3.0	May 2020	CL8070104398811	$623
