= List of Intel Xeon processors (Kaby Lake-based) =

== "Kaby Lake-S" (14 nm) Entry-level server/workstation ==
- All models support: MMX, SSE, SSE2, SSE3, SSSE3, SSE4.1, SSE4.2, AVX, AVX2, FMA3, F16C, BMI1 (Bit Manipulation Instructions1), BMI2, MPX, SGX, Enhanced Intel SpeedStep Technology (EIST), Intel 64, XD bit (an NX bit implementation), TXT, Intel vPro, Intel VT-x, Intel VT-d, Hyper-threading (except E3-1220 v6, E3-1225 v6), Turbo Boost 2.0, AES-NI, Smart Cache, TSX-NI, ECC memory'
- All models support up to 64 GB of DDR4-2400 ECC memory.

=== Xeon E3-12xx v6 (uniprocessor) ===
| Model number | sSpec number | Cores (threads) | Frequency | Turbo | L2 cache | L3 cache | GPU model | GPU frequency | TDP | Socket | I/O bus | Release date | Part number(s) | Release price (USD) |
|---|---|---|---|---|---|---|---|---|---|---|---|---|---|---|
Quad Core
| Xeon E3-1205 v6 | SR32D (B0) | 4 (4) | 3 GHz | —N/a | 4 × 256 KB | 8 MB | HD Graphics P630 | 350–1000 MHz | 65 W | LGA 1151 | DMI 3.0 | March 2017 | CM8067702871025 | $193 |
| Xeon E3-1220 v6 | SR329 (B0) | 4 (4) | 3 GHz | 3.5 GHz | 4 × 256 KB | 8 MB | —N/a | —N/a | 72 W | LGA 1151 | DMI 3.0 | March 2017 | BX80677E31220V6; CM8067702870812 | $193 |
| Xeon E3-1225 v6 | SR32C (B0) | 4 (4) | 3.3 GHz | 3.7 GHz | 4 × 256 KB | 8 MB | HD Graphics P630 | 350–1150 MHz | 73 W | LGA 1151 | DMI 3.0 | March 2017 | BX80677E31225V6; CM8067702871024 | $213 |
| Xeon E3-1230 v6 | SR328 (B0) | 4 (8) | 3.5 GHz | 3.9 GHz | 4 × 256 KB | 8 MB | —N/a | —N/a | 72 W | LGA 1151 | DMI 3.0 | March 2017 | BX80677E31230V6; CM8067702870650 | $250 |
| Xeon E3-1240 v6 | SR327 (B0) | 4 (8) | 3.7 GHz | 4.1 GHz | 4 × 256 KB | 8 MB | —N/a | —N/a | 72 W | LGA 1151 | DMI 3.0 | March 2017 | BX80677E31240V6; CM8067702870649 | $272 |
| Xeon E3-1245 v6 | SR32B (B0) | 4 (8) | 3.7 GHz | 4.1 GHz | 4 × 256 KB | 8 MB | HD Graphics P630 | 350–1150 MHz | 73 W | LGA 1151 | DMI 3.0 | March 2017 | BX80677E31245V6; CM8067702870932 | $284 |
| Xeon E3-1270 v6 | SR326 (B0) | 4 (8) | 3.8 GHz | 4.2 GHz | 4 × 256 KB | 8 MB | —N/a | —N/a | 72 W | LGA 1151 | DMI 3.0 | March 2017 | BX80677E31270V6; CM8067702870648 | $328 |
| Xeon E3-1275 v6 | SR32A (B0) | 4 (8) | 3.8 GHz | 4.2 GHz | 4 × 256 KB | 8 MB | HD Graphics P630 | 350–1150 MHz | 73 W | LGA 1151 | DMI 3.0 | March 2017 | BX80677E31275V6; CM8067702870931 | $339 |
| Xeon E3-1280 v6 | SR325 (B0) | 4 (8) | 3.9 GHz | 4.2 GHz | 4 × 256 KB | 8 MB | —N/a | —N/a | 72 W | LGA 1151 | DMI 3.0 | March 2017 | CM8067702870647 | $383 |
| Xeon E3-1285 v6 | SR373 (B0) | 4 (8) | 4.1 GHz | 4.5 GHz | 4 × 256 KB | 8 MB | HD Graphics P630 | 350–1150 MHz | 79 W | LGA 1151 | DMI 3.0 | August 2017 | CM8067702870937 | $450 |

== "Kaby Lake-H" (14 nm) Mobile Workstation ==
=== Xeon E3-15xx v6 (uniprocessor) ===
| Model number | sSpec number | Cores (threads) | Frequency | Turbo | L2 cache | L3 cache | GPU model | GPU frequency | TDP | Socket | I/O bus | Release date | Part number(s) | Release price (USD) |
|---|---|---|---|---|---|---|---|---|---|---|---|---|---|---|
Quad Core, mobile
| Xeon E3-1505M v6 | SR32K (B0) | 4 (8) | 3 GHz | 6/7/8/10 | 4 × 256 KB | 8 MB | HD Graphics P630 | 350–1100 MHz | 45 W | BGA 1440 | DMI 3.0 | January 2017 | CL8067702869709 | $434 |
| Xeon E3-1535M v6 | SR32H (B0) | 4 (8) | 3.1 GHz | 8/9/10/11 | 4 × 256 KB | 8 MB | HD Graphics P630 | 350–1100 MHz | 45 W | BGA 1440 | DMI 3.0 | January 2017 | CL8067702869614 | $623 |
Quad Core, embedded
| Xeon E3-1501M v6 | SR3F0 (B0) | 4 (4) | 2.9 GHz | 3.6 GHz | 4 × 256 KB | 6 MB | HD Graphics P630 | 350–1000 MHz | 45 W | BGA 1440 | DMI 3.0 | June 2017 | CL8067703401003 | $306 |
Quad Core, low power, embedded
| Xeon E3-1501L v6 | SR3EZ (B0) | 4 (4) | 2.1 GHz | 2.9 GHz | 4 × 256 KB | 6 MB | HD Graphics P630 | 350–1000 MHz | 25 W | BGA 1440 | DMI 3.0 | June 2017 | CL8067703400904 | $306 |
| Xeon E3-1505L v6 | SR34X (B0) | 4 (8) | 2.2 GHz | 3.0 GHz | 4 × 256 KB | 8 MB | HD Graphics P630 | 350–1000 MHz | 25 W | BGA 1440 | DMI 3.0 | January 2017 | CL8067703022209 | $433 |
