= List of Intel Xeon processors (Ice Lake-based) =

== "Ice Lake-SP" (10 nm) Scalable Performance ==
- Support for up to 16 DIMMs of DDR4 memory per CPU socket, maximum 4 TB.
- Supports up to two sockets
- PCI Express 4.0 lanes: 64
- -M: Media processing specialized
- -N: Network & NFV specialized
- -P: IaaS cloud specialized
- -Q: Liquid cooled
- -S: 512 GB SGX enclave per CPU
- -T: High thermal-case and extended reliability
- -U: Uniprocessor
- -V: SaaS cloud specialized
- -Y: Supports Intel SST-PP 2.0

=== Xeon Gold (uniprocessor) ===
Model number	sSpec number	Cores (threads)	Frequency	Turbo Boost all-core/2.0 (/max. 3.0)	L2 cache	L3 cache	TDP	Socket	I/O bus	Memory	Release date	Part number(s)	Release price (USD)
Xeon Gold 6312U	SRKXC (M1)	24 (48)	2.4 GHz	3.1/3.6 GHz	24 × 1.25 MB	36 MB	185 W	LGA 4189	DMI 3.0	8× DDR4-3200	6 April 2021	CD8068904658902	$1450
Xeon Gold 6314U	SRKHL (D2)	32 (64)	2.3 GHz	2.9/3.4 GHz	32 × 1.25 MB	48 MB	205 W	LGA 4189	DMI 3.0	8× DDR4-3200	6 April 2021	CD8068904570101	$2600

=== Xeon Silver (dual processor) ===
Model number	sSpec number	Cores (threads)	Frequency	Turbo Boost all-core/2.0 (/max. 3.0)	L2 cache	L3 cache	TDP	Socket	I/O bus	Memory	Release date	Part number(s)	Release price (USD)
Xeon Silver 4309Y	SRKXS (M1)	8 (16)	2.8 GHz	3.4/3.6 GHz	8 × 1.25 MB	12 MB	105 W	LGA 4189	2× 10.4 GT/s UPI	8× DDR4-2666	6 April 2021	CD8068904658102; BX806894309Y	$501
Xeon Silver 4310T	SRKXP (M1)	10 (20)	2.3 GHz	2.9/3.4 GHz	10 × 1.25 MB	15 MB	105 W	LGA 4189	2× 10.4 GT/s UPI	8× DDR4-2666	6 April 2021	CD8068904659001	$555
Xeon Silver 4310	SRKXN (M1)	12 (24)	2.1 GHz	2.7/3.3 GHz	12 × 1.25 MB	18 MB	120 W	LGA 4189	2× 10.4 GT/s UPI	8× DDR4-2666	6 April 2021	CD8068904657901; BX806894310	$501
Xeon Silver 4314	SRKXL (M1)	16 (32)	2.4 GHz	2.9/3.4 GHz	16 × 1.25 MB	24 MB	135 W	LGA 4189	2× 10.4 GT/s UPI	8× DDR4-2666	6 April 2021	CD8068904655303; BX806894314	$694
Xeon Silver 4316	SRKXH (M1)	20 (40)	2.3 GHz	2.8/3.4 GHz	20 × 1.25 MB	30 MB	150 W	LGA 4189	2× 10.4 GT/s UPI	8× DDR4-2666	6 April 2021	CD8068904656601; BX806894316	$1002

=== Xeon Gold (dual processor) ===
Model number	sSpec number	Cores (threads)	Frequency	Turbo Boost all-core/2.0 (/max. 3.0)	L2 cache	L3 cache	TDP	Socket	I/O bus	Memory	Release date	Part number(s)	Release price (USD)
Xeon Gold 5315Y	SRKXR (M1)	8 (16)	3.2 GHz	3.5/3.6 GHz	8 × 1.25 MB	12 MB	140 W	LGA 4189	3× 11.2 GT/s UPI	8× DDR4-2933	6 April 2021	CD8068904665802	$895
Xeon Gold 5317	SRKXM (M1)	12 (24)	3 GHz	3.4/3.6 GHz	12 × 1.25 MB	18 MB	150 W	LGA 4189	3× 11.2 GT/s UPI	8× DDR4-2933	6 April 2021	CD8068904657302	$950
Xeon Gold 5318N	SRKXG (M1)	24 (48)	2.1 GHz	2.7/3.4 GHz	24 × 1.25 MB	36 MB	150 W	LGA 4189	3× 11.2 GT/s UPI	8× DDR4-2666	6 April 2021	CD8068904658802	$1375
Xeon Gold 5318S	SRKXD (M1)	24 (48)	2.1 GHz	2.6/3.4 GHz	24 × 1.25 MB	36 MB	165 W	LGA 4189	3× 11.2 GT/s UPI	8× DDR4-2933	6 April 2021	CD8068904658602	$1667
Xeon Gold 5318Y	SRKXE (M1)	24 (48)	2.1 GHz	2.6/3.4 GHz	24 × 1.25 MB	36 MB	165 W	LGA 4189	3× 11.2 GT/s UPI	8× DDR4-2933	6 April 2021	CD8068904656703	$1273
Xeon Gold 5320T	SRKXJ (M1)	20 (40)	2.3 GHz	2.9/3.5 GHz	20 × 1.25 MB	30 MB	150 W	LGA 4189	3× 11.2 GT/s UPI	8× DDR4-2933	6 April 2021	CD8068904659101	$1727
Xeon Gold 5320	SRKWU (M1)	26 (52)	2.2 GHz	2.8/3.4 GHz	26 × 1.25 MB	39 MB	185 W	LGA 4189	3× 11.2 GT/s UPI	8× DDR4-2933	6 April 2021	CD8068904659201; BX806895320	$1555
Xeon Gold 6326	SRKXK (M1)	16 (32)	2.9 GHz	3.3/3.5 GHz	16 × 1.25 MB	24 MB	185 W	LGA 4189	3× 11.2 GT/s UPI	8× DDR4-3200	6 April 2021	CD8068904657502	$1300
Xeon Gold 6330	SRKHM (D2)	28 (56)	2 GHz	2.6/3.1 GHz	28 × 1.25 MB	42 MB	205 W	LGA 4189	3× 11.2 GT/s UPI	8× DDR4-2933	6 April 2021	CD8068904572101; BX806896330	$1894
Xeon Gold 6330N	SRKH9 (D2)	28 (56)	2.2 GHz	2.6/3.4 GHz	28 × 1.25 MB	42 MB	165 W	LGA 4189	3× 11.2 GT/s UPI	8× DDR4-2666	6 April 2021	CD8068904582501	$2029
Xeon Gold 6334	SRKXQ (M1)	8 (16)	3.6 GHz	3.6/3.7 GHz	8 × 1.25 MB	18 MB	165 W	LGA 4189	3× 11.2 GT/s UPI	8× DDR4-3200	6 April 2021	CD8068904657601	$2214
Xeon Gold 6336Y	SRKXB (M1)	24 (48)	2.4 GHz	3.0/3.6 GHz	24 × 1.25 MB	36 MB	185 W	LGA 4189	3× 11.2 GT/s UPI	8× DDR4-3200	6 April 2021	CD8068904658702; BX806896336Y	$1977
Xeon Gold 6338T	SRKXF (M1)	24 (48)	2.1 GHz	2.7/3.4 GHz	24 × 1.25 MB	36 MB	165 W	LGA 4189	3× 11.2 GT/s UPI	8× DDR4-3200	6 April 2021	CD8068904658201	$2742
Xeon Gold 6338	SRKJ9 (D2)	32 (64)	2 GHz	2.6/3.2 GHz	32 × 1.25 MB	48 MB	205 W	LGA 4189	3× 11.2 GT/s UPI	8× DDR4-3200	6 April 2021	CD8068904572501	$2612
Xeon Gold 6338N	SRKY2 (D2)	32 (64)	2.2 GHz	2.7/3.5 GHz	32 × 1.25 MB	48 MB	185 W	LGA 4189	3× 11.2 GT/s UPI	8× DDR4-2666	6 April 2021	CD8068904722302	$2795
Xeon Gold 6342	SRKXA (M1)	24 (48)	2.8 GHz	3.3/3.5 GHz	24 × 1.25 MB	36 MB	230 W	LGA 4189	3× 11.2 GT/s UPI	8× DDR4-3200	6 April 2021	CD8068904657701	$2529
Xeon Gold 6346	SRKHN (D2)	16 (32)	3.1 GHz	3.6/3.6 GHz	16 × 1.25 MB	36 MB	205 W	LGA 4189	3× 11.2 GT/s UPI	8× DDR4-3200	6 April 2021	CD8068904570201	$2300
Xeon Gold 6348	SRKHP (D2)	28 (56)	2.6 GHz	3.4/3.5 GHz	28 × 1.25 MB	42 MB	235 W	LGA 4189	3× 11.2 GT/s UPI	8× DDR4-3200	6 April 2021	CD8068904572204	$3072
Xeon Gold 6354	SRKH7 (D2)	18 (36)	3 GHz	3.6/3.6 GHz	18 × 1.25 MB	39 MB	205 W	LGA 4189	3× 11.2 GT/s UPI	8× DDR4-3200	6 April 2021	CD8068904571601	$2445

=== Xeon Platinum (dual processor) ===
Model number	sSpec number	Cores (threads)	Frequency	Turbo Boost all-core/2.0 (/max. 3.0)	L2 cache	L3 cache	TDP	Socket	I/O bus	Memory	Release date	Part number(s)	Release price (USD)
Xeon Platinum 8331C	SRKHK (D2)	24 (48)	2.5 GHz	?/3.5 GHz	24 × 1.25 MB	36 MB	185 W	LGA 4189	3× 11.2 GT/s UPI	8× DDR4-3200			
Xeon Platinum 8333B	SRKHQ (D2)	24 (48)	2.6 GHz	3.1/3.5 GHz	24 × 1.25 MB	36 MB	205 W	LGA 4189	3× 11.2 GT/s UPI	8× DDR4-3200			
Xeon Platinum 8336C	SRKJ5 (D2)	32 (64)	2.3 GHz	?/3.5 GHz	32 × 1.25 MB	48 MB	230 W	LGA 4189	3× 11.2 GT/s UPI	8× DDR4-3200			
Xeon Platinum 8338C	SRKJ7 (D2)	32 (64)	2.6 GHz	?/3.5 GHz	32 × 1.25 MB	54 MB	250 W	LGA 4189	3× 11.2 GT/s UPI	8× DDR4-3200			
Xeon Platinum 8341C	SRKYJ	24 (48)	3 GHz	3.6/3.6 GHz	24 × 1.25 MB	36 MB	270 W	LGA 4189	3× 11.2 GT/s UPI	8× DDR4-3200			
Xeon Platinum 8347C	SRKJ6 (D2)	36 (72)	2.1 GHz	2.7/3.5 GHz	36 × 1.25 MB	54 MB	210 W	LGA 4189	3× 11.2 GT/s UPI	8× DDR4-3200			
Xeon Platinum 8350C	SRKHE (D2)	32 (64)	2.6 GHz	?/3.5 GHz	32 × 1.25 MB	MB	240 W	LGA 4189	3× 11.2 GT/s UPI	8× DDR4-3200			
Xeon Platinum 8351N	SRKJ3 (D2)	36 (72)	2.4 GHz	3.1/3.5 GHz	36 × 1.25 MB	54 MB	225 W	LGA 4189	3× 11.2 GT/s UPI	8× DDR4-2933	6 April 2021	CD8068904582702	$3027
Xeon Platinum 8352M	SRKYF (D2)	32 (64)	2.3 GHz	2.8/3.5 GHz	32 × 1.25 MB	48 MB	185 W	LGA 4189	3× 11.2 GT/s UPI	8× DDR4-3200	6 April 2021	CD8068904686504	$3864
Xeon Platinum 8352S	SRKJ8 (D2)	32 (64)	2.2 GHz	2.8/3.4 GHz	32 × 1.25 MB	48 MB	205 W	LGA 4189	3× 11.2 GT/s UPI	8× DDR4-3200	6 April 2021	CD8068904642802	$4046
Xeon Platinum 8352V	SRKJ2 (D2)	36 (72)	2.1 GHz	2.5/3.5 GHz	36 × 1.25 MB	54 MB	195 W	LGA 4189	3× 11.2 GT/s UPI	8× DDR4-2933	6 April 2021	CD8068904571501	$3450
Xeon Platinum 8352Y	SRKHG (D2)	32 (64)	2.2 GHz	2.8/3.4 GHz	32 × 1.25 MB	48 MB	205 W	LGA 4189	3× 11.2 GT/s UPI	8× DDR4-3200	6 April 2021	CD8068904572401	$3450
Xeon Platinum 8357C	SRKJ4 (D2)	32 (64)	2.7 GHz	3.2/3.5 GHz	32 × 1.25 MB	48 MB	240 W	LGA 4189	3× 11.2 GT/s UPI	8× DDR4-3200			
Xeon Platinum 8358	SRKJ1 (D2)	32 (64)	2.6 GHz	3.3/3.4 GHz	32 × 1.25 MB	48 MB	250 W	LGA 4189	3× 11.2 GT/s UPI	8× DDR4-3200	6 April 2021	CD8068904572302	$3950
Xeon Platinum 8358P	SRKJ0 (D2)	32 (64)	2.6 GHz	3.3/3.4 GHz	32 × 1.25 MB	48 MB	240 W	LGA 4189	3× 11.2 GT/s UPI	8× DDR4-3200	6 April 2021	CD8068904599101	$3950
Xeon Platinum 8360Y	SRKHF (D2)	36 (72)	2.4 GHz	3.1/3.5 GHz	36 × 1.25 MB	54 MB	250 W	LGA 4189	3× 11.2 GT/s UPI	8× DDR4-3200	6 April 2021	CD8068904571901	$4702
Xeon Platinum 8361C	SRKYL (D2)	38 (76)	2.1 GHz	?/3.5 GHz GHz	38 × 1.25 MB	57 MB	215 W	LGA 4189	3× 11.2 GT/s UPI	8× DDR4-3200			
Xeon Platinum 8362	SRKY3 (D2)	32 (64)	2.8 GHz	3.5/3.6 GHz	32 × 1.25 MB	48 MB	265 W	LGA 4189	3× 11.2 GT/s UPI	8× DDR4-3200	6 April 2021	CD8068904722404	$5488
Xeon Platinum 8365B	SRKHS (D2)	32 (64)	2.6 GHz	?/? GHz	32 × 1.25 MB	48 MB		LGA 4189	3× 11.2 GT/s UPI	8× DDR4-3200			
Xeon Platinum 8367B		32 (64)	3.1 GHz	?/3.6 GHz	32 × 1.25 MB	48 MB	300 W	LGA 4189	3× 11.2 GT/s UPI	8× DDR4-3200			
Xeon Platinum 8368	SRKH8 (D2)	38 (76)	2.4 GHz	3.2/3.4 GHz	38 × 1.25 MB	57 MB	270 W	LGA 4189	3× 11.2 GT/s UPI	8× DDR4-3200	6 April 2021	CD8068904572001	$6302
Xeon Platinum 8368Q	SRKHX (D2)	38 (76)	2.6 GHz	3.3/3.7 GHz	38 × 1.25 MB	57 MB	270 W	LGA 4189	3× 11.2 GT/s UPI	8× DDR4-3200	6 April 2021	CD8068904582803	$6743
Xeon Platinum 8369B	SRKHJ (D2)	32 (64)	2.9 GHz	3.5/3.5 GHz	32 × 1.25 MB	48 MB	270 W	LGA 4189	3× 11.2 GT/s UPI	8× DDR4-3200			
Xeon Platinum 8370C	SRKHC (D2)	32 (64)	2.8 GHz	3.5/3.5 GHz	32 × 1.25 MB	48 MB	270 W	LGA 4189	3× 11.2 GT/s UPI	8× DDR4-3200			
Xeon Platinum 8372C	SRKHY (D2)	28 (56)	3.2 GHz	3.5/3.5 GHz	28 × 1.25 MB	42 MB	300 W	LGA 4189	3× 11.2 GT/s UPI	8× DDR4-3200			
Xeon Platinum 8373C	SRKHB (D2)	36 (72)	2.6 GHz	3.4/3.5 GHz	36 × 1.25 MB	54 MB	300 W	LGA 4189	3× 11.2 GT/s UPI	8× DDR4-3200			
Xeon Platinum 8374B	SRKYK (D2)	38 (76)	2.7 GHz	3.4/3.6 GHz	38 × 1.25 MB	57 MB	280 W	LGA 4189	3× 11.2 GT/s UPI	8× DDR4-3200			
Xeon Platinum 8374C	SRKHD (D2)	36 (72)	2.7 GHz	3.3/3.5 GHz	36 × 1.25 MB	54 MB	270 W	LGA 4189	3× 11.2 GT/s UPI	8× DDR4-3200			
Xeon Platinum 8375C	SRKHA,SRKUS (D2)	32 (64)	2.9 GHz	3.5/3.5 GHz	32 × 1.25 MB	54 MB	300 W	LGA 4189	3× 11.2 GT/s UPI	8× DDR4-3200			
Xeon Platinum 8377A		36 (72)	2.8 GHz	?/3.5 GHz	36 × 1.25 MB	54 MB	330 W	LGA 4189	3× 11.2 GT/s UPI	8× DDR4-3200			
Xeon Platinum 8377C	SRKHW,SRKUT (D2)	32 (64)	3 GHz	3.5/3.5 GHz	32 × 1.25 MB	54 MB	330 W	LGA 4189	3× 11.2 GT/s UPI	8× DDR4-3200			
Xeon Platinum 8377D		32 (64)	3 GHz	?/? GHz	32 × 1.25 MB	54 MB	? W	LGA 4189	3× 11.2 GT/s UPI	8× DDR4-3200			
Xeon Platinum 8378A	SRKHT (D2)	32 (64)	3 GHz	3.5/3.5 GHz	32 × 1.25 MB	48 MB	300 W	LGA 4189	3× 11.2 GT/s UPI	8× DDR4-3200			
Xeon Platinum 8378C	SRKYP	38 (76)	2.8 GHz	3.5/3.6 GHz	38 × 1.25 MB	57 MB	290 W	LGA 4189	3× 11.2 GT/s UPI	8× DDR4-3200			
Xeon Platinum 8380	SRKHR (D2)	40 (80)	2.3 GHz	3.0/3.4 GHz	40 × 1.25 MB	60 MB	270 W	LGA 4189	3× 11.2 GT/s UPI	8× DDR4-3200	6 April 2021	CD8068904572601	$8099
Xeon Platinum 8383C	SRM91	40 (80)	2.7 GHz	3.6 GHz GHz	40 × 1.25 MB	60 MB	330 W	LGA 4189	3× 11.2 GT/s UPI	8× DDR4-3200			

== "Ice Lake-W" (10 nm) ==
=== Xeon W-3300 (uniprocessor) ===
- PCI Express lanes: 64
- Supports up to 16 DIMMs of DDR4 memory, maximum 4 TB.

Model number	sSpec number	Cores (threads)	Frequency	Turbo Boost all-core/2.0 (/max. 3.0)	L2 cache	L3 cache	TDP	Socket	I/O bus	Memory	Release date	Part number(s)	Release price (USD)
Xeon W-3323	SRKWT (M1)	12 (24)	3.5 GHz	?/3.9 GHz	12 × 1.25 MB	21 MB	220 W	LGA 4189	DMI 3.0	8× DDR4-3200	29 July 2021	CD8068904708502	$949
Xeon W-3335	SRKWS (M1)	16 (32)	3.4 GHz	?/4.0 GHz	16 × 1.25 MB	24 MB	250 W	LGA 4189	DMI 3.0	8× DDR4-3200	29 July 2021	CD8068904708401	$1299
Xeon W-3345	SRKSU (D2)	24 (48)	3 GHz	?/4.0 GHz	24 × 1.25 MB	36 MB	250 W	LGA 4189	DMI 3.0	8× DDR4-3200	29 July 2021	CD8068904691101	$2499
Xeon W-3365	SRKSW (D2)	32 (64)	2.7 GHz	?/4.0 GHz	32 × 1.25 MB	48 MB	270 W	LGA 4189	DMI 3.0	8× DDR4-3200	29 July 2021	CD8068904691303	$3499
Xeon W-3375	SRKSX (D2)	38 (76)	2.5 GHz	?/4.0 GHz	38 × 1.25 MB	57 MB	270 W	LGA 4189	DMI 3.0	8× DDR4-3200	29 July 2021	CD8068904691401	$4499
