= List of Intel Xeon processors (Rocket Lake-based) =

== "Rocket Lake-S" (14 nm) ==
Common features:

- All processors support DDR4-3200 ECC memory.

=== Xeon W-13xx (workstation, uniprocessor) ===
- -E: embedded
- -P: high performance (and power), with cTDP down to 95 W
- -T: low power, with cTDP down to 25 W

Model number	sSpec number	Cores (threads)	Frequency	Turbo	L2 cache	L3 cache	GPU model	GPU frequency	TDP	Socket	I/O bus	Release date	Part number(s)	Release price (USD)
Standard power
Xeon W-1350	SRKPA (B0)	6 (12)	3.3 GHz	5.0 GHz	6 × 512 KB	12 MB	UHD Graphics P750	350-1300 MHz	80 W	LGA 1200	DMI 3.0 ×8	May 2021	CM8070804497911; BX80708W1350	$255
Xeon W-1370	SRKP8 (B0)	8 (16)	2.9 GHz	5.1 GHz	8 × 512 KB	16 MB	UHD Graphics P750	350-1300 MHz	80 W	LGA 1200	DMI 3.0 ×8	May 2021	CM8070804497713; BX80708W1370	$362
Xeon W-1390	SRKP5 (B0)	8 (16)	2.8 GHz	5.1 GHz (5.2 w/ TVB)	8 × 512 KB	16 MB	UHD Graphics P750	350-1300 MHz	80 W	LGA 1200	DMI 3.0 ×8	May 2021	CM8070804497319; BX80708W1390	$494
High power
Xeon W-1350P	SRKP9 (B0)	6 (12)	4 GHz	5.1 GHz	6 × 512 KB	12 MB	UHD Graphics P750	350-1300 MHz	125 W	LGA 1200	DMI 3.0 ×8	May 2021	CM8070804497812; BX80708W1350P	$311
Xeon W-1370P	SRKP7 (B0)	8 (16)	3.6 GHz	5.2 GHz	8 × 512 KB	16 MB	UHD Graphics P750	350-1300 MHz	125 W	LGA 1200	DMI 3.0 ×8	May 2021	CM8070804497616; BX80708W1370P	$428
Xeon W-1390P	SRKQA (B0)	8 (16)	3.5 GHz	5.2 GHz (5.3 w/ TVB)	8 × 512 KB	16 MB	UHD Graphics P750	350-1300 MHz	125 W	LGA 1200	DMI 3.0 ×8	May 2021	CM8070804497213	$539
Low power
Xeon W-1390T	SRKP6 (B0)	8 (16)	1.5 GHz	4.9 GHz	8 × 512 KB	16 MB	UHD Graphics P750	350-1200 MHz	35 W	LGA 1200	DMI 3.0 ×8	May 2021	CM8070804497518	$494

=== Xeon E-23xx (server, uniprocessor) ===
- Xeon E-2x_{1}x_{2}x_{3}: x_{1} represents the generation. x_{3} represents the number of cores.
- No suffix letter: without integrated GPU
- -G: with integrated GPU

Model number	sSpec number	Cores (threads)	Frequency	Turbo	L2 cache	L3 cache	GPU model	GPU frequency	TDP	Socket	I/O bus	Release date	Part number(s)	Release price (USD)
Xeon E-2314	SRKN8 (B0)	4 (4)	2.8 GHz	4.5 GHz	4 × 512 KB	8 MB	—N/a	—N/a	65 W	LGA 1200	DMI 3.0 ×8	September 2021	CM8070804496113	$182
Xeon E-2324G	SRKN7 (B0)	4 (4)	3.1 GHz	4.6 GHz	4 × 512 KB	8 MB	UHD Graphics P750	350-1300 MHz	65 W	LGA 1200	DMI 3.0 ×8	September 2021	CM8070804496015; BX80708E2324G	$209 $219
Xeon E-2334	SRKN6 (B0)	4 (8)	3.4 GHz	4.8 GHz	4 × 512 KB	8 MB	—N/a	—N/a	65 W	LGA 1200	DMI 3.0 ×8	September 2021	CM8070804495913; BX80708E2334	$250 $261
Xeon E-2336	SRKN5 (B0)	6 (12)	2.9 GHz	4.8 GHz	6 × 512 KB	12 MB	—N/a	—N/a	65 W	LGA 1200	DMI 3.0 ×8	September 2021	CM8070804495816; BX80708E2336	$284 $294
Xeon E-2356G	SRKN2 (B0)	6 (12)	3.2 GHz	5.0 GHz	6 × 512 KB	12 MB	UHD Graphics P750	350-1300 MHz	80 W	LGA 1200	DMI 3.0 ×8	September 2021	CM8070804495016	$311
Xeon E-2374G	SRKN3 (B0)	4 (8)	3.7 GHz	5.0 GHz	4 × 512 KB	8 MB	UHD Graphics P750	350-1300 MHz	80 W	LGA 1200	DMI 3.0 ×8	September 2021	CM8070804495216; BX80708E2374G	$334 $345
Xeon E-2378	SRKN4 (B0)	8 (16)	2.6 GHz	4.8 GHz	8 × 512 KB	16 MB	—N/a	—N/a	65 W	LGA 1200	DMI 3.0 ×8	September 2021	CM8070804495612	$362
Xeon E-2378G	SRKN1 (B0)	8 (16)	2.8 GHz	5.1 GHz	8 × 512 KB	16 MB	UHD Graphics P750	350-1300 MHz	80 W	LGA 1200	DMI 3.0 ×8	September 2021	CM8070804494916; BX80708E2378G	$494 $505
Xeon E-2386G	SRKN0 (B0)	6 (12)	3.5 GHz	5.1 GHz	6 × 512 KB	12 MB	UHD Graphics P750	350-1300 MHz	95 W	LGA 1200	DMI 3.0 ×8	September 2021	CM8070804494716	$450
Xeon E-2388G	SRKMZ (B0)	8 (16)	3.2 GHz	5.1 GHz	8 × 512 KB	16 MB	UHD Graphics P750	350-1300 MHz	95 W	LGA 1200	DMI 3.0 ×8	September 2021	CM8070804494617	$539
