= List of Intel Xeon processors (Coffee Lake-based) =

== "Coffee Lake-S WS" (14 nm) ==
Common features:

- All processors support DDR4-2666 ECC memory.

=== Xeon E-2xxx (uniprocessor) ===
- Xeon E-2x_{1}x_{2}x_{3}: x_{1} represents the generation. x_{3} represents the number of cores.
- No suffix letter: without integrated GPU
- -G: with integrated GPU
- -M: BGA mobile processor
- -L: low power
- -E: embedded

Model number	sSpec number	Cores (threads)	Frequency	Turbo	L2 cache	L3 cache	GPU model	GPU frequency	TDP	Socket	I/O bus	Release date	Part number(s)	Release price (USD)
Standard power
Xeon E-2104G	SR3WV (U0)	4 (4)	3.2 GHz	—N/a	4 × 256 KB	8 MB	HD Graphics P630	350-1100 MHz	65 W	LGA 1151	DMI 3.0	12 July 2018	CM8068403653917	$193
Xeon E-2124	SR3WQ (U0)	4 (4)	3.3 GHz	6/8/9/10	4 × 256 KB	8 MB	—N/a	—N/a	71 W	LGA 1151	DMI 3.0	12 July 2018	CM8068403654114; BX80684E2124	$193 $198
Xeon E-2124G	SR3WL (U0)	4 (4)	3.4 GHz	7/8/10/11	4 × 256 KB	8 MB	HD Graphics P630	350–1150 MHz	71 W	LGA 1151	DMI 3.0	12 July 2018	CM8068403654114; BX80684E2124G	$213 $218
Xeon E-2126G	SR3WU (U0)	6 (6)	3.3 GHz	8/9/9/10/11/12	6 × 256 KB	12 MB	HD Graphics P630	350–1150 MHz	80 W	LGA 1151	DMI 3.0	12 July 2018	CM8068403380219	$255
Xeon E-2134	SR3WP (U0)	4 (8)	3.5 GHz	7/8/9/10	4 × 256 KB	8 MB	—N/a	—N/a	71 W	LGA 1151	DMI 3.0	12 July 2018	CM8068403654319; BX80684E2134	$250 $256
Xeon E-2136	SR3WW (U0)	6 (12)	3.3 GHz	9/10/10/10/11/12	6 × 256 KB	12 MB	—N/a	—N/a	80 W	LGA 1151	DMI 3.0	12 July 2018	CM8068403654318; BX80684E2136	$284 $289
Xeon E-2144G	SR3WM (U0)	4 (8)	3.6 GHz	6/7/8/9	4 × 256 KB	8 MB	HD Graphics P630	350–1200 MHz	71 W	LGA 1151	DMI 3.0	12 July 2018	CM8068403654220	$272
Xeon E-2146G	SR3WT (U0)	6 (12)	3.5 GHz	7/8/8/8/9/10	6 × 256 KB	12 MB	HD Graphics P630	350–1200 MHz	80 W	LGA 1151	DMI 3.0	12 July 2018	CM8068403380116; BX80684E2146G	$311 $317
Xeon E-2174G	SR3WN (U0)	4 (8)	3.8 GHz	5/6/7/9	4 × 256 KB	8 MB	HD Graphics P630	350–1200 MHz	71 W	LGA 1151	DMI 3.0	12 July 2018	CM8068403654221; BX80684E2174G	$328 $334
Xeon E-2176G	SR3WS (U0)	6 (12)	3.7 GHz	6/7/7/8/9/10	6 × 256 KB	12 MB	HD Graphics P630	350–1200 MHz	80 W	LGA 1151	DMI 3.0	12 July 2018	CM8068403380018; BX80684E2176G	$362 $367
Xeon E-2186G	SR3WR (U0)	6 (12)	3.8 GHz	5/6/7/8/8/9	6 × 256 KB	12 MB	HD Graphics P630	350–1200 MHz	95 W	LGA 1151	DMI 3.0	12 July 2018	CM8068403379918	$450
Xeon E-2224	SRFAV (U0)	4 (4)	3.4 GHz	8/10/11/12	4 × 256 KB	8 MB	—N/a	—N/a	71 W	LGA 1151	DMI 3.0	29 May 2019	CM8068404174707; BX80684E2224	$193
Xeon E-2224G	SRFAW (U0)	4 (4)	3.5 GHz	9/10/11/12	4 × 256 KB	8 MB	HD Graphics P630	350–1200 MHz	71 W	LGA 1151	DMI 3.0	29 May 2019	CM8068404173806; BX80684E2224G	$213
Xeon E-2226G	SRF7F (U0)	6 (6)	3.4 GHz	10/11/11/12/12/13	6 × 256 KB	12 MB	HD Graphics P630	350–1200 MHz	80 W	LGA 1151	DMI 3.0	29 May 2019	CM8068404174503; BX80684E2226G	$255
Xeon E-2234	SRFAX (U0)	4 (8)	3.6 GHz	9/10/11/12	4 × 256 KB	8 MB	—N/a	—N/a	71 W	LGA 1151	DMI 3.0	29 May 2019	CM8068404174806; BX80684E2234	$250
Xeon E-2236	SRF7G (U0)	6 (12)	3.4 GHz	11/12/12/13/13/14	6 × 256 KB	12 MB	—N/a	—N/a	80 W	LGA 1151	DMI 3.0	29 May 2019	CM8068404174603; BX80684E2236	$284
Xeon E-2244G	SRFAY (U0)	4 (8)	3.8 GHz	7/8/9/10	4 × 256 KB	8 MB	HD Graphics P630	350–1200 MHz	71 W	LGA 1151	DMI 3.0	29 May 2019	CM8068404175105	$272
Xeon E-2246G	SRF7N (U0)	6 (12)	3.6 GHz	9/10/10/11/11/12	6 × 256 KB	12 MB	HD Graphics P630	350–1200 MHz	80 W	LGA 1151	DMI 3.0	29 May 2019	CM8068404227903	$311
Xeon E-2274G	SRFDE (U0)	4 (8)	4 GHz	4/6/8/9	4 × 256 KB	8 MB	HD Graphics P630	350–1200 MHz	83 W	LGA 1151	DMI 3.0	29 May 2019	CM8068404174407; BX80684E2274G	$328
Xeon E-2276G	SRF7M (U0)	6 (12)	3.8 GHz	8/9/9/10/10/11	6 × 256 KB	12 MB	HD Graphics P630	350–1200 MHz	80 W	LGA 1151	DMI 3.0	29 May 2019	CM8068404227703	$362
Xeon E-2278G	SRFB2 (R0)	8 (16)	3.4 GHz	12/12/13/14/14/15/15/16	8 × 256 KB	16 MB	HD Graphics P630	350–1200 MHz	80 W	LGA 1151	DMI 3.0	29 May 2019	CM8068404225303	$494
Xeon E-2286G	SRF7C (U0)	6 (12)	4 GHz	6/7/7/8/8/9	6 × 256 KB	12 MB	HD Graphics P630	350–1200 MHz	95 W	LGA 1151	DMI 3.0	29 May 2019	CM8068404173706	$450
Xeon E-2288G	SRFB3 (R0)	8 (16)	3.7 GHz	10/10/10/11/11/12/12/13	8 × 256 KB	16 MB	HD Graphics P630	350–1200 MHz	95 W	LGA 1151	DMI 3.0	29 May 2019	CM8068404224102	$539
Standard power, embedded
Xeon E-2226GE	SRGQW (U0)	6 (6)	3.4 GHz	4.6 GHz	6 × 256 KB	12 MB	HD Graphics P630	350–1200 MHz	80 W	LGA 1151	DMI 3.0	11 June 2019	CM8068404405020	OEM
Xeon E-2278GE	SRGDY (R0)	8 (16)	3.3 GHz	4.7 GHz	8 × 256 KB	16 MB	HD Graphics P630	350–1200 MHz	80 W	LGA 1151	DMI 3.0	11 June 2019	CM8068404196302	OEM
Low power, embedded
Xeon E-2278GEL	SRGE2 (R0)	8 (16)	2 GHz	3.9 GHz	8 × 256 KB	16 MB	HD Graphics P630	350–1200 MHz	35 W	LGA 1151	DMI 3.0	11 June 2019	CM8068404311303	OEM

== "Coffee Lake-H" (14 nm) ==
=== Xeon E-2xxxM (uniprocessor) ===
Xeon E-2186M & 2286M support Intel Thermal Velocity Boost.

Model number	sSpec number	Cores (threads)	Frequency	Turbo	L2 cache	L3 cache	GPU model	GPU frequency	TDP	Socket	I/O bus	Release date	Part number(s)	Release price (USD)
Standard power, mobile
Xeon E-2176M	SR3YX (U0)	6 (12)	2.7 GHz	14/15/15/16/16/17	6 × 256 KB	12 MB	UHD Graphics 630	350–1200 MHz	45 W	BGA 1440	DMI 3.0	April 2018	CL8068403359116	$450
Xeon E-2186M	SRCKQ (U0)	6 (12)	2.9 GHz	14/15/16/18/19/19	6 × 256 KB	12 MB	UHD Graphics 630	350–1200 MHz	45 W	BGA 1440	DMI 3.0	April 2018	CL8068403359021	$623
Xeon E-2276M	SRFCK (R0)	6 (12)	2.8 GHz	4.7 GHz	6 × 256 KB	12 MB	UHD Graphics 630	350–1200 MHz	45 W	BGA 1440	DMI 3.0	May 2019	CL8068404068806	$450
Xeon E-2286M	SRFCZ (R0)	8 (16)	2.4 GHz	5.0 GHz	8 × 256 KB	16 MB	UHD Graphics 630	350–1250 MHz	45 W	BGA 1440	DMI 3.0	May 2019	CL8068404068710	$623
Standard power, embedded
Xeon E-2254ME	SRFEM (U0)	4 (8)	2.6 GHz	3.8 GHz	4 × 256 KB	8 MB	UHD Graphics 630	350–1100 MHz	45 W	BGA 1440	DMI 3.0	June 2019	CL8068404175200	OEM
Xeon E-2276ME	SRFEC (U0)	6 (12)	2.8 GHz	4.5 GHz	6 × 256 KB	12 MB	UHD Graphics 630	350–1150 MHz	45 W	BGA 1440	DMI 3.0	June 2019	CL8068404164700	OEM
Low power, embedded
Xeon E-2254ML	SRFEJ (U0)	4 (8)	1.7 GHz	3.5 GHz	4 × 256 KB	8 MB	UHD Graphics 630	350–1100 MHz	25 W	BGA 1440	DMI 3.0	June 2019	CL8068404165301	OEM
Xeon E-2276ML	SRFEG (U0)	6 (12)	2 GHz	4.2 GHz	6 × 256 KB	12 MB	UHD Graphics 630	350–1150 MHz	25 W	BGA 1440	DMI 3.0	June 2019	CL8068404165100	OEM
