= List of Intel Xeon processors (NetBurst-based) =

This is a list of NetBurst-based Intel Xeon processors.

== Xeon DP (later Xeon 5000 series) ==
=== "Foster" (180 nm) ===
- Based on NetBurst microarchitecture
- All models support: MMX, SSE, SSE2
- All models support dual-processor configurations
- Die size: 241 mm²
- Steppings: C1, D0

Model number	sSpec number	Frequency	L2 cache	Front side bus	Multiplier	Voltage	TDP	Socket	Release date	Part number(s)	Release price (USD)
Xeon 1.4	SL4WX (C1); SL56G (C1)	1.4 GHz	256 KB	400 MT/s	14×	1.75 V	56 W	Socket 603	May 21, 2001	RN80528KC017G0K	$268
Xeon 1.5	SL4ZT (C1); SL5U6 (D0); SL4WY (C1); SL5TD (D0)	1.5 GHz	256 KB	400 MT/s	15×	1.75 V	59.2 W	Socket 603	May 21, 2001	RN80528KC021G0K	$309
Xeon 1.7	SL56N (C1); SL5U7 (D0); SL56H (C1); SL5TE (D0)	1.7 GHz	256 KB	400 MT/s	17×	1.75 V	65.8 W	Socket 603	May 21, 2001	RN80528KC029G0K	$406
Xeon 2.0	SL5U8 (D0); SL5TH (D0)	2.0 GHz	256 KB	400 MT/s	20×	1.75 V	77.5 W	Socket 603	September 25, 2001	RN80528KC041G0K	$615

=== "Prestonia" (130 nm) ===
- Based on NetBurst microarchitecture
- All models support: MMX, SSE, SSE2, Hyper-Threading
- All models support dual-processor configurations
- Models with no suffix or the A suffix use Socket 603 and a 400 MT/s FSB while models with the B suffix use Socket 604 and a 533 MT/s FSB.
- Die size: 146 mm²
- Steppings: B0, C1, D1, M0

Model number	sSpec number	Frequency	L2 cache	Front side bus	Multiplier	Voltage	TDP	Socket	Release date	Part number(s)	Release price (USD)
Standard voltage
Xeon 1.8	SL5Z8 (B0); SL622 (B0); SL6EL (C1); SL6JX (C1); SL6W3 (D1); SL6YS (D1)	1.8 GHz	512 KB	400 MT/s	18×	1.5 V	55 W	Socket 603	February 25, 2002	RN80532KC033512; BX80532KC1800D	$251
Xeon 2.0A	SL5Z9 (B0); SL623 (B0); SL6EM (C1); SL6JY (C1); SL6W6 (D1); SL6YT (D1)	2.0 GHz	512 KB	400 MT/s	20×	1.5 V	58 W	Socket 603	February 25, 2002	RN80532KC041512; BX80532KC2000D	$417
Xeon 2.0B	SL6NP (C1); SL6RQ (C1); SL6VK (D1); SL6YM (D1); SL72C (M0); SL73K (M0)	2.0 GHz	512 KB	533 MT/s	15×	1.5 V	58 W	Socket 604	November 18, 2002	RK80532KE041512	$198
Xeon 2.2	SL5ZA (B0); SL624 (B0); SL6EN (C1); SL6JZ (C1); SL6W7 (D1); SL6YU (D1)	2.2 GHz	512 KB	400 MT/s	22×	1.5 V	61 W	Socket 603	February 25, 2002	RN80532KC049512; BX80532KC2200D	$615
Xeon 2.4	SL65T (B0); SL687 (B0); SL6EP (C1); SL6K2 (C1); SL6W8 (D1); SL6YV (D1)	2.4 GHz	512 KB	400 MT/s	24×	1.5 V	65 W	Socket 603	April 23, 2002	RN80532KC056512; BX80532KC2400D	$615
Xeon 2.4B	SL6GD (C1); SL6NQ (C1); SL6VL (D1); SL6YN (D1); SL72D (M0); SL73L (M0)	2.4 GHz	512 KB	533 MT/s	18×	1.5 V	65 W	Socket 604	November 18, 2002	RK80532KE056512	$234
Xeon 2.6	SL6EQ (C1); SL6K3 (C1); SL6W9 (D1); SL6YW (D1)	2.6 GHz	512 KB	400 MT/s	26×	1.5 V	60 W	Socket 603	September 11, 2002	RN80532KC064512; BX80532KC2600D	$433
Xeon 2.66	SL6GF (C1); SL6NR (C1); SL6VM (D1); SL6YP (D1); SL72E (M0); SL73M (M0)	2.67 GHz	512 KB	533 MT/s	20×	1.5 V	72/77 W	Socket 604	November 18, 2002	RK80532KE067512	$337
Xeon 2.8	SL6M7 (C1); SL6MS (C1); SL6WA (D1); SL6YX (D1)	2.8 GHz	512 KB	400 MT/s	28×	1.5 V	74 W	Socket 603	September 11, 2002	RN80532KC072512; BX80532KC2800D	$562
Xeon 2.8B	SL6GG (C1); SL6NS (C1); SL6VN (D1); SL6YQ (D1); SL72F (M0); SL73N (M0)	2.8 GHz	512 KB	533 MT/s	21×	1.5 V	74 W	Socket 604	November 18, 2002	RK80532KE072512	$455
Xeon 3.0	SL6VW (C1); SL6X4 (C1); SL6WB (D1); SL6YY (D1)	3.0 GHz	512 KB	400 MT/s	30×	1.525 V	85 W	Socket 603	March 10, 2003	RN80532KC080512	$658
Xeon 3.06	SL6GH (C1); SL6RR (C1); SL6VP (D1); SL6YR (D1)	3.06 GHz	512 KB	533 MT/s	23×	1.525 V	85 W	Socket 604	March 10, 2003	RK80532KE083512	$722
Low voltage
Xeon LV 1.6	SL6XK (D1)	1.6 GHz	512 KB	400 MT/s	16×	1.187–1.274 V	30 W	Socket 604	September 2003	RK80532EC025512	
Xeon LV 2.0	SL6XL (D1)	2.0 GHz	512 KB	400 MT/s	20x	1.179–1.27 V	35 W	Socket 604	September 2003	RK80532EC041512	
Xeon LV 2.4	SL74T (D1)	2.4 GHz	512 KB	533 MT/s	18×	1.17–1.265 V	40 W	Socket 604	September 2003	RK80532EE056512	

=== "Gallatin" (130 nm) ===
- Based on NetBurst microarchitecture
- All models support: MMX, SSE, SSE2, Hyper-Threading
- All models support dual-processor configurations
- Die size: 226 mm²
- Steppings: M0

Model number	sSpec number	Frequency	L2 cache	L3 cache	Front side bus	Multiplier	Voltage	TDP	Socket	Release date	Part number(s)	Release price
Xeon 2.4	SL7D4 (M0); SL7DF (M0)	2.4 GHz	512 KB	1024 KB	533 MT/s	18×	1.525 V	77 W	Socket 604	February 2004	RK80532KE0561M	
Xeon 2.8	SL7D5 (M0); SL7DG (M0)	2.8 GHz	512 KB	1024 KB	533 MT/s	21×	1.525 V	77 W	Socket 604	February 2004	RK80532KE0721M	
Xeon 3.06	SL72G (M0); SL73P (M0)	3.06 GHz	512 KB	1024 KB	533 MT/s	23×	1.525 V	87 W	Socket 604	July 14, 2003	RK80532KE0831M	$690
Xeon 3.2	SL72Y (M0); SL73Q (M0)	3.2 GHz	512 KB	1024 KB	533 MT/s	24×	1.525 V	92 W	Socket 604	October 6, 2003	RK80532KE0881M	$851
Xeon 3.2	SL7AE (M0); SL7BW (M0)	3.2 GHz	512 KB	2048 KB	533 MT/s	24×	1.525 V	92 W	Socket 604	February 2004	RK80532KE0882M	

=== "Nocona" (90 nm) ===
- Based on NetBurst microarchitecture
- All models support: MMX, SSE, SSE2, SSE3, Hyper-Threading, Intel 64
- All models support dual-processor configurations
- 2.8 GHz and 3.0 GHz models with no suffix are OEM models are tray processors while those with the D suffix are boxed one. All other are tray/boxed processors.
- Die size: 140 mm²
- Steppings: D0, E0, F1, G1

Model number	sSpec number	Frequency	L2 cache	Front side bus	Mult	Voltage	TDP	Socket	Release date	Part number(s)	Release price (USD)
Standard voltage
Xeon 2.8	SL7DV (D0); SL7HF (D0); SL7TB (E0); SL84B (E0)	2.8 GHz	1024 KB	800 MT/s	14×	1.287–1.4 V	103 W	Socket 604	June 28, 2004	NE80546KG0721M	OEM
Xeon 2.8D	SL7PD (E0); SL8KN (G1)	2.8 GHz	1024 KB	800 MT/s	14×	1.287–1.4 V	103 W	Socket 604	June 28, 2004	B80546KG0721M	$209
Xeon 3.0	SL7DW (D0); SL7HG (D0); SL7TC (E0)	3.0 GHz	1024 KB	800 MT/s	15×	1.287–1.4 V	103 W	Socket 604	June 28, 2004	RK80546KG0801M	OEM
Xeon 3.0D	SL7PE (E0); SL8KP (G1)	3.0 GHz	1024 KB	800 MT/s	15×	1.287–1.4 V	103 W	Socket 604	June 28, 2004	NE80546KG0801M	$316
Xeon 3.2	SL7DX (D0); SL7HH (D0); SL7PF (E0); SL7TD (E0); SL8KQ (G1)	3.2 GHz	1024 KB	800 MT/s	16×	1.287–1.4 V	103 W	Socket 604	June 28, 2004	RK80546KG0881M	$455
Xeon 3.4	SL7DY (D0); SL7HJ (D0); SL7PG (E0); SL7TE (E0); SL8KR (G1)	3.4 GHz	1024 KB	800 MT/s	17×	1.287–1.4 V	103 W	Socket 604	June 28, 2004	RK80546KG0961M	$690
Xeon 3.6	SL7DZ (D0); SL7HK (D0); SL7PH (E0); SL7VF (E0); SL8KS (G1)	3.6 GHz	1024 KB	800 MT/s	18×	1.287–1.4 V	103 W	Socket 604	June 28, 2004	RK80546KG1041M	$851
Low voltage
Xeon LV 2.8	SL8RW (G0)	2.8 GHz	1024 KB	800 MT/s	14x	1.1125–1.2 V	55 W	Socket 604	October 2004	RK80546KG0721M	$260

=== "Irwindale" (90 nm) ===
- Based on NetBurst microarchitecture
- All models support: MMX, SSE, SSE2, SSE3, Hyper-Threading, EIST, XD bit (an NX bit implementation) and Intel 64.
- All models support dual-processor configurations
- Models with no suffix are tray processors with those with the E suffix are boxed processors.
- Die size: 135 mm²
- Steppings: N0, R0

Model number	sSpec number	Frequency	L2 cache	Front side bus	Mult	Voltage	TDP	Socket	Release date	Part number(s)	Release price (USD)
Standard voltage
Xeon 2.8	SL7ZG (N0); SL8ZR (N0)	2.8 GHz	2048 KB	800 MT/s	14×	1.25–1.388 V	110 W	Socket 604	September 26, 2005	RK80546KG0722MM	OEM
Xeon 2.8E	SL8P7 (R0)	2.8 GHz	2048 KB	800 MT/s	14×	1.25–1.388 V	110 W	Socket 604	September 26, 2005	NE80546KG0722MM	$209
Xeon 3.0	SL8ZQ (N0)	3.0 GHz	2048 KB	800 MT/s	15x	1.25–1.388 V	110 W	Socket 604	February 14, 2005	RK80546KG0802MM	OEM
Xeon 3.0E	SL7ZF (N0); SL8P6 (R0)	3.0 GHz	2048 KB	800 MT/s	15x	1.2875–1.3875 V	110 W	Socket 604	February 14, 2005	NE80546JG0802MM	$316
Xeon 3.2	SL7ZE (N0); SL8ZP (N0)	3.2 GHz	2048 KB	800 MT/s	16×	1.25–1.388 V	110 W	Socket 604	February 14, 2005	RK80546KG0882MM	OEM
Xeon 3.2E	SL943 (N0); SL8P5 (R0)	3.2 GHz	2048 KB	800 MT/s	16×	1.2875–1.3875 V	110 W	Socket 604	February 14, 2005	NE80546KG0882MM	$455
Xeon 3.4	SL7ZK (N0); SL7ZD (N0)	3.4 GHz	2048 KB	800 MT/s	17×	1.25–1.3875 V	110 W	Socket 604	February 14, 2005	RK80546KG0962MM	OEM
Xeon 3.4E	SL8P4 (R0)	3.4 GHz	2048 KB	800 MT/s	17×	1.2875–1.3875 V	110 W	Socket 604	February 14, 2005	NE80546KG0962MM	$690
Xeon 3.6	SL7ZC (N0); SL7ZJ (N0)	3.6 GHz	2048 KB	800 MT/s	18×	1.25–1.3875 V	110 W	Socket 604	February 14, 2005	RK80546KG1042MM	OEM
Xeon 3.6E	SL8P3 (R0)	3.6 GHz	2048 KB	800 MT/s	18×	1.2875–1.3875 V	110 W	Socket 604	February 14, 2005	NE80546KG1042MM	$851
Xeon 3.8	SL8ZJ (N0); SL7ZB (N0)	3.8 GHz	2048 KB	800 MT/s	19×	1.2875–1.3875 V	110 W	Socket 604	September 26, 2005	RK80546KG1122MM	OEM
Xeon 3.8E	SL93Z (N0); SL8ZM (N0); SL8ZN (N0); SL8ZK (N0); SL8P2 (R0)	3.8 GHz	2048 KB	800 MT/s	19×	1.2875–1.3875 V	110 W	Socket 604	September 26, 2005	NE80546KG0722M	$851
Medium voltage
Xeon MV 3.2	SL8T3 (R0)	3.2 GHz	2048 KB	800 MT/s	16×	1.2125–1.3875 V	90 W	Socket 604	September 26, 2005	NE80546QG0882MM	$487
Low voltage
Xeon LV 3.0	SL8SV (R0)	3.0 GHz	2048 KB	800 MT/s	15×	1.05–1.20 V	55 W	Socket 604	September 26, 2005	NE80546JG0802MM	$519

=== "Paxville DP" (90 nm) ===
- Based on NetBurst microarchitecture
- All models support: MMX, SSE, SSE2, SSE3, Hyper-Threading, Intel 64, XD bit (an NX bit implementation)
- All models support dual-processor configurations
- Die size: 206 mm²
- Steppings: A0

Model number	sSpec number	Frequency	L2 Cache	FSB	Mult	Voltage	TDP	Socket	Release date	Part number(s)	Release price (USD)
Xeon 2.8	SL8MA (A0)	2.8 GHz	2× 2048 KB	800 MT/s	14×	1.2875–1.4125 V	135 W	Socket 604	October 10, 2005	NE80551KG0724MM	$1043

=== "Dempsey" (65 nm) ===
- Based on NetBurst microarchitecture
- All models support: MMX, SSE, SSE2, SSE3, Hyper-Threading, Intel 64, XD bit (an NX bit implementation), Intel VT-x
- All models support dual-processor configurations
- Die size: 2× 81 mm²
- Demand Based Switching (Intel's Server EIST): Supported by: All except 5060, 5063.
- Die size: 291 mm²
- Steppings: C1

Model number	sSpec number	Frequency	L2 Cache	FSB	Mult	Voltage	TDP	Socket	Release date	Part number(s)	Release price (USD)
Standard voltage
Xeon 5020	SL96F (C1)	2.5 GHz	2× 2048 KB	667 MT/s	15x	1.075–1.35 V	95 W	LGA 771	2006	HH80555KF0604M BX805555020A BX805555020P || OEM	
Xeon 5030	SL96E (C1)	2.67 GHz	2× 2048 KB	667 MT/s	16×	1.075–1.35 V	95 W	LGA 771	May 23, 2006	HH80555KF0674M BX805555030A BX805555030P || $156	
Xeon 5040	SL96D (C1)	2.83 GHz	2× 2048 KB	667 MT/s	17×	1.075–1.35 V	95 W	LGA 771	2006	HH80555KF0734M BX805555040A	OEM
Xeon 5050	SL96C (C1)	3.0 GHz	2× 2048 KB	667 MT/s	18×	1.075–1.35 V	95 W	LGA 771	May 23, 2006	HH80555KF0804M BX805555050A BX805555050P || $177	
Xeon 5060	SL96A (C1)	3.2 GHz	2× 2048 KB	1066 MT/s	12×	1.075–1.35 V	130 W	LGA 771	May 23, 2006	HH80555KH0884M BX805555060A BX805555060P || $316	
Xeon 5070	SL969 (C1)	3.46 GHz	2× 2048 KB	1066 MT/s	13×	1.075–1.35 V	130 W	LGA 771	2006	HH80555KH0994M BX805555070A BX805555070P || OEM	
Xeon 5080	SL968 (C1)	3.73 GHz	2× 2048 KB	1066 MT/s	14×	1.075–1.35 V	130 W	LGA 771	May 23, 2006	HH80555KH1094M BX805555080A BX805555080P || $851	
Medium voltage
Xeon 5063	SL96B (C1)	3.2 GHz	2× 2048 KB	1066 MT/s	12×	1.075–1.35 V	95 W	LGA 771	May 23, 2006	HH80555QH0884M	$369

== Xeon MP (later Xeon 7000 series) ==
=== "Foster MP" (180 nm) ===
- Based on NetBurst microarchitecture
- All models support: MMX, SSE, SSE2, Hyper-Threading
- All models support quad-processor and octo-processor configurations
- Die size: 241 mm²
- Steppings: C0

Model number	sSpec number	Frequency	L2 cache	L3 cache	Front side bus	Multiplier	Voltage	TDP	Socket	Release date	Part number(s)	Release price (USD)
Xeon MP 1.4	SL5FZ (C0); SL5RV (C0)	1.4 GHz	256 KB	512 KB	400 MT/s	14×	1.75 V	64 W	Socket 603	March 12, 2002	YF80528KC017512	$1177
Xeon MP 1.5	SL5G2 (C0); SL5RW (C0)	1.5 GHz	256 KB	512 KB	400 MT/s	15×	1.75 V	68 W	Socket 603	March 12, 2002	YF80528KC021512	$1980
Xeon MP 1.6	SL5G8 (C0); SL5S4 (C0)	1.6 GHz	256 KB	1024 KB	400 MT/s	16×	1.75 V	72 W	Socket 603	March 12, 2002	YF80528KC0251M	$3692

=== "Gallatin" (130 nm) ===
- Based on NetBurst microarchitecture
- All models support: MMX, SSE, SSE2, Hyper-Threading
- All models support quad-processor and octo-processor configurations
- Die size: 226 mm²
- Steppings: A0, B1, C0

Model number	sSpec number	Frequency	L2 cache	L3 cache	Front side bus	Multiplier	Voltage	TDP	Socket	Release date	Part number(s)	Release price (USD)
Xeon MP 1.5	SL6GZ (A0); SL6KB (A0)	1.5 GHz	512 KB	1024 KB	400 MT/s	15×	1.475 V	48 W	Socket 603	November 4, 2002	RN80532KC0211M BX80532KC1500E	$1177
Xeon MP 1.9	SL6H2 (A0); SL6KC (A0)	1.9 GHz	512 KB	1024 KB	400 MT/s	19×	1.475 V	55 W	Socket 603	November 4, 2002	RN80532KC0371M BX80532KC1900E	$1980
Xeon MP 2.0	SL6YJ (B1); SL6Z6 (B1)	2.0 GHz	512 KB	1024 KB	400 MT/s	20×	1.475 V	57 W	Socket 603	June 30, 2003	RN80532KC0411M BX80532KC2000E	$856
Xeon MP 2.0	SL66Z (A0); SL6KD (A0)	2.0 GHz	512 KB	2048 KB	400 MT/s	20×	1.475 V	57 W	Socket 603	November 4, 2002	RN80532KC0412M BX80532KC2000F	$3692
Xeon MP 2.2	SL7A5 (C0)	2.2 GHz	512 KB	2048 KB	400 MT/s	22×	1.475 V	65 W	Socket 603	March 2, 2004	RN80532KC0492M BX80532KC2200F	$1177
Xeon MP 2.5	SL6Z2 (B1); SL6Z7 (B1)	2.5 GHz	512 KB	1024 KB	400 MT/s	25×	1.475 V	66 W	Socket 603	June 30, 2003	RN80532KC0601M BX80532KC2500E	$1980
Xeon MP 2.7	SL79Z (C0)	2.7 GHz	512 KB	2048 KB	400 MT/s	27×	1.475 V	80 W	Socket 603	March 2, 2004	RN80532KC0682M BX80532KC2700F	$1980
Xeon MP 2.8	SL6YL (B1); SL6Z8 (B1)	2.8 GHz	512 KB	2048 KB	400 MT/s	28×	1.475 V	72 W	Socket 603	June 30, 2003	RN80532KC0722M BX80532KC2800F	$3692
Xeon MP 3.0	SL79V (C0)	3.0 GHz	512 KB	4096 KB	400 MT/s	30×	1.5 V	85 W	Socket 603	March 2, 2004	RN80532KC0804M BX80532KC3000H	$3692

=== "Cranford" (90 nm) ===
- Based on NetBurst microarchitecture
- All models support: MMX, SSE, SSE2, SSE3, Hyper-Threading, Intel 64, XD bit (an NX bit implementation)
- All models support quad-processor and octo-processor configurations
- Die size: 236 mm²
- Steppings: A0, B0

Model number	sSpec number	Frequency	L2 cache	Front side bus	Mult	Voltage	TDP	Socket	Release date	Part number(s)	Release price (USD)
Xeon MP 3.16	SL84U (A0); SL8UM (B0)	3.16 GHz	1024 KB	667 MT/s	19×	1.2875V-1.4V	110 W	Socket 604	March 29, 2005	RK80546KF0871M	$722
Xeon MP 3.66	SL84W (A0); SL8UN (B0)	3.67 GHz	1024 KB	667 MT/s	22×	1.2875V-1.4V	110 W	Socket 604	March 29, 2005	RK80546KF1071M	$963

=== "Potomac" (90 nm) ===
- Based on NetBurst microarchitecture
- All models support: MMX, SSE, SSE2, SSE3, Hyper-Threading, Intel 64, XD bit (an NX bit implementation)
- All models support quad-processor and octo-processor configurations
- Die size: 236 mm²
- Steppings: C0

Model number	sSpec number	Frequency	L2 cache	L3 cache	Front side bus	Mult	Voltage	TDP	Socket	Release date	Part number(s)	Release price (USD)
Xeon MP 2.83	SL8ED (C0)	2.83 GHz	1024 KB	4096 KB	667 MT/s	17×	1.25–1.4 V	129 W	Socket 604	March 29, 2005	RK80546KF0734M	$1177
Xeon MP 3.0	SL8EW (C0)	3.0 GHz	1024 KB	8192 KB	667 MT/s	18×	1.25–1.4 V	129 W	Socket 604	March 29, 2005	RK80546KF0808M	$1980
Xeon MP 3.33	SL8EY (C0)	3.33 GHz	1024 KB	8192 KB	667 MT/s	20×	1.25–1.4 V	129 W	Socket 604	March 29, 2005	RK80546KF0938M	$3692

=== "Paxville MP" (90 nm) ===
- Based on NetBurst microarchitecture
- All models support: MMX, SSE, SSE2, SSE3, Hyper-Threading, Intel 64, XD bit (an NX bit implementation), Intel VT-x
- Demand Based Switching (Intel's Server EIST): All except 7030.
- All models support quad-processor and octo-processor configurations
- Die size: 206 mm²
- Steppings: A0

Model number	sSpec number	Frequency	L2 cache	Front side bus	Mult	Voltage	TDP	Socket	Release date	Part number(s)	Release price (USD)
Xeon 7020	SL8UA (A0)	2.67 GHz	2× 1024 KB	667 MT/s	16×	1.2625–1.4125 V	165 W	Socket 604	November 1, 2005	NE80560KF0672MH	$1177
Xeon 7030	SL8UB (A0)	2.8 GHz	2× 1024 KB	800 MT/s	14×	1.2625–1.4125 V	165 W	Socket 604	November 1, 2005	NE80560KG0722MH	$1980
Xeon 7040	SL8UC (A0)	3.0 GHz	2× 2048 KB	667 MT/s	18×	1.2625–1.4125 V	165 W	Socket 604	November 1, 2005	NE80560KF0804MH	$3157
Xeon 7041	SL8UD (A0)	3.0 GHz	2× 2048 KB	800 MT/s	15×	1.2625–1.4125 V	165 W	Socket 604	November 1, 2005	NE80560KG0804MH	$3157

=== "Tulsa" (65 nm) ===
Intel Xeon 7130M Die-shot (Tulsa)

- Based on NetBurst microarchitecture
- All models support: MMX, SSE, SSE2, SSE3, Hyper-Threading, Intel 64, XD bit (an NX bit implementation), Intel VT-x
- All models support quad-processor and octo-processor configurations
- Demand Based Switching (Intel's Server EIST): Supported by: All except 7110M/N & 7120M/N.
- N models feature a 667 MT/s FSB while M models feature an 800 MT/s FSB
- Die size: 435 mm²
- Steppings: B0

Model number	sSpec number	Frequency	L2 cache	L3 cache	Front side bus	Mult	Voltage	TDP	Socket	Release date	Part number(s)	Release price (USD)
Xeon 7110N	SL9QA (B0)	2.5 GHz	2× 1024 KB	4096 KB	667 MT/s	15×	1.1–1.35 V	95 W	Socket 604	August 27, 2006	LF80550KF0604M	$856
Xeon 7110M	SL9Q9 (B0)	2.6 GHz	2× 1024 KB	4096 KB	800 MT/s	13×	1.1–1.35 V	95 W	Socket 604	August 27, 2006	LF80550KG0644M	$856
Xeon 7120N	SL9HF (B0)	3.0 GHz	2× 1024 KB	4096 KB	667 MT/s	18×	1.1–1.35 V	95 W	Socket 604	August 27, 2006	LF80550KF0804M	$1177
Xeon 7120M	SL9HC (B0)	3.0 GHz	2× 1024 KB	4096 KB	800 MT/s	15x	1.1–1.35 V	95 W	Socket 604	August 27, 2006	LF80550KG0804M	$1177
Xeon 7130N	SL9HE (B0)	3.16 GHz	2× 1024 KB	8192 KB	667 MT/s	19×	1.1–1.35 V	150 W	Socket 604	August 27, 2006	LF80550KF0878M	$1391
Xeon 7130M	SL9HB (B0)	3.2 GHz	2× 1024 KB	8192 KB	800 MT/s	16×	1.1–1.35 V	150 W	Socket 604	August 27, 2006	LF80550KG0888M	$1391
Xeon 7140N	SL9HD (B0)	3.33 GHz	2× 1024 KB	16384 KB	667 MT/s	20×	1.1–1.35 V	150 W	Socket 604	August 27, 2006	LF80550KF093007	$1980
Xeon 7140M	SL9HA (B0)	3.4 GHz	2× 1024 KB	16384 KB	800 MT/s	17×	1.1–1.35 V	150 W	Socket 604	August 27, 2006	LF80550KG096007	$1980
Xeon 7150N	SL9YR (B0)	3.5 GHz	2× 1024 KB	16384 KB	667 MT/s	21×	1.1–1.35 V	150 W	Socket 604	Q1 2007	LF80550KF100007	$2622
