= List of Intel Xeon processors (Yonah-based) =

List of Intel Xeon processors (Yonah-based) summarizes the Yonah-generation Intel Xeon lineup of central processing units. It covers the dual-core Xeon DP family (code-named "Sossaman") manufactured using a 65 nanometer process and derived from the Enhanced Pentium M microarchitecture.

== Xeon DP, dual core ==
=== "Sossaman" (65 nm) ===
- Based on Enhanced Pentium M microarchitecture
- All models support: MMX, SSE, SSE2, SSE3, Demand Based Switching (Intel's Server EIST), XD bit (an NX bit implementation), Intel VT-x
- All models support dual-processor configurations
- Die size: 90.3 mm^{2}
- Steppings: C0, D0

| Model number | Frequency | L2 cache | FSB | Mult. | Voltage | TDP | Socket | Release date | Release price (USD) |
|---|---|---|---|---|---|---|---|---|---|
| Xeon LV 1.66 | 1.67 GHz | 2 MB | 667 MT/s | 10× | 1.1125–1.275 V | 31 W | Socket M | March 14, 2006 | $209 |
| Xeon LV 2.0 | 2 GHz | 2 MB | 667 MT/s | 12× | 1.1125–1.275 V | 31 W | Socket M | March 14, 2006 | $423 |
| Xeon LV 2.16 | 2.17 GHz | 2 MB | 667 MT/s | 13× | 1.1125–1.275 V | 31 W | Socket M | Q3 2006 | OEM |
| Xeon ULV 1.66 | 1.67 GHz | 2 MB | 667 MT/s | 10× | 0.8250–1.2125 V | 15 W | Socket M | March 14, 2006 | OEM |

== Sources ==
- "Legacy Intel® Xeon® Processors Product Specifications". ark.intel.com.
- "Intel Yonah hidden features exposed". HEXUS.net.
