= Cooper Lake (microprocessor) =

Intel microprocessor family, released in 2020

General information
- Launched: June 18, 2020; 6 years ago
- Marketed by: Intel
- Designed by: Intel
- Common manufacturer: Intel
- Product code: 80706

Performance
- Max. CPU clock rate: 4.3

Physical specifications
- Cores: 16-28
- Socket: LGA 4189

Cache
- L1 cache: 64 KB per core (32 instructions + 32 data)
- L2 cache: 1 MB per core
- L3 cache: Up to 38.5 MB (1.375 MB/core)

Architecture and classification
- Application: 4S and 8S servers
- Technology node: 14 nm (Tri-Gate) transistors
- Microarchitecture: Skylake
- Instruction set: x86-64
- Instructions: MMX, SSE, SSE2, SSE3, SSSE3, SSE4.1, SSE4.2, AVX, AVX2, FMA3, AVX-512, bfloat16
- Extensions: AES-NI, CLMUL, RDRAND, TXT, FSGSBASE, MOVBE, F16C, BMI, BMI2, RDSEED, ADCX, PREFETCHW, CLFLUSHOPT, XSAVE, MPX, TSX, VT-x, VT-d

Products, models, variants
- Product code name: CPL
- Model: Cooper Lake-SP
- Brand name: Xeon

History
- Predecessor: Cascade Lake
- Successors: Same generation: Ice Lake (10nm, For 1S and 2S systems); Next generation: Sapphire Rapids

Support status
- Supported

Cooper Lake is Intel's codename for the third-generation of their Xeon Scalable processors, developed as the successor to Cascade Lake-SP. Cooper Lake processors are targeted at the 4S and 8S segments of the server market; Ice Lake-SP serves the 1S and 2S segment.

== Features ==
Cooper Lake was launched on June 18, 2020 and features up to 28 cores. Aside from a few microarchitectural changes, Cooper Lake's microarchitecture is mostly identical to Skylake. Cooper Lake features faster memory support (DDR4-3200 over DDR4-2933), support for second-generation Optane memory, and double the UPI links over Cascade Lake. Cooper Lake is the first x86 CPU to support the new bfloat16 instruction set as a part of Intel's Deep Learning Boost (DPL).

=== Improvements ===
- New bfloat16 instruction
- Support for up to 12 DIMMs of DDR4 memory per CPU socket
- Xeon Platinum supports up to eight sockets; Xeon Gold supports up to four sockets; Xeon Silver and Bronze support up to two sockets
- -H: up to 1.12TB DDR4 per socket
- -HL: Large DDR memory tier support (up to 4.5TB)

== List of Cooper Lake processors ==
=== Xeon Platinum (octa processor) ===
Model number	sSpec number	Cores (threads)	Frequency	Turbo Boost all-core/2.0 (/max. 3.0)	L2 cache	L3 cache	TDP	Socket	I/O bus	Memory	Release date	Part number(s)	Release price (USD)
Xeon Platinum 8380HL	SRJXR (A1)	28 (56)	2.9 GHz	?/4.3 GHz	28 × 1 MB	38.5 MB	250 W	LGA 4189	6× 10.4 GT/s UPI	6× DDR4-3200	18 June 2020	CD8070604480401	$13,012
Xeon Platinum 8380H	SRJXQ (A1)	28 (56)	2.9 GHz	?/4.3 GHz	28 × 1 MB	38.5 MB	250 W	LGA 4189	6× 10.4 GT/s UPI	6× DDR4-3200	18 June 2020	CD8070604480301	$10,009
Xeon Platinum 8376HL	SRJXT (A1)	28 (56)	2.6 GHz	?/4.3 GHz	28 × 1 MB	38.5 MB	205 W	LGA 4189	6× 10.4 GT/s UPI	6× DDR4-3200	18 June 2020	CD8070604480601	$11,722
Xeon Platinum 8376H	SRJXS (A1)	28 (56)	2.6 GHz	?/4.3 GHz	28 × 1 MB	38.5 MB	205 W	LGA 4189	6× 10.4 GT/s UPI	6× DDR4-3200	18 June 2020	CD8070604480501	$8719
Xeon Platinum 8360HL	SRK58 (A1)	24 (48)	3 GHz	?/4.2 GHz	24 × 1 MB	33 MB	225 W	LGA 4189	6× 10.4 GT/s UPI	6× DDR4-3200	1 September 2020	CD8070604559801	$7203
Xeon Platinum 8360H	SRK59 (A1)	24 (48)	3 GHz	?/4.2 GHz	24 × 1 MB	33 MB	225 W	LGA 4189	6× 10.4 GT/s UPI	6× DDR4-3200	1 September 2020	CD8070604559900	$4200
Xeon Platinum 8356H	SRK57 (A1)	8 (16)	3.9 GHz	?/4.4 GHz	8 × 1 MB	35.75 MB	190 W	LGA 4189	6× 10.4 GT/s UPI	6× DDR4-2933	1 September 2020	CD8070604559701	$3400
Xeon Platinum 8354H	SRK5Y (A1)	18 (36)	3.1 GHz	?/4.3 GHz	18 × 1 MB	24.75 MB	205 W	LGA 4189	6× 10.4 GT/s UPI	6× DDR4-3200	18 June 2020	CD8070604481002	$3500
Xeon Platinum 8353H	SRJY2 (A1)	18 (36)	2.5 GHz	?/3.8 GHz	18 × 1 MB	24.75 MB	150 W	LGA 4189	6× 10.4 GT/s UPI	6× DDR4-3200	18 June 2020	CD8070604481601	$3003

=== Xeon Gold (quad processor) ===
Model number	sSpec number	Cores (threads)	Frequency	Turbo Boost all-core/2.0 (/max. 3.0)	L2 cache	L3 cache	TDP	Socket	I/O bus	Memory	Release date	Part number(s)	Release price (USD)
Xeon Gold 6348H	SRJXX (A1)	24 (48)	2.3 GHz	?/4.2 GHz	24 × 1 MB	33 MB	165 W	LGA 4189	6× 10.4 GT/s UPI	6× DDR4-2933	18 June 2020	CD8070604481101	$2700
Xeon Gold 6330H	SRK5A (A1)	24 (48)	2 GHz	?/3.7 GHz	24 × 1 MB	33 MB	150 W	LGA 4189	6× 10.4 GT/s UPI	6× DDR4-2933	1 September 2020	CD8070604560002	$1894
Xeon Gold 6328HL	SRJXZ (A1)	16 (32)	2.8 GHz	?/4.3 GHz	16 × 1 MB	22 MB	165 W	LGA 4189	6× 10.4 GT/s UPI	6× DDR4-2933	18 June 2020	CD8070604481301	$4779
Xeon Gold 6328H	SRJXY (A1)	16 (32)	2.8 GHz	?/4.3 GHz	16 × 1 MB	22 MB	165 W	LGA 4189	6× 10.4 GT/s UPI	6× DDR4-2933	18 June 2020	CD8070604481201	$1776
Xeon Gold 5320H	SRJY1 (A1)	20 (40)	2.4 GHz	?/4.2 GHz	20 × 1 MB	27.5 MB	150 W	LGA 4189	6× 10.4 GT/s UPI	6× DDR4-2666	18 June 2020	CD8070604481501	$1555
Xeon Gold 5318H	SRJY3 (A1)	18 (36)	2.5 GHz	?/3.8 GHz	18 × 1 MB	24.75 MB	150 W	LGA 4189	6× 10.4 GT/s UPI	6× DDR4-2666	18 June 2020	CD8070604481600	$1273

Atom (ULV)		Node name	Pentium/Core						
Microarch.	Step	Node name	Microarch.	Step					
		600 nm	P6	Pentium Pro (133 MHz)					
		500 nm	P6	Pentium Pro (150 MHz)					
		350 nm	P6	Pentium Pro (166–200 MHz)					
		350 nm	P6	Klamath					
		250 nm	P6	Deschutes					
		250 nm	P6	Katmai	NetBurst				
		180 nm	P6	Coppermine	Willamette				
		130 nm	P6	Tualatin	Northwood				
		130 nm	Pentium M	Banias	Northwood		NetBurst(HT)		NetBurst(×2)
		90 nm	Pentium M	Dothan	Prescott	⇨	Prescott‑2M	⇨	Smithfield
		90 nm	Pentium M	Dothan	~~Tejas~~	→	⇩	→	~~Cedarmill (Tejas)~~
		65 nm	Pentium M	Yonah	~~Nehalem (NetBurst)~~		Cedar Mill	⇨	Presler
		65 nm	Core	Merom	4 cores on mainstream desktop, DDR3 introduced				
Bonnell	Bonnell	45 nm	Core	Penryn					
Bonnell	Bonnell	45 nm	Nehalem	Nehalem	HT reintroduced, integrated MC, PCH; L3-cache introduced, 256 KB L2-cache/core				
Bonnell	Saltwell	32 nm	Nehalem	Westmere	Introduced GPU on same package and AES-NI				
Bonnell	Saltwell	32 nm	Sandy Bridge	Sandy Bridge	On-die ring bus, no more non-UEFI motherboards				
Silvermont	Silvermont	22 nm	Sandy Bridge	Ivy Bridge					
Silvermont	Silvermont	22 nm	Haswell	Haswell	Fully integrated voltage regulator				
Silvermont	Airmont	14 nm	Haswell	Broadwell					
Silvermont	Airmont	14 nm	Skylake	Skylake	DDR4 introduced on mainstream desktop				
Goldmont		14 nm	Skylake	Kaby Lake					
Goldmont		14 nm	Skylake	Coffee Lake	6 cores on mainstream desktop				
Goldmont		14 nm	Skylake	Amber Lake	Mobile-only				
Goldmont Plus		14 nm	Skylake	Whiskey Lake	Mobile-only				
Goldmont Plus		14 nm	Skylake	Coffee Lake Refresh	8 cores on mainstream desktop				
Goldmont Plus		14 nm	Skylake	Comet Lake	10 cores on mainstream desktop				
Goldmont Plus		14 nm	Sunny Cove	Cypress Cove (Rocket Lake)	Backported Sunny Cove microarchitecture for 14 nm				
Tremont		10 nm	Skylake	Palm Cove (Cannon Lake)	Mobile-only				
Tremont		10 nm	Sunny Cove	Sunny Cove (Ice Lake)	512 KB L2-cache/core				
Tremont		10 nm	Sunny Cove	Willow Cove (Tiger Lake)	X^{e} graphics engine				
Gracemont		Intel 7 (10 nm ESF)	Golden Cove	Golden Cove (Alder Lake)	Hybrid, DDR5, PCIe 5.0				
Gracemont		Intel 7 (10 nm ESF)	Golden Cove	Raptor Cove (Raptor Lake)					
Crestmont		Intel 4	Redwood Cove	Meteor Lake	Mobile-only; NPU, chiplet architecture				
Crestmont		Intel 3	Redwood Cove	Arrow Lake-U					
Skymont		TSMC N3B	Lion Cove	Lunar Lake	Low power mobile only (9–30 W)				
Skymont		TSMC N3B	Lion Cove	Arrow Lake					
Darkmont		Intel 18A	Cougar Cove	Panther Lake					
Arctic Wolf		Intel 18A and/or TSMC N2P	Coyote Cove	Nova Lake					
