= Intel X299 =

Intel chipset

- Codename(s): Basin Falls
- CPU supported: Intel Core (Skylake-X); Intel Core (Kaby Lake-X); Intel Core (Cascade Lake-X)
- Socket supported: LGA 2066
- Fabrication process: 22 nm
- TDP: 6 W

Miscellaneous
- Release date(s): June 2017
- Predecessor: Intel X99
- Successor: Intel C621A

Intel X299, codenamed "Basin Falls", is a Platform Controller Hub (PCH) designed and manufactured by Intel, targeted at the high-end desktop (HEDT) or enthusiast segment of the Intel product lineup. The X299 chipset supports the Intel Core X-series processors, which are codenamed Skylake-X, Kaby Lake-X and Cascade Lake-X. All supported processors use the LGA 2066 socket. The X299 chipset was released in June 2017, with the Intel Core i9-7900X.

== See also ==
- List of Intel chipsets

== Features ==
The X299 chipset uses the new Direct Media Interface (DMI) 3.0. 24 PCI Express 3.0 lanes are provided by the chipset, a sizable increase from the X99 chipset's 8 PCI-e 2.0 lanes.

Many features from the X99 chipset are carried over to the X299 chipset.

These include:

- M.2
- USB 3.0 and 2.0 support
- Flexible I/O
- VT-d support
- SATA Express
- Overclocking
