= List of Intel Xeon processors (Cascade Lake–based) =

== "Cascade Lake-SP" (14 nm) Scalable Performance ==
- Support for up to 12 DIMMs of DDR4 memory per CPU socket
- Xeon Platinum supports up to eight sockets; Xeon Gold supports up to four sockets; Xeon Silver and Bronze support up to two sockets
- No suffix letter: up to 1.0TB DDR4 per socket
- -L: Large DDR memory tier support (up to 4.5TB)
- -M: Medium DDR memory tier support (up to 2.0TB)
- -N: Network & NFV specialized
- -R: Refresh (higher performance)
- -S: Search value specialized
- -T: High thermal-case and extended reliability
- -U: Uniprocessor
- -V: VM density value specialized
- -Y: Speed select

=== Xeon Gold (uniprocessor) ===
Model number	sSpec number	Cores (threads)	Frequency	Turbo Boost all-core/2.0)	L2 cache	L3 cache	TDP	Socket	I/O bus	Memory	Release date	Part number(s)	Release price (USD)
Xeon Gold 6208U	SRGZD (B1)	16 (32)	2.9 GHz	2.6/3.9 GHz	16 × 1 MB	22 MB	150 W	LGA 3647	DMI 3.0	6× DDR4-2933	February 2020	CD8069504449101	$989
Xeon Gold 6209U	SRFQ3 (B1)	20 (40)	2.1 GHz	2.8/3.9 GHz	20 × 1 MB	27.5 MB	125 W	LGA 3647	DMI 3.0	6× DDR4-2933	May 2019	CD8069504284804	$1350
Xeon Gold 6210U	SRF9B (B1)	20 (40)	2.5 GHz	3.2/3.9 GHz	20 × 1 MB	27.5 MB	150 W	LGA 3647	DMI 3.0	6× DDR4-2933	2 April 2019	CD8069504198101	$1500
Xeon Gold 6212U	SRF9A (B1)	24 (48)	2.4 GHz	3.1/3.9 GHz	24 × 1 MB	36 MB	165 W	LGA 3647	DMI 3.0	6× DDR4-2933	2 April 2019	CD8069504198002	$2000

=== Xeon Bronze and Silver (dual processor) ===
Model number	sSpec number	Cores (threads)	Frequency	Turbo Boost all-core/2.0)	L2 cache	L3 cache	TDP	Socket	I/O bus	Memory	Release date	Part number(s)	Release price (USD)
Xeon Bronze 3204	SRFBP (R1)	6 (6)	1.9 GHz	—N/a	6 × 1 MB	8.25 MB	85 W	LGA 3647	2× 9.6 GT/s UPI	6× DDR4-2133	2 April 2019	CD8069503956700; BX806953204	$213
Xeon Bronze 3206R	SRG25 (R1)	8 (8)	1.9 GHz	—N/a	8 × 1 MB	11 MB	85 W	LGA 3647	2× 9.6 GT/s UPI	6× DDR4-2133	24 February 2020	CD8069504344600; BX806953206R	$306
Xeon Silver 4208	SRFBM (R1)	8 (16)	2.1 GHz	2.5/3.2 GHz	8 × 1 MB	11 MB	85 W	LGA 3647	2× 9.6 GT/s UPI	6× DDR4-2400	2 April 2019	CD8069503956401; BX806954208	$417
Xeon Silver 4209T	SRFBQ (R1)	8 (16)	2.2 GHz	2.5/3.2 GHz	8 × 1 MB	11 MB	70 W	LGA 3647	2× 9.6 GT/s UPI	6× DDR4-2400	2 April 2019	CD8069503956900	$501
Xeon Silver 4210	SRFBL (R1)	10 (20)	2.2 GHz	2.7/3.2 GHz	10 × 1 MB	13.75 MB	85 W	LGA 3647	2× 9.6 GT/s UPI	6× DDR4-2400	2 April 2019	CD8069503956302; BX806954210	$501
Xeon Silver 4210R	SRG24 (R1)	10 (20)	2.4 GHz	2.9/3.2 GHz	10 × 1 MB	13.75 MB	100 W	LGA 3647	2× 9.6 GT/s UPI	6× DDR4-2400	24 February 2020	CD8069504344500; BX806954210R	$501
Xeon Silver 4210T	SRGYH (R1)	10 (20)	2.3 GHz	2.8/3.2 GHz	10 × 1 MB	13.75 MB	95 W	LGA 3647	2× 9.6 GT/s UPI	6× DDR4-2400	24 February 2020	CD8069504444900	$555
Xeon Silver 4211W		12 (24)	2.5 GHz	3.0/4.0 GHz	12 × 1 MB	16.5 MB	100 W	LGA 3647	2× 9.6 GT/s UPI	6× DDR4-2400			OEM
Xeon Silver 4213W		8 (16)	3 GHz	3.6/4.0 GHz	8 × 1 MB	11 MB	115 W	LGA 3647	2× 9.6 GT/s UPI	6× DDR4-2400			OEM
Xeon Silver 4214	SRFB9 (L1)	12 (24)	2.2 GHz	2.7/3.2 GHz	12 × 1 MB	16.5 MB	85 W	LGA 3647	2× 9.6 GT/s UPI	6× DDR4-2400	2 April 2019	CD8069504212601; BX806954214	$694
Xeon Silver 4214R	SRG1W (L1)	12 (24)	2.4 GHz	3.0/3.5 GHz	12 × 1 MB	16.5 MB	100 W	LGA 3647	2× 9.6 GT/s UPI	6× DDR4-2400	24 February 2020	CD8069504343701; BX806954214R	$694
Xeon Silver 4214Y	SRFDG (L1)	12 (24)	2.2 GHz	2.7/3.2 GHz	12 × 1 MB	16.5 MB	85 W	LGA 3647	2× 9.6 GT/s UPI	6× DDR4-2400	2 April 2019	CD8069504294401	$768
Xeon Silver 4215	SRFBA (L1)	8 (16)	2.5 GHz	3.0/3.5 GHz	8 × 1 MB	11 MB	85 W	LGA 3647	2× 9.6 GT/s UPI	6× DDR4-2400	2 April 2019	CD8069504212701	$794
Xeon Silver 4215R	SRGZE (B1)	8 (16)	3.2 GHz	3.6/4.0 GHz	8 × 1 MB	11 MB	130 W	LGA 3647	2× 9.6 GT/s UPI	6× DDR4-2400	24 February 2020	CD8069504449200	$794
Xeon Silver 4216	SRFBB (L1)	16 (32)	2.1 GHz	2.7/3.2 GHz	16 × 1 MB	22 MB	100 W	LGA 3647	2× 9.6 GT/s UPI	6× DDR4-2400	2 April 2019	CD8069504213901; BX806954216	$1002
Xeon Silver 4216R		16 (32)	2.2 GHz	3.0/3.7 GHz	16 × 1 MB	22 MB	125 W	LGA 3647	2× 9.6 GT/s UPI	6× DDR4-2400			OEM

=== Xeon Gold (dual processor) ===
Model number	sSpec number	Cores (threads)	Frequency	Turbo Boost all-core/2.0)	L2 cache	L3 cache	TDP	Socket	I/O bus	Memory	Release date	Part number(s)	Release price (USD)
Xeon Gold 5215	SRFBC (B1)	10 (20)	2.5 GHz	2.5/3.4 GHz	10 × 1 MB	13.75 MB	85 W	LGA 3647	2× 10.4 GT/s UPI	6× DDR4-2666	Q2 2019	CD8069504214002	$1221
Xeon Gold 5218R	SRGZ7 (B1)	20 (40)	2.1 GHz	2.8/4.0 GHz	20 × 1 MB	27.5 MB	125 W	LGA 3647	2× 10.4 GT/s UPI	6× DDR4-2666	24 February 2020	CD8069504446300; BX806955218R	$1273
Xeon Gold 5219Y	SRF8C (B1)	16 (32)	2.4 GHz	2.7/4.0 GHz	16 × 1 MB	22 MB	125 W	LGA 3647	2× 10.4 GT/s UPI	6× DDR4-2666	Q2 2019	CD8069504184202	
Xeon Gold 5220R	SRGZP (B1)	24 (48)	2.2 GHz	2.4/4.0 GHz	24 × 1 MB	35.75 MB	150 W	LGA 3647	2× 10.4 GT/s UPI	6× DDR4-2666	24 February 2020	CD8069504451301; BX806955220R	$1555
Xeon Gold 6222	SRF8D (B1)	20 (40)	1.8 GHz	2.2/3.6 GHz	20 × 1 MB	27.5 MB	115 W	LGA 3647	2× 10.4 GT/s UPI	6× DDR4-2400	Q2 2019	CD8069504184502	$1600
Xeon Gold 6226R	SRGZC (B1)	16 (32)	2.9 GHz	3.6/3.9 GHz	16 × 1 MB	22 MB	150 W	LGA 3647	2× 10.4 GT/s UPI	6× DDR4-2933	24 February 2020	CD8069504449000; BX806956226R	$1300
Xeon Gold 6230R	SRGZA (B1)	26 (52)	2.1 GHz	2.3/4.0 GHz	26 × 1 MB	35.75 MB	150 W	LGA 3647	2× 10.4 GT/s UPI	6× DDR4-2933	24 February 2020	CD8069504448800; BX806956230R	$1894
Xeon Gold 6238R	SRGZ9 (B1)	28 (56)	2.2 GHz	2.4/4.0 GHz	28 × 1 MB	38.5 MB	165 W	LGA 3647	2× 10.4 GT/s UPI	6× DDR4-2933	24 February 2020	CD8069504448701; BX806956238R	$2612
Xeon Gold 6240R	SRGZ8 (B1)	24 (48)	2.4 GHz	3.2/4.0 GHz	24 × 1 MB	35.75 MB	165 W	LGA 3647	2× 10.4 GT/s UPI	6× DDR4-2933	24 February 2020	CD8069504448600; BX806956240R	$2200
Xeon Gold 6242R	SRGZJ (B1)	20 (40)	3.1 GHz	3.3/4.1 GHz	20 × 1 MB	35.75 MB	205 W	LGA 3647	2× 10.4 GT/s UPI	6× DDR4-2933	24 February 2020	CD8069504449601	$2529
Xeon Gold 6246R	SRGZL (B1)	16 (32)	3.4 GHz	3.6/4.1 GHz	16 × 1 MB	35.75 MB	205 W	LGA 3647	2× 10.4 GT/s UPI	6× DDR4-2933	24 February 2020	CD8069504449801	$3286
Xeon Gold 6248R	SRGZG (B1)	24 (48)	3 GHz	3.6/4.0 GHz	24 × 1 MB	35.75 MB	205 W	LGA 3647	2× 10.4 GT/s UPI	6× DDR4-2933	24 February 2020	CD8069504449401	$2700
Xeon Gold 6258R	SRGZF (B1)	28 (56)	2.7 GHz	2.7/4.0 GHz	28 × 1 MB	38.5 MB	205 W	LGA 3647	2× 10.4 GT/s UPI	6× DDR4-2933	24 February 2020	CD8069504449301	$3950
Xeon Gold 6262	SRF8E (B1)	24 (48)	1.9 GHz	2.4/3.6 GHz	24 × 1 MB	33 MB	135 W	LGA 3647	2× 10.4 GT/s UPI	6× DDR4-2400	Q2 2019	CD8069504184602	$2900
Xeon Gold 6269Y	SRF8B (B1)	22 (44)	3.2 GHz	3.4/3.7 GHz	22 × 1 MB	30.25 MB	240 W	LGA 3647	2× 10.4 GT/s UPI	6× DDR4-2666	Q2 2019	CD8069504184102	
Xeon Gold 6290	SRG30 (B1)	22 (44)	3.2 GHz	3.6/3.9 GHz	22 × 1 MB	30.25 MB	240 W	LGA 3647	2× 10.4 GT/s UPI	6× DDR4-2666	Q2 2019		OEM

=== Xeon Gold (quad processor) ===
Model number	sSpec number	Cores (threads)	Frequency	Turbo Boost all-core/2.0)	L2 cache	L3 cache	TDP	Socket	I/O bus	Memory	Release date	Part number(s)	Release price (USD)
Xeon Gold 5213W		10 (20)	2.7 GHz	3.3/4.3 GHz	10 × 1 MB	13.75 MB	100 W	LGA 3647	2× 10.4 GT/s UPI	6× DDR4-2666			OEM
Xeon Gold 5215	SRFBC (L1)	10 (20)	2.5 GHz	3.0/3.4 GHz	10 × 1 MB	13.75 MB	85 W	LGA 3647	2× 10.4 GT/s UPI	6× DDR4-2666	2 April 2019	CD8069504214002	$1221
Xeon Gold 5215L	SRFBE (L1)	10 (20)	2.5 GHz	3.0/3.4 GHz	10 × 1 MB	13.75 MB	85 W	LGA 3647	2× 10.4 GT/s UPI	6× DDR4-2666	2 April 2019	CD8069504214202	$9119
Xeon Gold 5215M	SRFBD (L1)	10 (20)	2.5 GHz	3.0/3.4 GHz	10 × 1 MB	13.75 MB	85 W	LGA 3647	2× 10.4 GT/s UPI	6× DDR4-2666	2 April 2019	CD8069504214102	$4224
Xeon Gold 5216W		8 (16)	3.5 GHz	3.8/4.2 GHz	8 × 1 MB	16.5 MB	160 W	LGA 3647	2× 10.4 GT/s UPI	6× DDR4-2666			OEM
Xeon Gold 5217	SRFBF (L1)	8 (16)	3 GHz	3.4/3.7 GHz	8 × 1 MB	11 MB	115 W	LGA 3647	2× 10.4 GT/s UPI	6× DDR4-2666	2 April 2019	CD8069504214302	$1522
Xeon Gold 5218	SRF8T (B1)	16 (32)	2.3 GHz	2.8/3.9 GHz	16 × 1 MB	22 MB	125 W	LGA 3647	2× 10.4 GT/s UPI	6× DDR4-2666	2 April 2019	CD8069504193301; BX806955218	$1273
Xeon Gold 5218B	SRFDJ (L1)	16 (32)	2.3 GHz	2.8/3.9 GHz	16 × 1 MB	22 MB	125 W	LGA 3647	2× 10.4 GT/s UPI	6× DDR4-2666	2 April 2019	CD8069504295701	$1273
Xeon Gold 5218N	SRFD9 (L1); SRGLN (L1)	16 (32)	2.3 GHz	3.0/3.7 GHz	16 × 1 MB	22 MB	125 W 110 W	LGA 3647	2× 10.4 GT/s UPI	6× DDR4-2666	2 April 2019	CD8069504289900; CD8069504384601	$1375
Xeon Gold 5218T	SRFPM (B1)	16 (32)	2.1 GHz	2.7/3.8 GHz	16 × 1 MB	22 MB	105 W	LGA 3647	2× 10.4 GT/s UPI	6× DDR4-2666	May 2019	CD8069504283204	$1349
Xeon Gold 5220	SRFBJ (L1)	18 (36)	2.2 GHz	2.7/3.9 GHz	18 × 1 MB	24.75 MB	125 W	LGA 3647	2× 10.4 GT/s UPI	6× DDR4-2666	2 April 2019	CD8069504214601; BX806955220	$1555
Xeon Gold 5220S	SRFPT (B1)	18 (36)	2.7 GHz	2.7/3.9 GHz	18 × 1 MB	24.75 MB	125 W	LGA 3647	2× 10.4 GT/s UPI	6× DDR4-2666	May 2019	CD8069504283804	$2000
Xeon Gold 5220T	SRFPK (B1)	18 (36)	1.9 GHz	2.7/3.9 GHz	18 × 1 MB	24.75 MB	105 W	LGA 3647	2× 10.4 GT/s UPI	6× DDR4-2666	May 2019	CD8069504283006	$1727
Xeon Gold 5222	SRF8V (B1)	4 (8)	3.8 GHz	3.9/3.9 GHz	4 × 1 MB	16.5 MB	105 W	LGA 3647	2× 10.4 GT/s UPI	6× DDR4-2933	2 April 2019	CD8069504193501	$1221
Xeon Gold 6222V	SRFQ5 (B1)	20 (40)	1.8 GHz	2.4/3.6 GHz	20 × 1 MB	27.5 MB	115 W	LGA 3647	3× 10.4 GT/s UPI	6× DDR4-2400	May 2019	CD8069504285204	$1600
Xeon Gold 6226	SRFPP (B1)	12 (24)	2.7 GHz	3.5/3.7 GHz	12 × 1 MB	19.25 MB	125 W	LGA 3647	3× 10.4 GT/s UPI	6× DDR4-2933	May 2019	CD8069504283404	$1776
Xeon Gold 6230	SRF8W (B1)	20 (40)	2.1 GHz	2.8/3.9 GHz	20 × 1 MB	27.5 MB	125 W	LGA 3647	3× 10.4 GT/s UPI	6× DDR4-2933	2 April 2019	CD8069504193701; BX806956230	$1894
Xeon Gold 6230N	SRFPR (B1)	20 (40)	2.3 GHz	2.9/3.5 GHz	20 × 1 MB	27.5 MB	125 W	LGA 3647	3× 10.4 GT/s UPI	6× DDR4-2933	May 2019	CD8069504283604	$2046
Xeon Gold 6230T	SRFPS (B1)	20 (40)	2.1 GHz	2.8/3.9 GHz	20 × 1 MB	27.5 MB	125 W	LGA 3647	3× 10.4 GT/s UPI	6× DDR4-2933	May 2019	CD8069504283704	$1988
Xeon Gold 6231		16 (32)	3.2 GHz	?/3.9 GHz	16 × 1 MB	22 MB	185 W	LGA 3647	3× 10.4 GT/s UPI	6× DDR4-2933			OEM
Xeon Gold 6231C	SRF8F (B1)	16 (32)	3.2 GHz	3.7/3.9 GHz	16 × 1 MB	22 MB	185 W	LGA 3647	3× 10.4 GT/s UPI	6× DDR4-2933			OEM
Xeon Gold 6233		24 (48)	2.5 GHz	?/3.9 GHz	24 × 1 MB	33 MB	165 W	LGA 3647	3× 10.4 GT/s UPI	6× DDR4-2933			OEM
Xeon Gold 6234	SRFPN (B1)	8 (16)	3.3 GHz	4.0/4.0 GHz	8 × 1 MB	24.75 MB	130 W	LGA 3647	3× 10.4 GT/s UPI	6× DDR4-2933	May 2019	CD8069504283304	$2214
Xeon Gold 6238	SRFPL (B1)	22 (44)	2.1 GHz	2.8/3.7 GHz	22 × 1 MB	30.25 MB	140 W	LGA 3647	3× 10.4 GT/s UPI	6× DDR4-2933	May 2019	CD8069504283104	$2612
Xeon Gold 6238L	SRFQ2 (B1)	22 (44)	2.1 GHz	2.8/3.7 GHz	22 × 1 MB	30.25 MB	140 W	LGA 3647	3× 10.4 GT/s UPI	6× DDR4-2933	May 2019	CD8069504284704	$10,510
Xeon Gold 6238M	SRFQ1 (B1)	22 (44)	2.1 GHz	2.8/3.7 GHz	22 × 1 MB	30.25 MB	140 W	LGA 3647	3× 10.4 GT/s UPI	6× DDR4-2933	May 2019	CD8069504284604	$5615
Xeon Gold 6238T	SRF9C (B1)	22 (44)	1.9 GHz	2.7/3.7 GHz	22 × 1 MB	30.25 MB	125 W	LGA 3647	3× 10.4 GT/s UPI	6× DDR4-2933	2 April 2019	CD8069504200401	$2742
Xeon Gold 6240	SRF8X (B1)	18 (36)	2.6 GHz	3.3/3.9 GHz	18 × 1 MB	24.75 MB	150 W	LGA 3647	3× 10.4 GT/s UPI	6× DDR4-2933	2 April 2019	CD8069504194001; BX806956240	$2445
Xeon Gold 6240L	SRFQ0 (B1)	18 (36)	2.6 GHz	3.3/3.9 GHz	18 × 1 MB	24.75 MB	150 W	LGA 3647	3× 10.4 GT/s UPI	6× DDR4-2933	May 2019	CD8069504284503	$10,243
Xeon Gold 6240M	SRFPZ (B1)	18 (36)	2.6 GHz	3.3/3.9 GHz	18 × 1 MB	24.75 MB	150 W	LGA 3647	3× 10.4 GT/s UPI	6× DDR4-2933	May 2019	CD8069504284403	$5448
Xeon Gold 6240Y	SRF9D (B1)	18 (36)	2.6 GHz	3.3/3.9 GHz	18 × 1 MB	24.75 MB	150 W	LGA 3647	3× 10.4 GT/s UPI	6× DDR4-2933	2 April 2019	CD8069504200501	$2726
Xeon Gold 6240C		18 (36)	2.6 GHz	3.6/3.9 GHz	18 × 1 MB	24.75 MB	150 W	LGA 3647	3× 10.4 GT/s UPI	6× DDR4-2933			OEM
Xeon Gold 6241W	SRF9Y	16 (32)	3.2 GHz	4.2/4.4 GHz	16 × 1 MB	22 MB	205 W	LGA 3647	3× 10.4 GT/s UPI	6× DDR4-2933			OEM
Xeon Gold 6242	SRF8Y (B1)	16 (32)	2.8 GHz	3.5/3.9 GHz	16 × 1 MB	22 MB	150 W	LGA 3647	3× 10.4 GT/s UPI	6× DDR4-2933	2 April 2019	CD8069504194101; BX806956242	$2529
Xeon Gold 6244	SRF8Z (B1)	8 (16)	3.6 GHz	4.3/4.4 GHz	8 × 1 MB	24.75 MB	150 W	LGA 3647	3× 10.4 GT/s UPI	6× DDR4-2933	2 April 2019	CD8069504194202	$2925
Xeon Gold 6245W		12 (24)	3.3 GHz	4.1/4.4 GHz	12 × 1 MB	19.25 MB	180 W	LGA 3647	3× 10.4 GT/s UPI	6× DDR4-2933			OEM
Xeon Gold 6246	SRFPJ (B1)	12 (24)	3.3 GHz	4.1/4.2 GHz	12 × 1 MB	24.75 MB	165 W	LGA 3647	3× 10.4 GT/s UPI	6× DDR4-2933	May 2019	CD8069504282905	$3286
Xeon Gold 6248	SRF90 (B1)	20 (40)	2.5 GHz	3.2/3.9 GHz	20 × 1 MB	27.5 MB	150 W	LGA 3647	3× 10.4 GT/s UPI	6× DDR4-2933	2 April 2019	CD8069504194301; BX806956248	$3072
Xeon Gold 6249C		26 (52)	2.6 GHz	—N/a	26 × 1 MB	35.75 MB		LGA 3647	3× 10.4 GT/s UPI	6× DDR4-2933			OEM
Xeon Gold 6250	SRGTR (B1)	8 (16)	3.9 GHz	4.5/4.5 GHz	8 × 1 MB	35.75 MB	185 W	LGA 3647	3× 10.4 GT/s UPI	6× DDR4-2933	24 February 2020	CD8069504425402	$3400
Xeon Gold 6250L	SRH5D (B1)	8 (16)	3.9 GHz	4.5/4.5 GHz	8 × 1 MB	35.75 MB	185 W	LGA 3647	3× 10.4 GT/s UPI	6× DDR4-2933	24 February 2020	CD8069504497400	$6404
Xeon Gold 6252	SRF91 (B1)	24 (48)	2.1 GHz	2.8/3.7 GHz	24 × 1 MB	35.75 MB	150 W	LGA 3647	3× 10.4 GT/s UPI	6× DDR4-2933	2 April 2019	CD8069504194401; BX806956252	$3655
Xeon Gold 6252N	SRFPQ (B1)	24 (48)	2.3 GHz	3.0/3.6 GHz	24 × 1 MB	35.75 MB	150 W	LGA 3647	3× 10.4 GT/s UPI	6× DDR4-2933	May 2019	CD8069504283503	$4259
Xeon Gold 6253W		18 (36)	3.1 GHz	4.1/4.4 GHz	18 × 1 MB	24.75 MB	200 W	LGA 3647	3× 10.4 GT/s UPI	6× DDR4-2933			OEM
Xeon Gold 6253CL	SRF7Z (B1)	18 (36)	3.1 GHz	3.8/3.9 GHz	18 × 1 MB	24.75 MB	205 W	LGA 3647	3× 10.4 GT/s UPI	6× DDR4-2933			OEM
Xeon Gold 6254	SRF92 (B1)	18 (36)	3.1 GHz	3.9/4.0 GHz	18 × 1 MB	24.75 MB	200 W	LGA 3647	3× 10.4 GT/s UPI	6× DDR4-2933	2 April 2019	CD8069504194501	$3803
Xeon Gold 6256	SRGTQ (B1)	12 (24)	3.6 GHz	4.3/4.5 GHz	12 × 1 MB	33 MB	205 W	LGA 3647	3× 10.4 GT/s UPI	6× DDR4-2933	24 February 2020	CD8069504425301	$3900
Xeon Gold 6261		22 (44)	3 GHz	3.2/3.4 GHz	22 × 1 MB	30.25 MB	205 W	LGA 3647	3× 10.4 GT/s UPI	6× DDR4-2933			OEM
Xeon Gold 6262V	SRFQ4 (B1)	24 (48)	1.9 GHz	2.5/3.6 GHz	24 × 1 MB	33 MB	135 W	LGA 3647	3× 10.4 GT/s UPI	6× DDR4-2400	May 2019	CD8069504285004	$2900
Xeon Gold 6263CY		24 (48)	2.6 GHz	3.7/4.0 GHz	24 × 1 MB	33 MB	205 W	LGA 3647	3× 10.4 GT/s UPI	6× DDR4-2933			OEM
Xeon Gold 6266C	SRF83 (B1)	22 (44)	3 GHz	3.2/3.4 GHz	22 × 1 MB	30.25 MB	205 W	LGA 3647	3× 10.4 GT/s UPI	6× DDR4-2933			OEM
Xeon Gold 6267	SRFQ7	24 (48)	2.6 GHz	3.1/3.4 GHz	24 × 1 MB	33 MB	165 W	LGA 3647	3× 10.4 GT/s UPI	6× DDR4-2933			OEM
Xeon Gold 6267C	SRF87	24 (48)	2.6 GHz	?/3.4 GHz	24 × 1 MB	33 MB	165 W	LGA 3647	3× 10.4 GT/s UPI	6× DDR4-2933			OEM
Xeon Gold 6268CL	SRF80 (B1)	24 (48)	2.8 GHz	3.4/3.9 GHz	24 × 1 MB	33 MB	205 W	LGA 3647	3× 10.4 GT/s UPI	6× DDR4-2933			OEM
Xeon Gold 6271C	SRF8M (B1)	24 (48)	2.6 GHz	3.1/3.9 GHz	24 × 1 MB	33 MB	165 W	LGA 3647	3× 10.4 GT/s UPI	6× DDR4-2933			OEM
Xeon Gold 6273C	SRFQ6 (B1)	26 (52)	2.2 GHz	3.2/3.5 GHz	26 × 1 MB	35.75 MB	165 W	LGA 3647	3× 10.4 GT/s UPI	6× DDR4-2933			OEM
Xeon Gold 6278C	SRF86 (B1)	26 (52)	2.6 GHz	3.3/3.5 GHz	26 × 1 MB	35.75 MB	185 W	LGA 3647	3× 10.4 GT/s UPI	6× DDR4-2933			OEM
Xeon Gold 6290		22 (44)	3.2 GHz	3.6/3.9 GHz	22 × 1 MB	30.25 MB	240 W	LGA 3647	3× 10.4 GT/s UPI	6× DDR4-2933			OEM

=== Xeon Platinum (octa processor) ===
Model number	sSpec number	Cores (threads)	Frequency	Turbo Boost all-core/2.0)	L2 cache	L3 cache	TDP	Socket	I/O bus	Memory	Release date	Part number(s)	Release price (USD)
Xeon Platinum 8222L	SRFA7 (B1)	18 (36)	3 GHz	3.4/3.5 GHz	18 × 1 MB	24.75 MB	200 W	LGA 3647	3× 10.4 GT/s UPI	6× DDR4-2666			OEM
Xeon Platinum 8223CL	SRGTN (B1)	18 (36)	3 GHz	3.4/3.5 GHz	18 × 1 MB	24.75 MB	240 W	LGA 3647	3× 10.4 GT/s UPI	6× DDR4-2666			OEM
Xeon Platinum 8249C	SRFQ9 (B1)	26 (52)	2.1 GHz	2.7/3.6 GHz	26 × 1 MB	35.75 MB	150 W	LGA 3647	3× 10.4 GT/s UPI	6× DDR4-2666			OEM
Xeon Platinum 8251	SRF8R (B1)	12 (24)	3.8 GHz	？/4.2 GHz	12 × 1 MB	24.75 MB	240 W	LGA 3647	3× 10.4 GT/s UPI	6× DDR4-2933			OEM
Xeon Platinum 8252C	SRGTP (B1)	12 (24)	3.8 GHz	4.5/4.5 GHz	12 × 1 MB	24.75 MB	240 W	LGA 3647	3× 10.4 GT/s UPI	6× DDR4-2933			OEM
Xeon Platinum 8253	SRF93 (B1)	16 (32)	2.2 GHz	2.5/3.0 GHz	16 × 1 MB	22 MB	125 W	LGA 3647	3× 10.4 GT/s UPI	6× DDR4-2933	2 April 2019	CD8069504194601	$3115
Xeon Platinum 8255C	SRFQC (B1)	24 (48)	2.5 GHz	？/3.9 GHz	24 × 1 MB	35.75 MB	165 W	LGA 3647	3× 10.4 GT/s UPI	6× DDR4-2933			OEM
Xeon Platinum 8256	SRF94 (B1)	4 (8)	3.8 GHz	3.9/3.9 GHz	4 × 1 MB	16.5 MB	105 W	LGA 3647	3× 10.4 GT/s UPI	6× DDR4-2933	2 April 2019	CD8069504194701; BX806958256	$7007
Xeon Platinum 8259L	SRFA8 (B1)	24 (48)	2.5 GHz	3.1/3.5 GHz	24 × 1 MB	35.75 MB	210 W	LGA 3647	3× 10.4 GT/s UPI	6× DDR4-2666			OEM
Xeon Platinum 8259CL	SRFA8 (B1)	24 (48)	2.5 GHz	3.1/3.5 GHz	24 × 1 MB	35.75 MB	210 W	LGA 3647	3× 10.4 GT/s UPI	6× DDR4-2666			OEM
Xeon Platinum 8260	SRF9H (B1)	24 (48)	2.4 GHz	3.1/3.9 GHz	24 × 1 MB	35.75 MB	165 W	LGA 3647	3× 10.4 GT/s UPI	6× DDR4-2933	2 April 2019	CD8069504201101	$4702
Xeon Platinum 8260L	SRF9G (B1)	24 (48)	2.4 GHz	3.1/3.9 GHz	24 × 1 MB	35.75 MB	165 W	LGA 3647	3× 10.4 GT/s UPI	6× DDR4-2933	2 April 2019	CD8069504201001	$12,599
Xeon Platinum 8260M	SRF9J (B1)	24 (48)	2.4 GHz	3.1/3.9 GHz	24 × 1 MB	35.75 MB	165 W	LGA 3647	3× 10.4 GT/s UPI	6× DDR4-2933	2 April 2019	CD8069504201201	$7705
Xeon Platinum 8260Y	SRF9F (B1)	24 (48)	2.4 GHz	3.1/3.9 GHz	24 × 1 MB	35.75 MB	165 W	LGA 3647	3× 10.4 GT/s UPI	6× DDR4-2933	2 April 2019	CD8069504200902	$5320
Xeon Platinum 8263C	SRFQ8	26 (52)	2.5 GHz	?/3.8 GHz	26 × 1 MB	35.75 MB	165 W	LGA 3647	3× 10.4 GT/s UPI	6× DDR4-2933			OEM
Xeon Platinum 8267W	SRF9N	24 (48)	2.7 GHz	4.2/4.4 GHz	24 × 1 MB	33 MB	205 W	LGA 3647	3× 10.4 GT/s UPI	6× DDR4-2933			OEM
Xeon Platinum 8268	SRF95 (B1)	24 (48)	2.9 GHz	3.5/3.9 GHz	24 × 1 MB	35.75 MB	205 W	LGA 3647	3× 10.4 GT/s UPI	6× DDR4-2933	2 April 2019	CD8069504195101	$6302
Xeon Platinum 8269CY	SRF8J (B1)	26 (52)	2.5 GHz	3.3/3.8 GHz	26 × 1 MB	35.75 MB	205 W	LGA 3647	3× 10.4 GT/s UPI	6× DDR4-2666			OEM
Xeon Platinum 8270	SRF96 (B1)	26 (52)	2.7 GHz	3.4/4.0 GHz	26 × 1 MB	35.75 MB	205 W	LGA 3647	3× 10.4 GT/s UPI	6× DDR4-2933	2 April 2019	CD8069504195201	$7405
Xeon Platinum 8272L	SRF89 (B1)	26 (52)	2.6 GHz	3.4/3.7 GHz	26 × 1 MB	35.75 MB	195 W	LGA 3647	3× 10.4 GT/s UPI	6× DDR4-2666			OEM
Xeon Platinum 8272CL	SRF89 (B1)	26 (52)	2.6 GHz	3.4/3.7 GHz	26 × 1 MB	35.75 MB	195 W	LGA 3647	3× 10.4 GT/s UPI	6× DDR4-2666	Q4 2019	L950G305	OEM (Microsoft)
Xeon Platinum 8273CL	SRF81	28 (56)	2.2 GHz	2.9/3.7 GHz	28 × 1 MB	38.5 MB	165 W	LGA 3647	3× 10.4 GT/s UPI	6× DDR4-2933			OEM
Xeon Platinum 8274	SRFPX (B1)	24 (48)	3.2 GHz	3.2/4.0 GHz	24 × 1 MB	35.75 MB	240 W	LGA 3647	3× 10.4 GT/s UPI	6× DDR4-2933	Q2 2019	CD8069504284203	
Xeon Platinum 8275CL	SRFA9 (B1)	24 (48)	3 GHz	3.6/3.9 GHz	24 × 1 MB	35.75 MB	240 W	LGA 3647	3× 10.4 GT/s UPI	6× DDR4-2933			OEM
Xeon Platinum 8276	SRF99 (B1)	28 (56)	2.2 GHz	3.0/4.0 GHz	28 × 1 MB	38.5 MB	165 W	LGA 3647	3× 10.4 GT/s UPI	6× DDR4-2933	2 April 2019	CD8069504195501	$8719
Xeon Platinum 8276L	SRF97 (B1)	28 (56)	2.2 GHz	3.0/4.0 GHz	28 × 1 MB	38.5 MB	165 W	LGA 3647	3× 10.4 GT/s UPI	6× DDR4-2933	2 April 2019	CD8069504195301	$16,616
Xeon Platinum 8276M	SRF98 (B1)	28 (56)	2.2 GHz	3.0/4.0 GHz	28 × 1 MB	38.5 MB	165 W	LGA 3647	3× 10.4 GT/s UPI	6× DDR4-2933	2 April 2019	CD8069504195401	$11,722
Xeon Platinum 8279W	SRGWA (B1)	28 (56)	2.5 GHz	3.2/4.6 GHz	28 × 1 MB	38.5 MB	205 W	LGA 3647	3× 10.4 GT/s UPI	6× DDR4-2933			OEM
Xeon Platinum 8280	SRF9P (B1)	28 (56)	2.7 GHz	3.3/4.0 GHz	28 × 1 MB	38.5 MB	205 W	LGA 3647	3× 10.4 GT/s UPI	6× DDR4-2933	2 April 2019	CD8069504228001	$10,009
Xeon Platinum 8280L	SRF9R (B1)	28 (56)	2.7 GHz	3.3/4.0 GHz	28 × 1 MB	38.5 MB	205 W	LGA 3647	3× 10.4 GT/s UPI	6× DDR4-2933	2 April 2019	CD8069504228201	$17,906
Xeon Platinum 8280M	SRF9Q (B1)	28 (56)	2.7 GHz	3.3/4.0 GHz	28 × 1 MB	38.5 MB	205 W	LGA 3647	3× 10.4 GT/s UPI	6× DDR4-2933	2 April 2019	CD8069504228101	$13,012
Xeon Platinum 8284	SRFPY (B1)	28 (56)	3 GHz	3.0/4.0 GHz	28 × 1 MB	38.5 MB	240 W	LGA 3647	3× 10.4 GT/s UPI	6× DDR4-2933	Q2 2019	CD8069504284302	$15,460

== "Cascade Lake-AP" (14 nm) Advanced Performance ==
- Support up to two sockets
- 2 dies per socket

=== Xeon Platinum (dual processor) ===
Model number	sSpec number	Cores (threads)	Frequency	Turbo Boost all-core/2.0)	L2 cache	L3 cache	TDP	Socket	I/O bus	Memory	Release date	Part number(s)	Release price (USD)
Xeon Platinum 9221		32 (64)	2.3 GHz	2.5/3.7 GHz	32 × 1 MB	71.5 MB	250 W	BGA 5903	4× 10.4 GT/s UPI	12× DDR4-2933	2 April 2019		OEM
Xeon Platinum 9222		32 (64)	2.3 GHz	2.5/3.7 GHz	32 × 1 MB	71.5 MB	250 W	BGA 5903	4× 10.4 GT/s UPI	12× DDR4-2933	2 April 2019		OEM
Xeon Platinum 9242		48 (96)	2.3 GHz	2.5/3.8 GHz	48 × 1 MB	71.5 MB	350 W	BGA 5903	4× 10.4 GT/s UPI	12× DDR4-2933	2 April 2019		OEM
Xeon Platinum 9282		56 (112)	2.6 GHz	2.8/3.8 GHz	56 × 1 MB	77.0 MB	400 W	BGA 5903	4× 10.4 GT/s UPI	12× DDR4-2933	2 April 2019		OEM

== "Cascade Lake-W" (14 nm) ==
- All models support: MMX, SSE, SSE2, SSE3, SSSE3, SSE4.1, SSE4.2, AVX, AVX2, AVX-512, FMA3, MPX, Enhanced Intel SpeedStep Technology (EIST), Intel 64, XD bit (an NX bit implementation), Intel VT-x, Intel VT-d, Turbo Boost, Hyper-threading, AES-NI, Intel TSX-NI, Smart Cache, DL Boost.
- PCI Express lanes: 48
- Supports up to 8 DIMMs of DDR4 memory, maximum 1 TB.

=== Xeon W-22xx (uniprocessor) ===
Model number	sSpec number	Cores (threads)	Frequency	Turbo Boost all-core/2.0 (/max. 3.0)	L2 cache	L3 cache	TDP	Socket	I/O bus	Memory	Release date	Part number(s)	Release price (USD)
Xeon W-2223	SRGSX (L1)	4 (8)	3.6 GHz	3.7/3.9/- GHz	4 × 1 MB	8.25 MB	120 W	LGA 2066	DMI 3.0	4× DDR4-2666	7 October 2019	CD8069504394701; BX80695W2223	$297
Xeon W-2225	SRH03 (L1)	4 (8)	4.1 GHz	4.5/4.6/- GHz	4 × 1 MB	8.25 MB	105 W	LGA 2066	DMI 3.0	4× DDR4-2933	7 October 2019	CD8069504394102	$444
Xeon W-2235	SRGVA (L1)	6 (12)	3.8 GHz	4.3/4.6/- GHz	6 × 1 MB	8.25 MB	130 W	LGA 2066	DMI 3.0	4× DDR4-2933	7 October 2019	CD8069504439102; BX80695W2235	$555
Xeon W-2245	SRH02 (L1)	8 (16)	3.9 GHz	4.5/4.5/4.7 GHz	8 × 1 MB	16.5 MB	155 W	LGA 2066	DMI 3.0	4× DDR4-2933	7 October 2019	CD8069504393801	$667
Xeon W-2255	SRGV8 (L1)	10 (20)	3.7 GHz	4.3/4.5/4.7 GHz	10 × 1 MB	19.25 MB	165 W	LGA 2066	DMI 3.0	4× DDR4-2933	7 October 2019	CD8069504393600	$778
Xeon W-2265	SRGSQ (L1)	12 (24)	3.5 GHz	4.3/4.6/4.8 GHz	12 × 1 MB	19.25 MB	165 W	LGA 2066	DMI 3.0	4× DDR4-2933	7 October 2019	CD8069504393400	$944
Xeon W-2275	SRGSP (L1)	14 (28)	3.3 GHz	4.1/4.6/4.8 GHz	14 × 1 MB	19.25 MB	165 W	LGA 2066	DMI 3.0	4× DDR4-2933	7 October 2019	CD8069504393300	$1112
Xeon W-2295	SRGSL (L1)	18 (36)	3 GHz	3.8/4.6/4.8 GHz	18 × 1 MB	24.75 MB	165 W	LGA 2066	DMI 3.0	4× DDR4-2933	7 October 2019	CD8069504393000	$1333

=== Xeon W-32xx (uniprocessor) ===
- PCI Express lanes: 64
- Supports up to 12 DIMMs of DDR4 memory, maximum 1 TB.
- -M: Medium DDR memory tier support (up to 2 TB)

Model number	sSpec number	Cores (threads)	Frequency	Turbo Boost all-core/2.0 (/max. 3.0)	L2 cache	L3 cache	TDP	Socket	I/O bus	Memory	Release date	Part number(s)	Release price (USD)
Xeon W-3223	SRFFG (B1)	8 (16)	3.5 GHz	3.7/4.0/4.2 GHz	8 × 1 MB	16.5 MB	160 W	LGA 3647	DMI 3.0	6× DDR4-2666	June 2019	CD8069504248402	$749
Xeon W-3225	SRFFB (B1)	8 (16)	3.7 GHz	4.2/4.3/4.4 GHz	8 × 1 MB	16.5 MB	160 W	LGA 3647	DMI 3.0	6× DDR4-2666	June 2019	CD8069504152705	$1199
Xeon W-3235	SRFFC (B1)	12 (24)	3.3 GHz	4.3/4.4/4.5 GHz	12 × 1 MB	19.25 MB	180 W	LGA 3647	DMI 3.0	6× DDR4-2933	June 2019	CD8069504152802	$1398
Xeon W-3245	SRFFD (B1)	16 (32)	3.2 GHz	3.9/4.4/4.6 GHz	16 × 1 MB	22 MB	205 W	LGA 3647	DMI 3.0	6× DDR4-2933	June 2019	CD8069504152900	$1999
Xeon W-3245M	SRFFH (B1)	16 (32)	3.2 GHz	4.0/4.4/4.6 GHz	16 × 1 MB	22 MB	205 W	LGA 3647	DMI 3.0	6× DDR4-2933	June 2019	CD8069504248501	$5002
Xeon W-3265	SRFFE (B1)	24 (48)	2.7 GHz	3.6/4.4/4.6 GHz	24 × 1 MB	33 MB	205 W	LGA 3647	DMI 3.0	6× DDR4-2933	June 2019	CD8069504153002	$3349
Xeon W-3265M	SRFFJ (B1)	24 (48)	2.7 GHz	3.6/4.4/4.6 GHz	24 × 1 MB	33 MB	205 W	LGA 3647	DMI 3.0	6× DDR4-2933	June 2019	CD8069504248601	$6353
Xeon W-3275	SRFFF (B1)	28 (56)	2.5 GHz	3.4/4.4/4.6 GHz	28 × 1 MB	38.5 MB	205 W	LGA 3647	DMI 3.0	6× DDR4-2933	June 2019	CD8069504153101	$4449
Xeon W-3275M	SRFFK (B1)	28 (56)	2.5 GHz	3.2/4.4/4.6 GHz	28 × 1 MB	38.5 MB	205 W	LGA 3647	DMI 3.0	6× DDR4-2933	June 2019	CD8069504248702	$7453
