= Intel X99 =

Intel chipset

- Codename(s): Wellsburg
- CPU supported: Intel Core i7 Extreme (Haswell-E and Broadwell-E); Intel Xeon E5-16xx v3, E5-26xx v3 (Haswell-EP); Intel Xeon E5-16xx v4, E5-26xx v4 (Broadwell-EP)
- Socket supported: LGA 2011-v3
- Fabrication process: 32nm
- TDP: 6.5 W

Miscellaneous
- Release date(s): August 2014
- Predecessor: Intel X79
- Successor: Intel X299

Intel X99, codenamed "Wellsburg", is a Platform Controller Hub (PCH) designed and manufactured by Intel, targeted at the high-end desktop (HEDT) and enthusiast segments of the Intel product lineup. The X99 chipset supports both Intel Core i7 Extreme and Intel Xeon E5-16xx v3 and E5-26xx v3 processors, which belong to the Haswell-E and Haswell-EP variants of the Haswell microarchitecture, respectively. All supported processors use the LGA 2011-v3 socket.

The X99 chipset was released in late August 2014, while the supported processors were released in late August 2014 (Haswell-E) and early September 2014 (Haswell-EP). In May 2016, X99's processor support was extended to the Broadwell variants of the Intel Core i7 Extreme and Intel Xeon E5-16xx v4 and E5-26xx v4 processors, which belong to the Broadwell-E and Broadwell-EP variants of the Broadwell microarchitecture, respectively.

== Features ==
High-level diagram of the Intel X99 high-end desktop (enthusiast) platform

The X99 chipset uses a Direct Media Interface (DMI) 2.0 ×4 link for the connection between the processor and itself; that way, a total bandwidth of 20 Gbit/s is available to all connectivity options provided by the chipset. Up to eight PCI Express 2.0 lanes are provided by the X99 chipset, with speeds of up to 5 Gbit/s per lane and a possibility to configure these lanes into ×1, ×2 and ×4 links. Additionally, the X99 chipset supports a configurable layout of the PCI Express 3.0 lanes provided by the processor, which may be configured as up to two ×16 links and one ×8 link, or up to five ×8 links (the total number of available PCI Express 3.0 lanes depends on the processor used).

Two Serial ATA (SATA) 3.0 controllers are integrated into the X99 chipset, providing a total of up to ten ports for storage devices and supporting speeds of up to 6 Gbit/s per port, with hardware support for the Advanced Host Controller Interface (AHCI) logical interface. Each SATA port may be enabled or disabled as needed. Six SATA ports provided by the first controller may be configured for Rapid Storage Technology (RST) 13.1, which supports RAID 0, 1, 5 and 10 levels; additionally, Smart Response Technology (SRT) disk caching allows the creation of hybrid volumes.

SATA Express and M.2 are also supported, providing the ability for interfacing with PCI Express-based storage devices. Each of the X99's SATA Express ports requires two PCI Express 2.0 lanes provided by the chipset, while the M.2 slots can use either two 2.0 lanes from the chipset itself, or up to four 3.0 lanes taken directly from the processor. As a result, the X99 provides bandwidths of up to 3.94 GB/s for connected PCI Express storage devices.

One Extensible Host Controller Interface (xHCI) controller and two Enhanced Host Controller Interface (EHCI) controllers are integrated into the X99 chipset, providing a total of up to 14 USB ports. Out of those ports, up to six can be configured as USB 3.0 ports with speeds of up to 5 Gbit/s per port, while the remaining are USB 2.0 ports with speeds of up to 480 Mbit/s per port. Each USB port may also be enabled or disabled as needed. Integrated Intel High Definition Audio (HD Audio) supports up to four hardware audio codecs and multi-channel audio streams. An Intel Gigabit Ethernet controller is also integrated, supporting (among other features) receive-side scaling (RSS) with two hardware receive queues.

Some of the connectivity options and interfaces provided by the X99 chipset are configurable via Flexible I/O, which allows certain hardware capacities of the chipset to be selectively distributed between the PCI Express, USB 3.0 and SATA interfaces. That way, connectivity options of the X99 chipset may be adjusted to fit the needs of a particular motherboard implementation; for example, some of the SATA or USB 3.0 ports may be exchanged for additional PCI Express 2.0 lanes.

The X99 chipset supports Virtualization Technology for Directed I/O (Intel VT-d), which provides hardware support for virtualization by implementing an input/output memory management unit (IOMMU). The chipset also integrates a Low Pin Count (LPC) interface, supporting interrupt controllers, timers, power management, super I/O, real-time clock (RTC), etc. Integrated Serial Peripheral Interface (SPI) allows interfacing with devices such as Trusted Platform Modules (TPMs) and serial flash devices. System Management Bus (SMBus) is also provided, with additional support for I^{2}C devices.

Overclocking is available for unlocked variants of the supported processors. As a significant new feature, the X99 enthusiast platform as a whole was the first to support DDR4 memory. Thanks to the features of integrated memory controllers (IMCs) of supported processors, the X99 platform also supports dual- and quad-channel memory layouts, with optional support for registered ECC memory.

== See also ==
- Intel X58 and Intel X79 – earlier Intel chipsets for the enthusiast segment
- List of Intel chipsets
- List of Intel Xeon microprocessors
