= LGA 3647 =

Intel CPU socket for servers (released 2016)

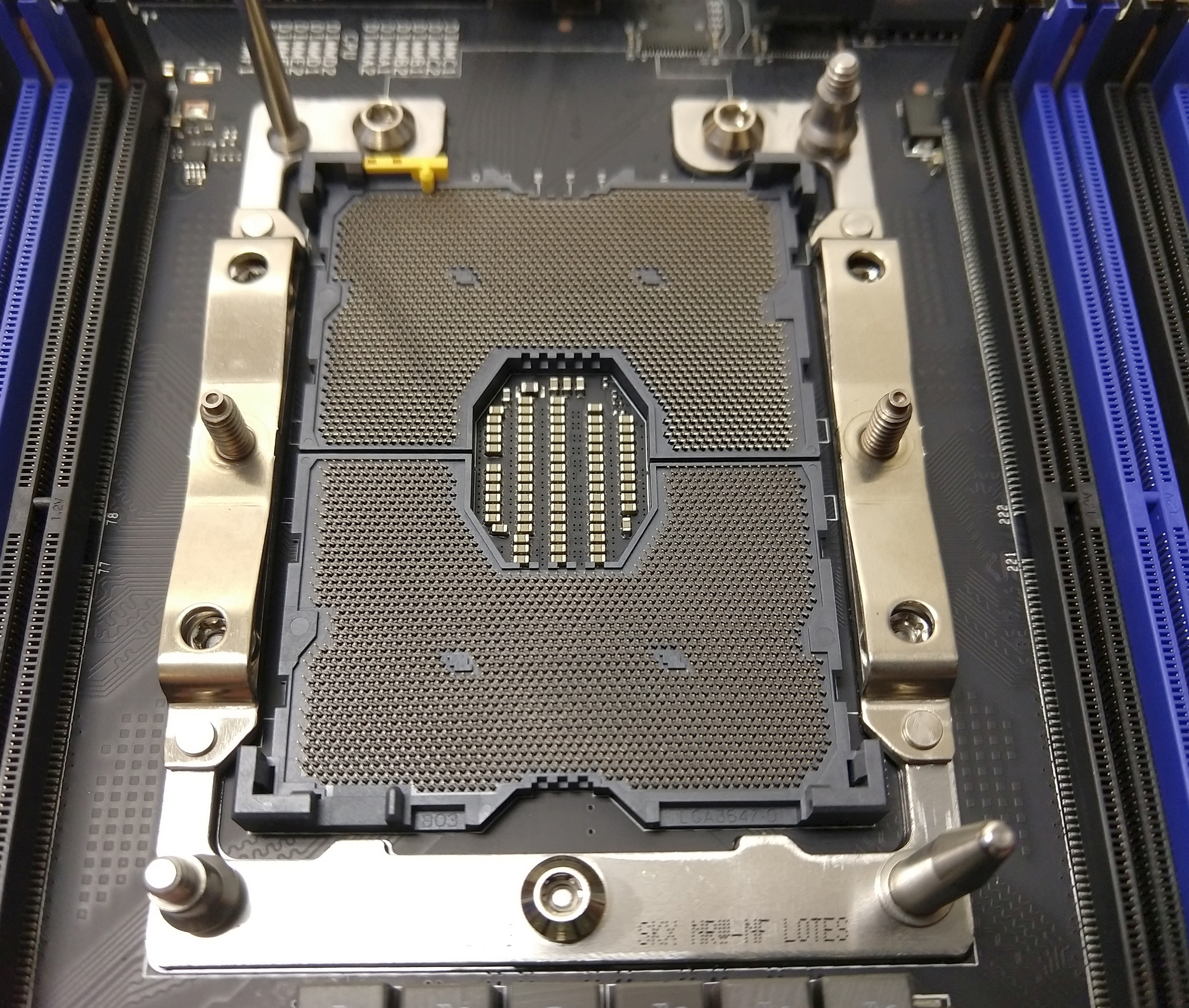
- Release date: 2016
- Designed by: Intel
- Manufactured by: Lotes
- Type: LGA-ZIF
- Chip form factors: Flip-chip
- Contacts: 3647
- FSB protocol: Intel UPI; DMI 3.0; PCI Express
- Processor dimensions: 76.0mm × 56.5mm 4,294mm^{2}
- Processors: Knights Landing; Knights Mill; Skylake-SP; Cascade Lake-SP; Cascade Lake-W
- Predecessor: LGA 2011
- Variant: LGA 2066 (HEDTs and workstations)
- Successor: LGA 4189
- Memory support: DDR4
- This article is part of the CPU socket series

LGA 3647 is an Intel microprocessor compatible socket used by Xeon Phi x200 ("Knights Landing"), Xeon Phi 72x5 ("Knights Mill"), Skylake-SP, Cascade Lake-SP, and Cascade Lake-W microprocessors.

The socket supports a 6-channel memory controller, non-volatile 3D XPoint memory DIMMs, Intel Ultra Path Interconnect (UPI), as a replacement for Quick Path Interconnect (QPI), and 100G Omni-Path interconnect and also has a new mounting mechanism which does not use a lever to secure it in place but the CPU cooler's pressure and its screws to secure it in place.

== Variants ==
There are two sub-versions of this socket with differences also in the ILM (Independent Loading Mechanism, pitch of center screws changed slightly and a more visible one being that the guiding pins are in other corners). The processor socket and the matching notches on the processor are at different location, preventing insertion of an incompatible processor and preventing use of the wrong heatsink in a system. The more common P0 variant has two sub-options for heatsink mounting – designated as square ILM and narrow ILM, choice of which depends on the server and mainboard design (likely based on space constraints).

- LGA3647-0 (socket P0) used for Skylake-SP and Cascade Lake-SP processors
- LGA3647-1 (socket P1) used for Xeon Phi x200 processors

== Pinout ==
Socket seen from above

CPU seen from below (pad side)

Contact map of socket P0 (LGA3647-0), colored by function: DDR4 memory channels, PCIe, DMI3, UPI, power and ground. Pin coordinates and signal names from Intel's datasheet.
