= LGA 2066 =

Intel CPU socket

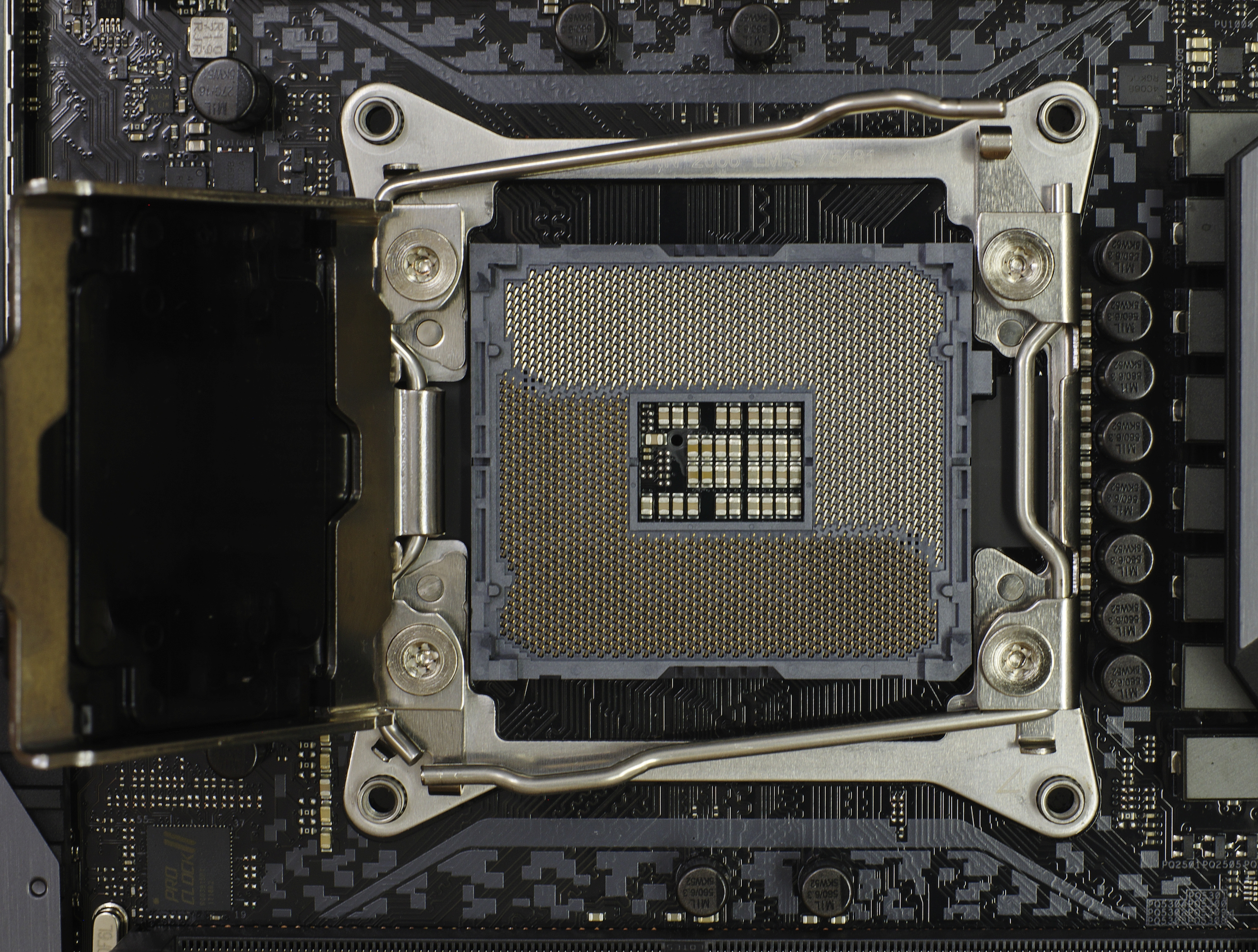
- Type: LGA
- Chip form factors: Flip-chip land grid array (FCLGA)
- Contacts: 2066
- FSB protocol: Intel QPI; DMI 3.0
- Processors: Kaby Lake-X; Skylake-X; Skylake-W; Cascade Lake-X; Cascade Lake-W
- Predecessor: LGA 2011
- Successor: LGA 4189; LGA 1200
- Memory support: DDR4
- This article is part of the CPU socket series

LGA 2066, also called Socket R4, is a CPU socket by Intel that debuted with Skylake-X and Kaby Lake-X processors in June 2017. It replaces Intel's LGA 2011-3 (R3) in the performance, high-end desktop and Workstation platforms (based on the X299 "Basin Falls" and C422 chipsets), while LGA 3647 (Socket P) replaces LGA 2011-3 (R3) in the server platforms based on Skylake-SP (Xeon "Purley").

LGA 2066 and LGA 1151 are the last two Intel sockets to officially support Windows 7, Windows Server 2008 R2, Windows 8, Windows Server 2012, Windows 8.1 and Windows Server 2012 R2 and the earliest two Intel sockets to officially support all versions of Windows 11.

== Compatible processors ==
=== High-End Desktop (HEDT) ===
All of these CPUs require the Intel X299 chipset to work. So, the C422 chipset is strictly limited to work with workstation processors only.

==== Kaby Lake-X ====
Kaby Lake-X processors were discontinued in May 2018. Starting October 2019, BIOS updates for most of the X299-based motherboards removed support for Kaby Lake-X processors.

Name	Cores (threads)	Base Clock	Turbo Boost 2.0		Turbo Boost 3.0	Memory support	L2 cache	L3 cache (MB)	PCIe 3.0 lanes	TDP	Release date	Price (USD)
Name	Cores (threads)	Base Clock	Single core	All cores	Turbo Boost 3.0	Memory support	L2 cache	L3 cache (MB)	PCIe 3.0 lanes	TDP	Release date	Price (USD)
Core i5-7640X	4 (4)	4.0 GHz	4.2 GHz	4.0 GHz	—N/a	2 × DDR4-2666 up to 64 GB	256 KB per core	6	16	112 W	Q2'17	$242
Core i7-7740X	4 (8)	4.3 GHz	4.5 GHz		—N/a	2 × DDR4-2666 up to 64 GB	256 KB per core	8	16	112 W	Q2'17	$339

==== Skylake-X 7000-series ====
Name	Cores (threads)	Base Clock	Turbo Boost 2.0		Turbo Boost 3.0	Memory support	L2 cache	L3 cache (MB)	PCIe 3.0 lanes	TDP	Release date	Price (USD)
Name	Cores (threads)	Base Clock	Single core	All cores	Turbo Boost 3.0	Memory support	L2 cache	L3 cache (MB)	PCIe 3.0 lanes	TDP	Release date	Price (USD)
Core i7-7800X	6 (12)	3.5 GHz	4.0 GHz		N/A	4 × DDR4-2400 up to 128 GB	1 MB per core	8.25	28	140 W	Q2'17	$389
Core i7-7820X	8 (16)	3.6 GHz	4.3 GHz	4.0 GHz	4.5 GHz	4 × DDR4-2666 up to 128 GB	1 MB per core	11	28	140 W	Q2'17	$599
Core i9-7900X	10 (20)	3.3 GHz	4.3 GHz	4.0 GHz	4.5 GHz	4 × DDR4-2666 up to 128 GB	1 MB per core	13.75	44	140 W	Q2'17	$999
Core i9-7920X	12 (24)	2.9 GHz	4.3 GHz	3.8 GHz	4.4 GHz	4 × DDR4-2666 up to 128 GB	1 MB per core	16.5	44	140 W	Q3'17	$1199
Core i9-7940X	14 (28)	3.1 GHz	4.3 GHz	3.8 GHz	4.4 GHz	4 × DDR4-2666 up to 128 GB	1 MB per core	19.25	44	165 W	Q3'17	$1399
Core i9-7960X	16 (32)	2.8 GHz	4.2 GHz	3.6 GHz	4.4 GHz	4 × DDR4-2666 up to 128 GB	1 MB per core	22	44	165 W	Q3'17	$1699
Core i9-7980XE	18 (36)	2.6 GHz	4.2 GHz	3.4 GHz	4.4 GHz	4 × DDR4-2666 up to 128 GB	1 MB per core	24.75	44	165 W	Q3'17	$1999

==== Skylake-X 9000-series ====
Name	Cores (threads)	Base Clock	Turbo Boost 2.0		Turbo Boost 3.0	Memory support	L2 cache	L3 cache (MB)	PCIe 3.0 lanes	TDP	Release date	Price (USD)
Name	Cores (threads)	Base Clock	Single core	All cores	Turbo Boost 3.0	Memory support	L2 cache	L3 cache (MB)	PCIe 3.0 lanes	TDP	Release date	Price (USD)
Core i7-9800X	8 (16)	3.8 GHz	4.4 GHz		4.5 GHz	4 × DDR4-2666 up to 128 GB	1 MB per core	16.5	44	165 W	Q4'18	$589
Core i9-9820X	10 (20)	3.3 GHz	4.1 GHz		4.2 GHz	4 × DDR4-2666 up to 128 GB	1 MB per core	16.5	44	165 W	Q4'18	$889
Core i9-9900X	10 (20)	3.5 GHz	4.4 GHz		4.5 GHz	4 × DDR4-2666 up to 128 GB	1 MB per core	19.25	44	165 W	Q4'18	$989
Core i9-9920X	12 (24)	3.5 GHz	4.4 GHz		4.5 GHz	4 × DDR4-2666 up to 128 GB	1 MB per core	19.25	44	165 W	Q4'18	$1189
Core i9-9940X	14 (28)	3.3 GHz	4.4 GHz		4.5 GHz	4 × DDR4-2666 up to 128 GB	1 MB per core	19.25	44	165 W	Q4'18	$1387
Core i9-9960X	16 (32)	3.1 GHz	4.4 GHz		4.5 GHz	4 × DDR4-2666 up to 128 GB	1 MB per core	22	44	165 W	Q4'18	$1684
Core i9-9980XE	18 (36)	3.0 GHz	4.4 GHz	3.8 GHz	4.5 GHz	4 × DDR4-2666 up to 128 GB	1 MB per core	24.75	44	165 W	Q4'18	$1999

==== Cascade Lake-X ====
Name	Cores (threads)	Base Clock	Turbo Boost 2.0		Turbo Boost 3.0	Memory support	L2 cache	L3 cache (MB)	PCIe 3.0 lanes	TDP	Release date	Price (USD)
Name	Cores (threads)	Base Clock	Single core	All cores	Turbo Boost 3.0	Memory support	L2 cache	L3 cache (MB)	PCIe 3.0 lanes	TDP	Release date	Price (USD)
Core i9-10900X	10 (20)	3.7 GHz	4.5 GHz	4.3 GHz	4.7 GHz	4 × DDR4-2933 up to 256 GB	1 MB per core	19.25	48	165W	Q4'19	$599
Core i9-10920X	12 (24)	3.5 GHz	4.6 GHz	4.3 GHz	4.8 GHz	4 × DDR4-2933 up to 256 GB	1 MB per core	19.25	48	165W	Q4'19	$700
Core i9-10940X	14 (28)	3.3 GHz	4.6 GHz	4.1 GHz	4.8 GHz	4 × DDR4-2933 up to 256 GB	1 MB per core	19.25	48	165W	Q4'19	$797
Core i9-10980XE	18 (36)	3.0 GHz	4.6 GHz	3.8 GHz	4.8 GHz	4 × DDR4-2933 up to 256 GB	1 MB per core	24.75	48	165W	Q4'19	$1000

=== Workstation ===
Take note that certain types of Xeon processors will not work on this socket, like Skylake-P. There are four OEM variants that can be found in Apple Mac Pro: W-2140B and W-2150B (lower freq/TDP than their W-21x5 counterparts), W-2170B and W-2191B lack Trusted_Execution_Technology (TXT) in comparison.

==== Skylake-W ====
Name	Cores (threads)	Base Clock	Turbo Boost 2.0		Memory support	L2 cache	L3 cache (MB)	PCIe 3.0 lanes	TDP	Release date	Price (USD)
Name	Cores (threads)	Base Clock	Single core	All cores	Memory support	L2 cache	L3 cache (MB)	PCIe 3.0 lanes	TDP	Release date	Price (USD)
Xeon W‑2102	4 (4)	2.9 GHz	N/A		4 x DDR4‑2400 up to 512 GB	1 MB per core	8.25	48	120 W	Q3'17	$202
Xeon W‑2104	4 (4)	3.2 GHz	N/A		4 x DDR4‑2400 up to 512 GB	1 MB per core	8.25	48	120 W	Q3'17	$255
Xeon W‑2123	4 (8)	3.6 GHz	3.9 GHz	3.7 GHz	4 × DDR4‑2666 up to 512 GB	1 MB per core	8.25	48	120 W	Q3'17	$294
Xeon W‑2125	4 (8)	4.0 GHz	4.5 GHz	4.4 GHz	4 × DDR4‑2666 up to 512 GB	1 MB per core	8.25	48	120 W	Q3'17	$444
Xeon W‑2133	6 (12)	3.6 GHz	3.9 GHz	3.8 GHz	4 × DDR4‑2666 up to 512 GB	1 MB per core	8.25	48	140 W	Q3'17	$617
Xeon W‑2135	6 (12)	3.7 GHz	4.5 GHz	4.4 GHz	4 × DDR4‑2666 up to 512 GB	1 MB per core	8.25	48	140 W	Q3'17	$835
Xeon W‑2140B*	8 (16)	3.2 GHz	4.2 GHz	3.8 GHz	4 × DDR4‑2666 up to 512 GB	1 MB per core	11	48	120 W	Q3'17	N/A
Xeon W‑2145	8 (16)	3.7 GHz	4.5 GHz	4.3 GHz	4 × DDR4‑2666 up to 512 GB	1 MB per core	11	48	140 W	Q3'17	$1113
Xeon W‑2155	10 (20)	3.3 GHz	4.5 GHz	4.0 GHz	4 × DDR4‑2666 up to 512 GB	1 MB per core	13.75	48	140 W	Q4'17	$1440
Xeon W‑2175	14 (28)	2.5 GHz	4.3 GHz	3.3 GHz	4 × DDR4‑2666 up to 512 GB	1 MB per core	19.25	48	140 W	Q4'17	$1950
Xeon W‑2195	18 (36)	2.3 GHz	4.3 GHz	3.2 GHz	4 × DDR4‑2666 up to 512 GB	1 MB per core	24.75	48	140 W	Q3'17	$2553

(* = OEM CPU found in Apple Mac Pro with lower TDP)

==== Cascade Lake-W ====
Name	Cores (threads)	Base Clock	Turbo Boost 2.0		Turbo Boost 3.0	Memory support	L2 cache	L3 cache (MB)	PCIe 3.0 lanes	TDP	Release date	Price (USD)
Name	Cores (threads)	Base Clock	Single core	All cores	Turbo Boost 3.0	Memory support	L2 cache	L3 cache (MB)	PCIe 3.0 lanes	TDP	Release date	Price (USD)
Xeon W-2223	4 (8)	3.6 GHz	3.9 GHz	3.7 GHz	N/A	4 × DDR4‑2666 up to 1 TB	1 MB per core	8.25	48	120 W	Q4'19	$297
Xeon W-2225	4 (8)	4.1 GHz	4.6 GHz	4.5 GHz	N/A	4 x DDR4-2933 up to 1 TB	1 MB per core	8.25	48	105 W	Q4'19	$444
Xeon W-2235	6 (12)	3.8 GHz	4.6 GHz	4.3 GHz	N/A	4 x DDR4-2933 up to 1 TB	1 MB per core	8.25	48	130 W	Q4'19	$555
Xeon W-2245	8 (16)	3.9 GHz	4.5 GHz	4.5 GHz	4.7 GHz	4 x DDR4-2933 up to 1 TB	1 MB per core	16.5	48	155 W	Q4'19	$667
Xeon W-2255	10 (20)	3.7 GHz	4.5 GHz	4.3 GHz	4.7 GHz	4 x DDR4-2933 up to 1 TB	1 MB per core	19.25	48	165 W	Q4'19	$778
Xeon W-2265	12 (24)	3.5 GHz	4.6 GHz	4.3 GHz	4.8 GHz	4 x DDR4-2933 up to 1 TB	1 MB per core	19.25	48	165 W	Q4'19	$944
Xeon W-2275	14 (28)	3.3 GHz	4.6 GHz	4.1 GHz	4.8 GHz	4 x DDR4-2933 up to 1 TB	1 MB per core	19.25	48	165 W	Q4'19	$1112
Xeon W-2295	18 (36)	3.0 GHz	4.6 GHz	3.8 GHz	4.8 GHz	4 x DDR4-2933 up to 1 TB	1 MB per core	24.75	48	165 W	Q4'19	$1333
