= Cascade Lake =

Intel processor family (launched in 2019)

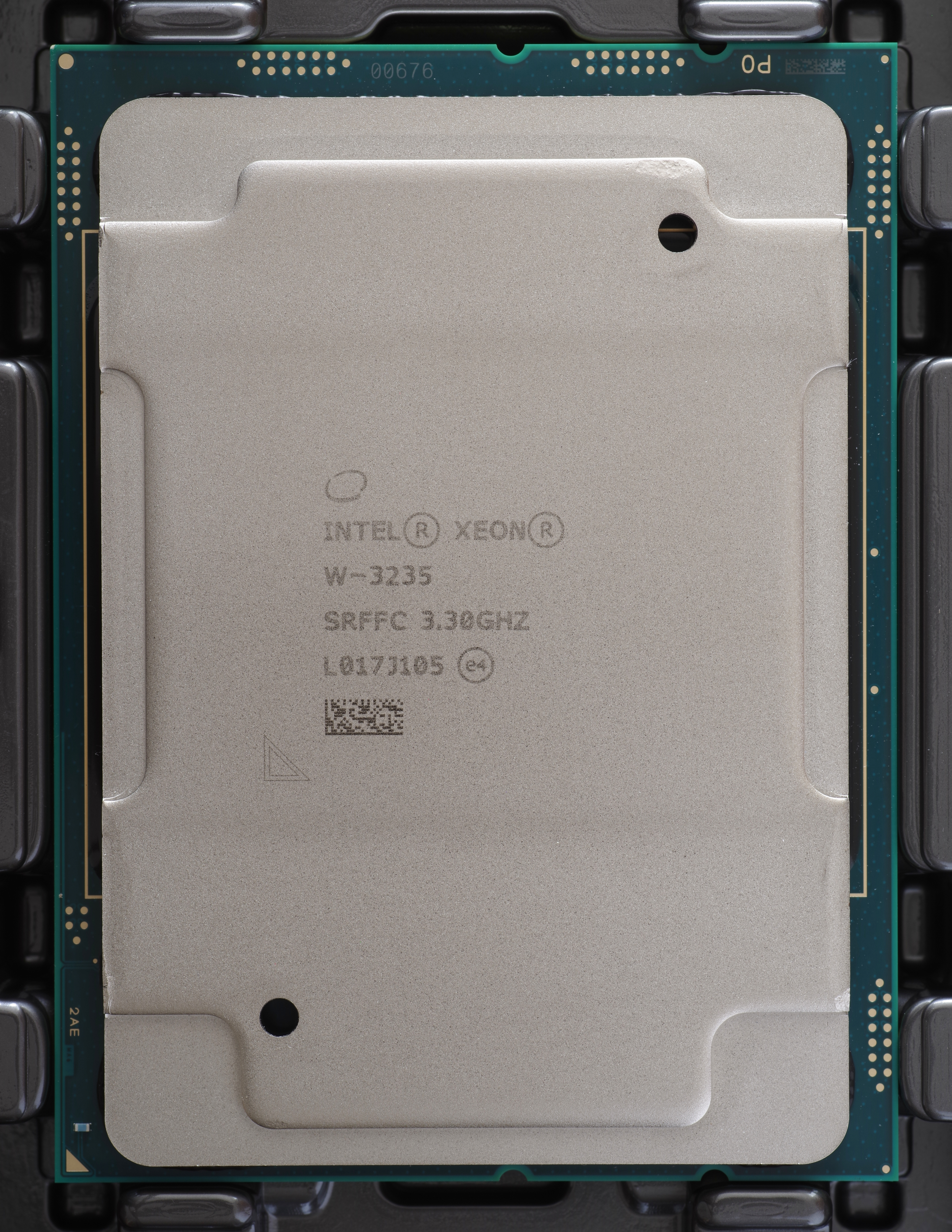
- Xeon W-3235 with 12 cores

General information
- Launched: April 2, 2019; 7 years ago
- Marketed by: Intel
- Designed by: Intel
- Common manufacturer: Intel
- Product code: 80695

Performance
- Max. CPU clock rate: Up to 4.8 GHz
- QPI speeds: 9.6 GT/s to 10.4 GT/s
- DMI speeds: 8 GT/s

Physical specifications
- Cores: 4-56
- Sockets: LGA 2066 (Cascade Lake-X); LGA 3647 (Cascade Lake-SP and Cascade Lake-W); BGA 5903 (Cascade Lake-AP)

Cache
- L1 cache: 64 KB per core (32 instructions + 32 data)
- L2 cache: 1 MB per core
- L3 cache: Up to 77 MB (1.375 MiB/core)

Architecture and classification
- Technology node: 14 nm (Tri-Gate) transistors
- Microarchitecture: Skylake
- Instruction set: x86-64
- Instructions: MMX, SSE, SSE2, SSE3, SSSE3, SSE4.1, SSE4.2, AVX, AVX2, FMA3, AVX-512,
- Extensions: AES-NI, CLMUL, RDRAND, MPX, TXT, TSX, VT-x, VT-d

Products, models, variants
- Product code name: CSL
- Models: Cascade Lake-X (enthusiast); Cascade Lake-SP (Scalable Performance); Cascade Lake-W (workstation); Cascade Lake-AP (Advanced Performance)
- Brand name: Core X-Series; Xeon

History
- Predecessor: Skylake
- Successors: 1S & 2S Systems: Ice Lake; 4S & 8S Systems: Cooper Lake

Support status
- Xeon Scalable: Discontinued as of October 2, 2023; Xeon W-2200 and Core X-Series: Discontinued after April 26, 2024

Cascade Lake is an Intel codename for a 14 nm server, workstation and enthusiast processor generation, launched in April 2019. In Intel's process–architecture–optimization model, Cascade Lake is an optimization of Skylake. Intel states that this will be their first generation to support 3D XPoint-based memory modules. It also features Deep Learning Boost (DPL) instructions and mitigations for Meltdown and Spectre. Intel officially launched new Xeon Scalable SKUs on February 24, 2020.

== Variants ==
- Server: Cascade Lake-SP, Cascade Lake-AP
- Workstation: Cascade Lake-W
- Enthusiast: Cascade Lake-X

== List of Cascade Lake processors ==
=== Cascade Lake-X (HEDT) ===
Name	sSpec number (stepping)	Cores (threads)	Base clock	Turbo Boost 2.0		Turbo Boost 3.0	Memory support	Socket	Optane memory support	Cache		PCIe 3.0 lanes	TDP	Release date	Part number(s)	Price (USD)
Name	sSpec number (stepping)	Cores (threads)	Base clock	Single core	All cores	Turbo Boost 3.0	Memory support	Socket	Optane memory support	L2	L3	PCIe 3.0 lanes	TDP	Release date	Part number(s)	Price (USD)
Core i9-10980XE	SRGSG (L1)	18 (36)	3.0 GHz	4.6 GHz	3.8 GHz	4.8 GHz	4 × DDR4-2933 up to 256 GiB	LGA2066	Yes	1 MB per core	24.75 MB	48	165 W	25 November 2019	CD8069504381800; BXC8069510980XE	$979-$1000
Core i9-10940X	SRGSH (L1)	14 (28)	3.3 GHz	4.6 GHz	4.1 GHz	4.8 GHz	4 × DDR4-2933 up to 256 GiB	LGA2066	Yes	1 MB per core	19.25 MB	48	165 W	25 November 2019	CD8069504381900; BX8069510940X	$784-$797
Core i9-10920X	SRGSJ (L1)	12 (24)	3.5 GHz	4.6 GHz	4.3 GHz	4.8 GHz	4 × DDR4-2933 up to 256 GiB	LGA2066	Yes	1 MB per core	19.25 MB	48	165 W	25 November 2019	CD8069504382000; BX8069510920X	$689-$700
Core i9-10900X	SRGV7 (L1)	10 (20)	3.7 GHz	4.5 GHz	4.3 GHz	4.7 GHz	4 × DDR4-2933 up to 256 GiB	LGA2066	Yes	1 MB per core	19.25 MB	48	165 W	25 November 2019	CD8069504382100; BX8069510900X	$590-$599

=== Cascade Lake-AP (Advanced Performance) ===
Cascade Lake-AP is branded as Xeon Platinum 9200 series and all SKUs are soldered to the motherboard. These CPUs will not work with Optane Memory.

==== Xeon Platinum 9200 series ====
Model number	sSpec number	Cores (threads)	Frequency	Turbo Boost	L2 Cache	L3 Cache	TDP	Socket	I/O Bus	Memory	Release date	Part number(s)	Release Price
9282		56 (112)	2.60 GHz	3.80 GHz	56 x 1 MB	77 MB	400W	BGA5903	4 UPI	12 x DDR4-2933	April 2, 2019		
9242		48 (96)	2.30 GHz	3.80 GHz	48 x 1 MB	71.5 MB	350W	BGA5903	4 UPI	12 x DDR4-2933	April 2, 2019		
9222		32 (64)	2.30 GHz	3.70 GHz	32 x 1 MB	71.5 MB	250W	BGA5903	4 UPI	12 x DDR4-2933	April 2, 2019		
9221		32 (64)	2.10 GHz	3.70 GHz	32 x 1 MB	71.5 MB	250W	BGA5903	4 UPI	12 x DDR4-2933	April 2, 2019		

=== Cascade Lake-SP (Scalable Performance) ===
==== Xeon Platinum 8200 series ====
Model number	sSpec number	Cores (threads)	Frequency	Turbo Boost	L2 Cache	L3 Cache	TDP	Socket	I/O Bus	Memory	Optane memory support	Release date	Part number(s)	Release Price
8280M	SRF9Q (B1)	28 (56)	2.70 GHz	4.00 GHz	28 x 1 MB	39 MB	205W	LGA3647	3 UPI	6 x DDR4-2933	Yes	April 2, 2019	CD8069504228101	$13,012
8280L	SRF9R (B1)	28 (56)	2.70 GHz	4.00 GHz	28 x 1 MB	39 MB	205W	LGA3647	3 UPI	6 x DDR4-2933	Yes	April 2, 2019	CD8069504228201	$17,906
8280	SRF9P (B1)	28 (56)	2.70 GHz	4.00 GHz	28 x 1 MB	39 MB	205W	LGA3647	3 UPI	6 x DDR4-2933	Yes	April 2, 2019	CD8069504228001	$10,009
8276M	SRF98 (B1)	28 (56)	2.20 GHz	4.00 GHz	28 x 1 MB	39 MB	165W	LGA3647	3 UPI	6 x DDR4-2933	Yes	April 2, 2019	CD8069504195401	$11,722
8276L	SRF97 (B1)	28 (56)	2.20 GHz	4.00 GHz	28 x 1 MB	39 MB	165W	LGA3647	3 UPI	6 x DDR4-2933	Yes	April 2, 2019	CD8069504195301	$16,616
8276	SRF99 (B1)	28 (56)	2.20 GHz	4.00 GHz	28 x 1 MB	39 MB	165W	LGA3647	3 UPI	6 x DDR4-2933	Yes	April 2, 2019	CD8069504195501	$8,719
8270	SRF96 (B1)	26 (52)	2.70 GHz	4.00 GHz	26 x 1 MB	36 MB	205W	LGA3647	3 UPI	6 x DDR4-2933	Yes	April 2, 2019	CD8069504195201	$7,405
8268	SRF95 (B1)	24 (48)	2.90 GHz	3.90 GHz	24 x 1 MB	36 MB	205W	LGA3647	3 UPI	6 x DDR4-2933	Yes	April 2, 2019	CD8069504195101	$6,302
8260Y	SRF9F (B1)	24 (48)	2.40 GHz	3.90 GHz	24 x 1 MB	36 MB	165W	LGA3647	3 UPI	6 x DDR4-2933	Yes	April 2, 2019	CD8069504200902	$5,320
8260M	SRF9J (B1)	24 (48)	2.40 GHz	3.90 GHz	24 x 1 MB	36 MB	165W	LGA3647	3 UPI	6 x DDR4-2933	Yes	April 2, 2019	CD8069504201201	$7,705
8260L	SRF9G (B1)	24 (48)	2.40 GHz	3.90 GHz	24 x 1 MB	36 MB	165W	LGA3647	3 UPI	6 x DDR4-2933	Yes	April 2, 2019	CD8069504201001	$12,599
8260	SRF9H (B1)	24 (48)	2.40 GHz	3.90 GHz	24 x 1 MB	36 MB	165W	LGA3647	3 UPI	6 x DDR4-2933	Yes	April 2, 2019	CD8069504201101	$4,702
8256	SRF94 (B1)	4 (8)	3.80 GHz	3.90 GHz	4 x 1 MB	17 MB	105W	LGA3647	3 UPI	6 x DDR4-2933	Yes	April 2, 2019	CD8069504194701 BX806958256	$7,007
8253	SRF93 (B1)	16 (32)	2.20 GHz	3.00 GHz	16 x 1 MB	22 MB	125W	LGA3647	3 UPI	6 x DDR4-2933	Yes	April 2, 2019	CD8069504194601	$3,115

==== Xeon Gold 6200 series ====
Bolded denotes new SKUs released February 24, 2020.

Model number	sSpec number	Cores (threads)	Frequency	Turbo Boost	L2 Cache	L3 Cache	TDP	Socket	I/O Bus	Memory	Optane memory support	Release date	Part number(s)	Release price
6262V	SRFQ4 (B1)	24 (48)	1.90 GHz	3.60 GHz	24 x 1 MB	33 MB	135W	LGA3647	3 UPI	6 x DDR4-2400	Yes	Q2, 2019	CD8069504285004	$2,900
6262		24 (48)	1.90 GHz	3.60 GHz		33 MB	135W	LGA3647	2 UPI	6 x DDR4-2400	Yes	Q2, 2019		
**6258R**	**SRGZF (B1)**	**28 (56)**	**2.70 GHz**	**4.00 GHz**		**39 MB**	**205W**	LGA3647	**2 UPI**	6 x DDR4-2933	Yes	**February 24, 2020**	**CD8069504449301**	**$3,950**
**6256**	**SRGTQ (B1)**	**12 (24)**	**3.60 GHz**	**4.50 GHz**		**33 MB**	**205W**	LGA3647	3 UPI	6 x DDR4-2933	Yes	**February 24, 2020**	**CD8069504425301**	**$3,900**
6254	SRF92 (B1)	18 (36)	3.10 GHz	4.00 GHz	18 x 1 MB	25 MB	200W	LGA3647	3 UPI	6 x DDR4-2933	Yes	April 2, 2019	CD8069504194501	$3,803
6252N	SRFPQ (B1)	24 (48)	2.30 GHz	3.60 GHz	24 x 1 MB	36 MB	150W	LGA3647	3 UPI	6 x DDR4-2933	Yes	Q2, 2019	CD8069504283503	$3,984
6252	SRF91 (B1)	24 (48)	2.10 GHz	3.70 GHz	24 x 1 MB	36 MB	150W	LGA3647	3 UPI	6 x DDR4-2933	Yes	April 2, 2019	CD8069504194401 BX806956252	$3,655
**6250L**	**SRH5D (B1)**	**8 (16)**	**3.90 GHz**	**4.50 GHz**		**36 MB**	**185W**	LGA3647	3 UPI	6 x DDR4-2933	Yes	**February 24, 2020**	**CD8069504497400**	**$6,404**
**6250**	**SRGTR (B1)**	**8 (16)**	**3.90 GHz**	**4.50 GHz**		**36 MB**	**185W**	LGA3647	3 UPI	6 x DDR4-2933	Yes	**February 24, 2020**	**CD8069504425402**	**$3,400**
**6248R**	**SRGZG (B1)**	**24 (48)**	**3.00 GHz**	**4.00 GHz**		**36 MB**	**205W**	LGA3647	**2 UPI**	6 x DDR4-2933	Yes	**February 24, 2020**	**CD8069504449401**	**$2,700**
6248	SRF90 (B1)	20 (40)	2.50 GHz	3.90 GHz	20 x 1 MB	28 MB	150W	LGA3647	3 UPI	6 x DDR4-2933	Yes	April 2, 2019	CD8069504194301 BX806956248	$3,072
**6246R**	**SRGZL (B1)**	**16 (32)**	**3.40 GHz**	**4.10 GHz**		**36 MB**	**205W**	LGA3647	**2 UPI**	6 x DDR4-2933	Yes	**February 24, 2020**	**CD8069504449801**	**$3,286**
6246	SRFPJ (B1)	12 (24)	3.30 GHz	4.20 GHz	12 x 1 MB	25 MB	165W	LGA3647	3 UPI	6 x DDR4-2933	Yes	Q2, 2019	CD8069504282905	$3,286
6244	SRF8Z (B1)	8 (16)	3.60 GHz	4.40 GHz	8 x 1 MB	25 MB	150W	LGA3647	3 UPI	6 x DDR4-2933	Yes	April 2, 2019	CD8069504194202	$2,925
**6242R**	**SRGZJ (B1)**	**20 (40)**	**3.10 GHz**	**4.10 GHz**		**36 MB**	**205W**	LGA3647	**2 UPI**	6 x DDR4-2933	Yes	**February 24, 2020**	**CD8069504449601**	**$2,529**
6242	SRF8Y (B1)	16 (32)	2.80 GHz	3.90 GHz	16 x 1 MB	22 MB	150W	LGA3647	3 UPI	6 x DDR4-2933	Yes	April 2, 2019	CD8069504194101 BX806956242	$2,529
6240Y	SRF9D (B1)	18 (36)	2.60 GHz	3.90 GHz	18 x 1 MB	25 MB	150W	LGA3647	3 UPI	6 x DDR4-2933	Yes	April 2, 2019	CD8069504200501	$2,726
**6240R**	**SRGZ8 (B1)**	**24 (48)**	**2.40 GHz**	**4.00 GHz**		**36 MB**	**165W**	LGA3647	**2 UPI**	6 x DDR4-2933	Yes	**February 24, 2020**	**CD8069504448600** **BX806956240R**	**$2,200**
6240M	SRFPZ (B1)	18 (36)	2.60 GHz	3.90 GHz	18 x 1 MB	25 MB	150W	LGA3647	3 UPI	6 x DDR4-2933	Yes	Q2, 2019	CD8069504284403	$5,448
6240L	SRFQ0 (B1)	18 (36)	2.60 GHz	3.90 GHz	18 x 1 MB	25 MB	150W	LGA3647	3 UPI	6 x DDR4-2933	Yes	Q2, 2019	CD8069504284503	$10,342
6240	SRF8W (B1)	18 (36)	2.60 GHz	3.90 GHz	18 x 1 MB	25 MB	150W	LGA3647	3 UPI	6 x DDR4-2933	Yes	April 2, 2019	CD8069504194001 BX806956240	$2,445
**6238R**	**SRGZ9 (B1)**	**28 (56)**	**2.20 GHz**	**4.00 GHz**		**39 MB**	**165W**	LGA3647	**2 UPI**	6 x DDR4-2933	Yes	**February 24, 2020**	**CD8069504448701** **BX806956238R**	**$2,612**
6238T	SRF9C (B1)	22 (44)	1.90 GHz	3.70 GHz	22 x 1 MB	30 MB	125W	LGA3647	3 UPI	6 x DDR4-2933	Yes	April 2, 2019	CD8069504200401	$2,742
6238M	SRFQ1 (B1)	22 (44)	2.10 GHz	3.70 GHz	22 x 1 MB	30 MB	140W	LGA3647	3 UPI	6 x DDR4-2933	Yes	Q2, 2019	CD8069504284604	$5,615
6238L	SRFQ2 (B1)	22 (44)	2.10 GHz	3.70 GHz	22 x 1 MB	30 MB	140W	LGA3647	3 UPI	6 x DDR4-2933	Yes	Q2, 2019	CD8069504284704	$10,510
6238	SRFPL (B1)	22 (44)	2.10 GHz	3.70 GHz	22 x 1 MB	30 MB	140W	LGA3647	3 UPI	6 x DDR4-2933	Yes	Q2, 2019	CD8069504283104 BX806956238	$2,612
6234	SRFPN (B1)	8 (16)	3.30 GHz	4.00 GHz	8 x 1 MB	25 MB	130W	LGA3647	3 UPI	6 x DDR4-2933	Yes	Q2, 2019	CD8069504283304 BX806956234	$2,214
6230T	SRFPS (B1)	20 (40)	2.10 GHz	3.90 GHz	20 x 1 MB	28 MB	125W	LGA3647	3 UPI	6 x DDR4-2933	Yes	Q2, 2019	CD8069504283704	$1,988
**6230R**	**SRGZA (B1)**	**26 (52)**	**2.10 GHz**	**4.00 GHz**		**36 MB**	**150W**	LGA3647	**2 UPI**	6 x DDR4-2933	Yes	**February 24, 2020**	**CD8069504448800** **BX806956230R**	**$1,894**
6230N	SRFPR (B1)	20 (40)	2.30 GHz	3.90 GHz	20 x 1 MB	28 MB	125W	LGA3647	3 UPI	6 x DDR4-2933	Yes	Q2, 2019	CD8069504202700	$2,046
6230	SRF8W (B1)	20 (40)	2.10 GHz	3.90 GHz	20 x 1 MB	28 MB	125W	LGA3647	3 UPI	6 x DDR4-2933	Yes	April 2, 2019	CD8069504193701 BX806956230	$1,894
**6226R**	**SRGZC (B1)**	**16 (32)**	**2.90 GHz**	**3.90 GHz**		**22 MB**	**150W**	LGA3647	**2 UPI**	6 x DDR4-2933	Yes	**February 24, 2020**	**CD8069504449000** **BX806956226R**	**$1,300**
6226	SRFPP (B1)	12 (24)	2.70 GHz	3.70 GHz	12 x 1 MB	19 MB	125W	LGA3647	3 UPI	6 x DDR4-2933	Yes	Q2, 2019	CD8069504283404	$1,776
6222V	SRFQ5 (B1)	20 (40)	1.80 GHz	3.60 GHz	20 x 1 MB	28 MB	115W	LGA3647	3 UPI	6 x DDR4-2400	Yes	Q2, 2019	CD8069504285204	$1,600
6222		20 (40)	1.80 GHz	3.60 GHz		28 MB	115W	LGA3647	2 UPI	6 x DDR4-2400	Yes	Q2, 2019		
6212U	SRF9A	24 (48)	2.40 GHz	3.90 GHz	16 x 1 MB	32 MB	165W	LGA3647	N/A	6 x DDR4-2933	Yes	April 2, 2019	CD8069504198002	$2000
**6210U**	**SRF9B**	**20 (40)**	**2.90 GHz**	**3.90 GHz**		**22 MB**	**150W**	LGA3647	N/A	**6 x DDR4-2933**	Yes	**February 24, 2020**	**CD8069504198101**	**$989**
**6208U**	**SRGZD (B1)**	**16 (32)**	**2.90 GHz**	**3.90 GHz**		**22 MB**	**150W**	LGA3647	N/A	**6 x DDR4-2933**	Yes	**February 24, 2020**	**CD8069504449101**	**$989**

==== Xeon Gold 5200 Series ====
Bolded denotes new SKUs released February 24, 2020.

Model number	sSpec number	Cores (threads)	Frequency	Turbo Boost	L2 Cache	L3 Cache	TDP	Socket	I/O Bus	Memory	Optane Memory supported	Release date	Part number(s)	Release price
5222	SRF8V (B1)	4 (8)	3.80 GHz	3.90 GHz	4 x 1 MB	17 MB	105W	LGA3647	2 UPI	6 x DDR4-2933	Yes	April 2, 2019	CD8069504193501	$1,221
5220T	SRFPK (B1)	18 (36)	1.90 GHz	3.90 GHz	18 x 1 MB	25 MB	105W	LGA3647	2 UPI	6 x DDR4-2666	Yes	Q2, 2019	CD8069504283006	$1,727
**5220R**	**SRGZP (B1)**	**24 (48)**	**2.20 GHz**	**4.00 GHz**		**36 MB**	**150W**	LGA3647	2 UPI	6 x DDR4-2666	Yes	**February 24, 2020**	**CD8069504451301** **BX806955220R**	**$1,555**
5220S	SRFPT (B1)	18 (36)	2.70 GHz	3.90 GHz	18 x 1 MB	25 MB	125W	LGA3647	2 UPI	6 x DDR4-2666	Yes	Q2, 2019	CD8069504283804	$2,000
5220	SRFBJ (L1)	18 (36)	2.20 GHz	3.90 GHz	18 x 1 MB	25 MB	125W	LGA3647	2 UPI	6 x DDR4-2666	Yes	April 2, 2019	CD8069504214601 BX806955220	$1,555
5218T	SRFPM (B1)	16 (32)	2.10 GHz	3.80 GHz	16 x 1 MB	22 MB	105W	LGA3647	2 UPI	6 x DDR4-2666	Yes	Q2, 2019	CD8069504283204	$1,349
**5218R**	**SRGZ7 (B1)**	**20 (40)**	**2.10 GHz**	**4.00 GHz**		**28 MB**	**125W**	LGA3647	2 UPI	6 x DDR4-2666	Yes	**February 24, 2020**	**CD8069504446300** **BX806955218R**	**$1,273**
5218N	SRFD9 (L1)	16 (32)	2.30 GHz	3.70 GHz	16 x 1 MB	22 MB	105W	LGA3647	2 UPI	6 x DDR4-2666	Yes	April 2, 2019	CD8069504289900	$1,375
5218B	SRFDJ (L1)	16 (32)	2.30 GHz	3.90 GHz	16 x 1 MB	22 MB	125W	LGA3647	2 UPI	6 x DDR4-2666	Yes	April 2, 2019	CD8069504295701	$1,273
5218	SRF8T (B1)	16 (32)	2.30 GHz	3.90 GHz	16 x 1 MB	22 MB	125W	LGA3647	2 UPI	6 x DDR4-2666	Yes	April 2, 2019	CD8069504193301 BX806955218	$1,273
5217	SRFBF (L1)	8 (16)	3.00 GHz	3.70 GHz	8 x 1 MB	11 MB	115W	LGA3647	2 UPI	6 x DDR4-2666	Yes	April 2, 2019	CD8069504214302	$1,522
5215M	SRFBD (L1)	10 (20)	2.50 GHz	3.40 GHz	10 x 1 MB	14 MB	85W	LGA3647	2 UPI	6 x DDR4-2666	Yes	April 2, 2019	CD8069504214102	$4,224
5215L	SRFBE (L1)	10 (20)	2.50 GHz	3.40 GHz	10 x 1 MB	14 MB	85W	LGA3647	2 UPI	6 x DDR4-2666	Yes	April 2, 2019	CD8069504214202	$9,119
5215	SRFBC (L1)	10 (20)	2.50 GHz	3.40 GHz	10 x 1 MB	13.75 MB	85W	LGA3647	2 UPI	6 x DDR4-2666	Yes	April 2, 2019	CD8069504214002	$1,221

==== Xeon Silver series ====
Bolded denotes new SKUs released February 24, 2020.

Model number	sSpec number	Cores (threads)	Frequency	Turbo Boost	L2 Cache	L3 Cache	TDP	Socket	I/O Bus	Memory	Optane Memory supported	Release date	Part number(s)	Release price
4216	SRFBB (L1)	16 (32)	2.10 GHz	3.20 GHz	16 x 1 MB	22 MB	100W	LGA3647	2 UPI	6 x DDR4-2400	No	April 2, 2019	CD8069504213901 BX806954216	$1,002
**4215R**	**SRGZE (B1)**	8 (16)	**3.20 GHz**	**4.00 GHz**		11 MB	**130W**	LGA3647	2 UPI	6 x DDR4-2400	Yes	**February 24, 2020**	**CD8069504449200**	**$794**
4215	SRFBA (L1)	8 (16)	2.50 GHz	3.50 GHz	8 x 1 MB	11 MB	85W	LGA3647	2 UPI	6 x DDR4-2400	Yes	April 2, 2019	CD8069504212701	$794
4214Y	SRFDG (L1)	12 (24)	2.20 GHz	3.20 GHz	12 x 1 MB	17 MB	85W	LGA3647	2 UPI	6 x DDR4-2400	No	April 2, 2019	CD8069504294401	$768
**4214R**	**SRG1W (L1)**	12 (24)	**2.40 GHz**	**3.50 GHz**		17 MB	**100W**	LGA3647	2 UPI	6 x DDR4-2400	No	**February 24, 2020**	**CD8069504343701** **BX806954214R**	**$694**
4214	SRFB9 (L1)	12 (24)	2.20 GHz	3.20 GHz	12 x 1 MB	17 MB	85W	LGA3647	2 UPI	6 x DDR4-2400	No	April 2, 2019	CD8069504212601 BX806954214	$694
**4210T**	**SRGYH (R1)**	10 (20)	**2.30 GHz**	3.20 GHz		14 MB	**95W**	LGA3647	2 UPI	6 x DDR4-2400	No	**February 24, 2020**	**CD8069504444900**	**$555**
**4210R**	**SRG24 (R1)**	10 (20)	**2.40 GHz**	3.20 GHz		14 MB	**100W**	LGA3647	2 UPI	6 x DDR4-2400	No	**February 24, 2020**	**CD8069504344500** **BX806954210R**	**$501**
4210	SRFBL (R1)	10 (20)	2.20 GHz	3.20 GHz	10 x 1 MB	14 MB	85W	LGA3647	2 UPI	6 x DDR4-2400	No	April 2, 2019	CD8069503956302 BX806954210	$501
4209T	SRFBQ (R1)	8 (16)	2.20 GHz	3.20 GHz	8 x 1 MB	11 MB	70W	LGA3647	2 UPI	6 x DDR4-2400	No	April 2, 2019	CD8069503956900	$501
4208	SRFBM (R1)	8 (16)	2.10 GHz	3.20 GHz	8 x 1 MB	11 MB	85W	LGA3647	2 UPI	6 x DDR4-2400	No	April 2, 2019	CD8069503956401 BX806954208	$417

==== Xeon Bronze series ====
Bolded denotes new SKUs released February 24, 2020.

Model number	sSpec number	Cores (threads)	Frequency	Turbo Boost	L2 Cache	L3 Cache	TDP	Socket	I/O Bus	Memory	Optane Memory supported	Release date	Part number(s)	Release price
**3206R**	**SRG25 (R1)**	**8 (8)**	1.90 GHz	N/A		**11 MB**	85W	LGA3647	2 UPI	6 x DDR4-2133	No	**February 24, 2020**	**CD8069504344600** **BX806953206R**	**$306**
3204	SRFBP (R1)	6 (6)	1.90 GHz	N/A	6 x 1 MB	8.25 MB	85W	LGA3647	2 UPI	6 x DDR4-2133	No	April 2, 2019	CD8069503956700 BX806953204	$213

=== Cascade Lake-W (Workstation) ===
==== Xeon W-3200 series ====
Model number	sSpec number	Cores (threads)	Frequency	Turbo Boost 2.0	Turbo Boost Max 3.0	L3 cache	TDP	Socket	Memory	Release date	Part number(s)	Release price
3275M	SRFFK (B1)	28 (56)	2.50 GHz	4.40 GHz	4.60 GHz	38.5 MB	205W	LGA3647	6 x DDR4-2933	Q2 2019	CD8069504248702	$7,453
3275	SRFFF (B1)	28 (56)	2.50 GHz	4.40 GHz	4.60 GHz	38.5 MB	205W	LGA3647	6 x DDR4-2933	Q2 2019	CD8069504153101	$4,449
3265M	SRFFJ (B1)	24 (48)	2.70 GHz	4.40 GHz	4.60 GHz	33 MB	205W	LGA3647	6 x DDR4-2933	Q2 2019	CD8069504248601	$6,353
3265	SRFFE (B1)	24 (48)	2.70 GHz	4.40 GHz	4.60 GHz	33 MB	205W	LGA3647	6 x DDR4-2933	Q2 2019	CD8069504153002	$3,349
3245M	SRFFH (B1)	16 (32)	3.20 GHz	4.40 GHz	4.60 GHz	22 MB	205W	LGA3647	6 x DDR4-2933	Q2 2019	CD8069504248501	$5,002
3245	SRFFD (B1)	16 (32)	3.20 GHz	4.40 GHz	4.60 GHz	22 MB	205W	LGA3647	6 x DDR4-2933	Q2 2019	CD8069504152900	$1,999
3235	SRFFC (B1)	12 (24)	3.30 GHz	4.40 GHz	4.50 GHz	19.25 MB	180W	LGA3647	6 x DDR4-2933	Q2 2019	CD8069504152802	$1,398
3225	SRFFB (B1)	8 (16)	3.70 GHz	4.30 GHz	4.40 GHz	16.5 MB	160W	LGA3647	6 x DDR4-2666	Q2 2019	CD8069504152705	$1,199
3223	SRFFG (B1)	8 (16)	3.50 GHz	4.00 GHz	4.20 GHz	16.5 MB	160W	LGA3647	6 x DDR4-2666	Q2 2019	CD8069504248402	$749

==== Xeon W-2200 series ====
Model number	sSpec number	Cores (threads)	Frequency	Turbo Boost 2.0	Turbo Boost Max 3.0	L2 cache	L3 cache	I/O Bus	Memory	TDP	Socket	Release date	Part number(s)	Price (USD)
Xeon W-2295	SRGSL (L1)	18 (36)	3.0 GHz	4.6 GHz	4.8 GHz	1 MB per core	24.75 MB	N/A	4 x DDR4-2933	165 W	LGA2066	Q4'19	CD8069504393000	$1333
Xeon W-2275	SRGSP (L1)	14 (28)	3.3 GHz	4.6 GHz	4.8 GHz	1 MB per core	19.25 MB	N/A	4 x DDR4-2933	165 W	LGA2066	Q4'19	CD8069504393300	$1112
Xeon W-2265	SRGSQ (L1)	12 (24)	3.5 GHz	4.6 GHz	4.8 GHz	1 MB per core	19.25 MB	N/A	4 x DDR4-2933	165 W	LGA2066	Q4'19	CD8069504393400	$944
Xeon W-2255	SRGV8 (L1)	10 (20)	3.7 GHz	4.5 GHz	4.7 GHz	1 MB per core	19.25 MB	N/A	4 x DDR4-2933	165 W	LGA2066	Q4'19	CD8069504393600	$778
Xeon W-2245	SRH02 (L1)	8 (16)	3.9 GHz	4.5 GHz	4.7 GHz	1 MB per core	16.5 MB	N/A	4 x DDR4-2933	155 W	LGA2066	Q4'19	CD8069504393801	$667
Xeon W-2235	SRGVA (L1)	6 (12)	3.8 GHz	4.6 GHz	N/A	1 MB per core	8.25 MB	N/A	4 x DDR4-2933	130 W	LGA2066	Q4'19	CD8069504439102 BX80695W2235	$555
Xeon W-2225	SRH03 (L1)	4 (8)	4.1 GHz	4.6 GHz	N/A	1 MB per core	8.25 MB	N/A	4 x DDR4-2933	105 W	LGA2066	Q4'19	CD8069504394102	$444
Xeon W-2223	SRGSX (L1)	4 (8)	3.6 GHz	3.9 GHz	N/A	1 MB per core	8.25 MB	N/A	4 x DDR4-2666	120 W	LGA2066	Q4'19	CD8069504394701 BX80695W2223	$297

== See also ==
- List of Intel Cascade Lake-based Xeon microprocessors

Atom (ULV)		Node name	Pentium/Core						
Microarch.	Step	Node name	Microarch.	Step					
		600 nm	P6	Pentium Pro (133 MHz)					
		500 nm	P6	Pentium Pro (150 MHz)					
		350 nm	P6	Pentium Pro (166–200 MHz)					
		350 nm	P6	Klamath					
		250 nm	P6	Deschutes					
		250 nm	P6	Katmai	NetBurst				
		180 nm	P6	Coppermine	Willamette				
		130 nm	P6	Tualatin	Northwood				
		130 nm	Pentium M	Banias	Northwood		NetBurst(HT)		NetBurst(×2)
		90 nm	Pentium M	Dothan	Prescott	⇨	Prescott‑2M	⇨	Smithfield
		90 nm	Pentium M	Dothan	~~Tejas~~	→	⇩	→	~~Cedarmill (Tejas)~~
		65 nm	Pentium M	Yonah	~~Nehalem (NetBurst)~~		Cedar Mill	⇨	Presler
		65 nm	Core	Merom	4 cores on mainstream desktop, DDR3 introduced				
Bonnell	Bonnell	45 nm	Core	Penryn					
Bonnell	Bonnell	45 nm	Nehalem	Nehalem	HT reintroduced, integrated MC, PCH; L3-cache introduced, 256 KB L2-cache/core				
Bonnell	Saltwell	32 nm	Nehalem	Westmere	Introduced GPU on same package and AES-NI				
Bonnell	Saltwell	32 nm	Sandy Bridge	Sandy Bridge	On-die ring bus, no more non-UEFI motherboards				
Silvermont	Silvermont	22 nm	Sandy Bridge	Ivy Bridge					
Silvermont	Silvermont	22 nm	Haswell	Haswell	Fully integrated voltage regulator				
Silvermont	Airmont	14 nm	Haswell	Broadwell					
Silvermont	Airmont	14 nm	Skylake	Skylake	DDR4 introduced on mainstream desktop				
Goldmont		14 nm	Skylake	Kaby Lake					
Goldmont		14 nm	Skylake	Coffee Lake	6 cores on mainstream desktop				
Goldmont		14 nm	Skylake	Amber Lake	Mobile-only				
Goldmont Plus		14 nm	Skylake	Whiskey Lake	Mobile-only				
Goldmont Plus		14 nm	Skylake	Coffee Lake Refresh	8 cores on mainstream desktop				
Goldmont Plus		14 nm	Skylake	Comet Lake	10 cores on mainstream desktop				
Goldmont Plus		14 nm	Sunny Cove	Cypress Cove (Rocket Lake)	Backported Sunny Cove microarchitecture for 14 nm				
Tremont		10 nm	Skylake	Palm Cove (Cannon Lake)	Mobile-only				
Tremont		10 nm	Sunny Cove	Sunny Cove (Ice Lake)	512 KB L2-cache/core				
Tremont		10 nm	Sunny Cove	Willow Cove (Tiger Lake)	X^{e} graphics engine				
Gracemont		Intel 7 (10 nm ESF)	Golden Cove	Golden Cove (Alder Lake)	Hybrid, DDR5, PCIe 5.0				
Gracemont		Intel 7 (10 nm ESF)	Golden Cove	Raptor Cove (Raptor Lake)					
Crestmont		Intel 4	Redwood Cove	Meteor Lake	Mobile-only; NPU, chiplet architecture				
Crestmont		Intel 3	Redwood Cove	Arrow Lake-U					
Skymont		TSMC N3B	Lion Cove	Lunar Lake	Low power mobile only (9–30 W)				
Skymont		TSMC N3B	Lion Cove	Arrow Lake					
Darkmont		Intel 18A	Cougar Cove	Panther Lake					
Arctic Wolf		Intel 18A and/or TSMC N2P	Coyote Cove	Nova Lake					
