= DL Boost =

Marketing name by Intel

Intel's Deep Learning Boost (DL Boost) is a marketing name for instruction set architecture (ISA) features on the x86-64 designed to improve performance on deep learning tasks such as training and inference.

== Features ==
DL Boost consists of two sets of features:

- AVX-512 VNNI, 4VNNIW, or AVX-VNNI: fast multiply-accumulation mainly for convolutional neural networks.
- AVX-512 BF16: lower-precision bfloat16 floating-point numbers for generally faster computation. Operations provided include conversion to/from float32 and dot product.

DL Boost features were introduced in the Cascade Lake architecture.

A TensorFlow-based benchmark run on the Google Cloud Platform Compute Engine shows improved performance and reduced cost compared to previous CPUs and to GPUs, especially for small batch sizes.
