= CPU socket =

Circuit board-microprocessor connection

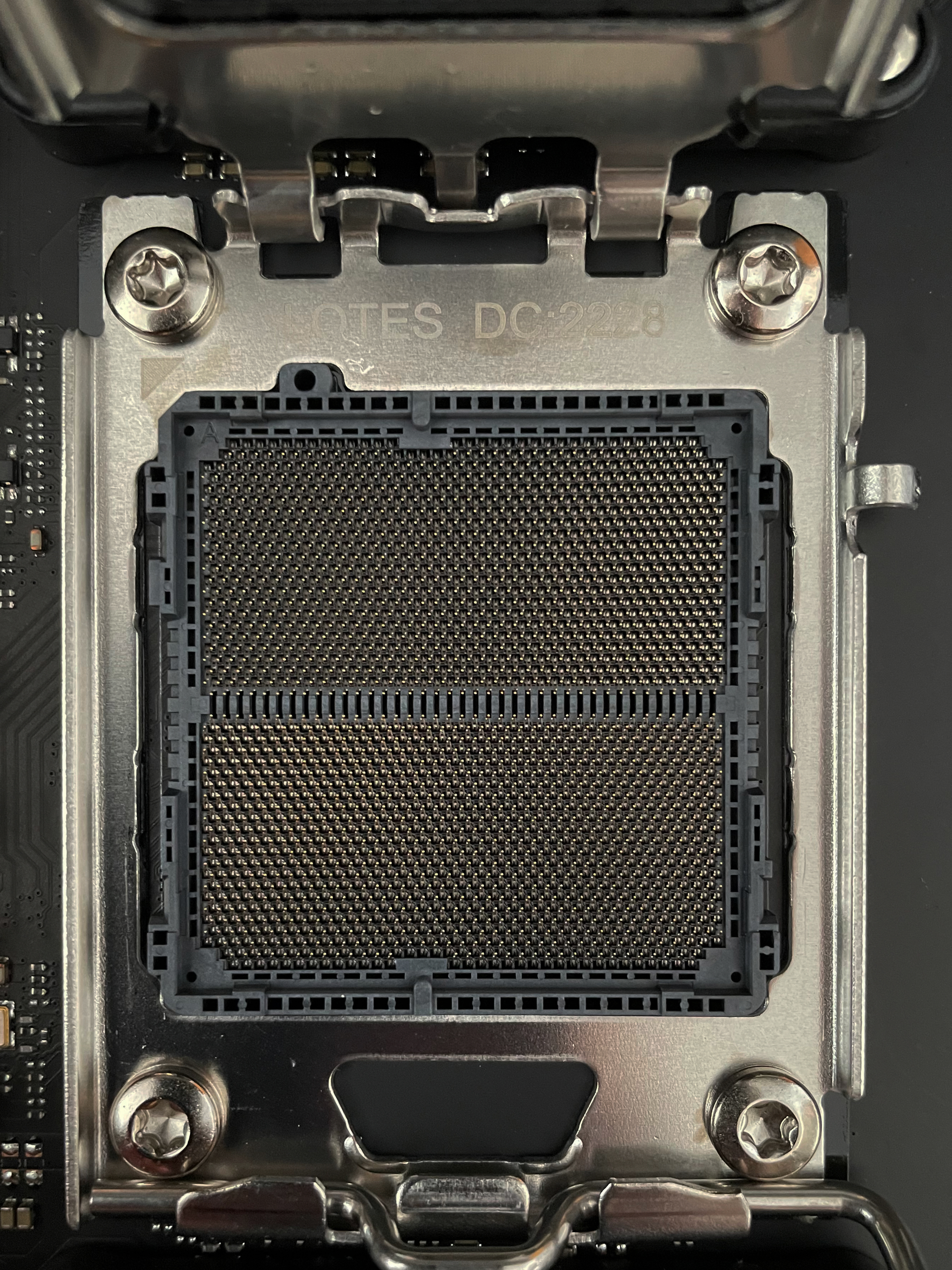
Socket AM5, a land grid array socket

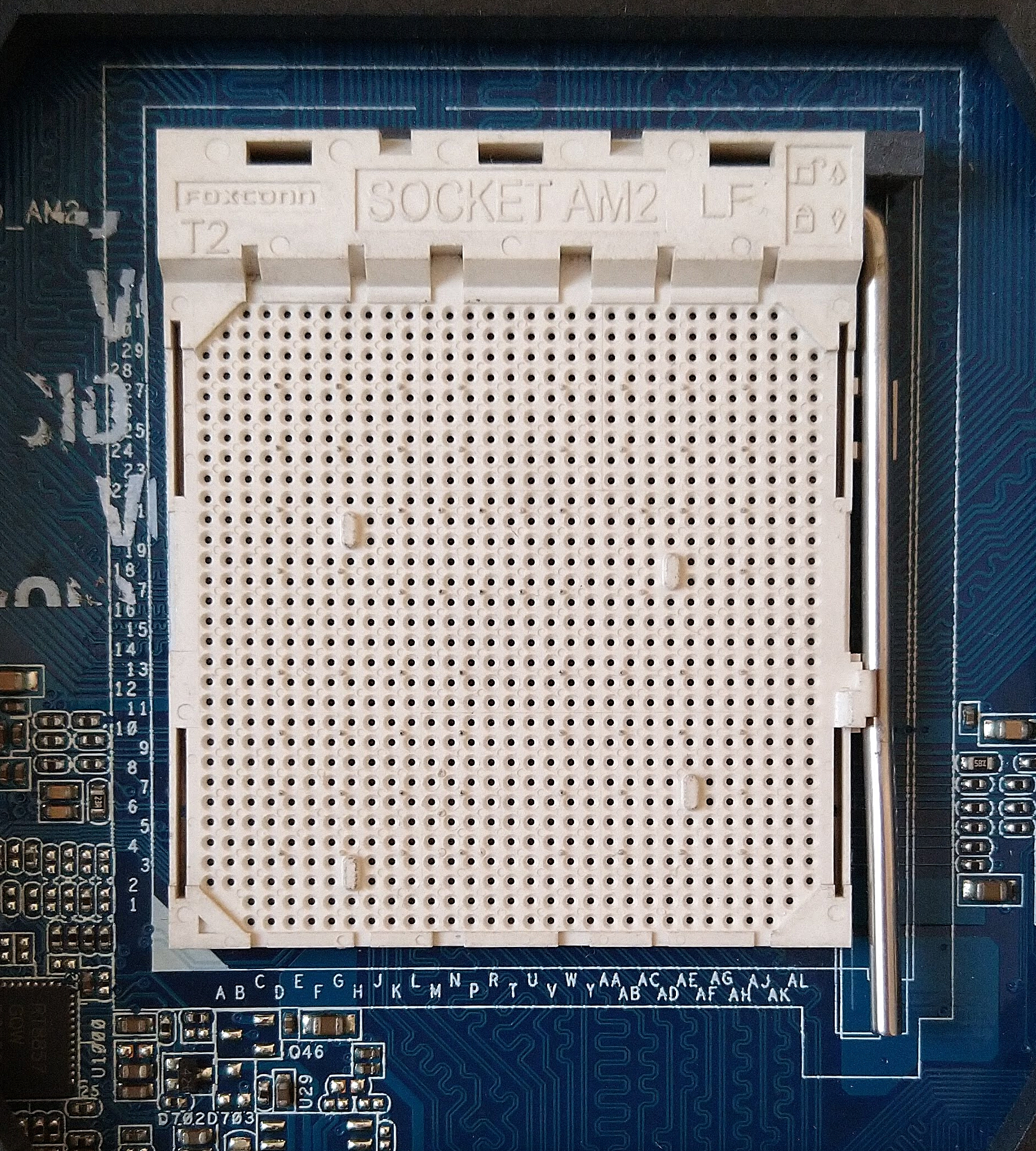
Socket AM2+, a pin grid array socket

In computer hardware, a CPU socket or CPU slot contains one or more mechanical components providing mechanical and electrical connections between a microprocessor and a printed circuit board (PCB). This allows for placing and replacing the central processing unit (CPU) without soldering.

Common sockets have retention clips that apply a constant force, which must be overcome when a device is inserted. For chips with many pins, zero insertion force (ZIF) sockets are preferred. Common sockets include pin grid array (PGA) or land grid array (LGA). These designs apply a compression force once either a handle (PGA type) or a surface plate (LGA type) is put into place. This provides superior mechanical retention while avoiding the risk of bending pins when inserting the chip into the socket.

CPU sockets are used on the motherboard in desktop and server computers. Because they allow easy swapping of components, they are also used for prototyping new circuits. Laptops typically use surface-mount CPUs, which take up less space on the motherboard than a socketed part.

As the pin density increases in modern sockets, increasing demands are placed on the printed circuit board fabrication technique, which permits the large number of signals to be successfully routed to nearby components. Likewise, within the chip carrier, the wire bonding technology also becomes more demanding with increasing pin counts and pin densities. Each socket technology will have specific reflow soldering requirements. As CPU and memory frequencies increase, above 30 MHz or thereabouts, electrical signalling increasingly shifts to differential signaling over parallel buses, bringing a new set of signal integrity challenges. The evolution of the CPU socket amounts to a coevolution of all these technologies in tandem.

Modern CPU sockets are almost always designed in conjunction with a heat sink mounting system, or, in lower power devices, other thermal considerations.

== Function ==
A CPU socket is made of plastic, and often comes with a lever or latch, and with metal contacts for each of the pins or lands on the CPU. Many packages are keyed to ensure the proper insertion of the CPU. CPUs with a PGA (pin grid array) package are inserted into the socket and, if included, the latch is closed. CPUs with an LGA (land grid array) package are inserted into the socket, the latch plate is flipped into position atop the CPU, and the lever is lowered and locked into place, pressing the CPU's contacts firmly against the socket's lands and ensuring a good connection, as well as increased mechanical stability.

== List ==
=== 80x86 ===
Table legend:

Intel only
AMD only

Socket name	Year of introduction	CPU families supported	Computer type	Package	Pin count	Pin pitch (mm)	Bus clock & transfers	Notes
DIP	1970s	Intel 8086; Intel 8088		DIP	40	2.54	5/10 MHz	
PLCC	1982	Intel 80186; Intel 80286; Intel 80386		PLCC	68 to 132	1.27	6–40 MHz	1982 for this use
PGA68	1982	Intel 80286		PGA	68			
PGA132	1985	Intel 80386		PGA	132			
PGA168	1989	Intel 80486; AMD 486; Cyrix 486		PGA	168	2.54	16–50 MHz	Sometimes referred to as Socket 0 or Socket 486
Socket 1	1989	Intel 80486; AMD 486; AMD 5x86 Cyrix 486; Cyrix 5x86		PGA	169	2.54	16–50 MHz	
Socket 2	1990s	Intel 80486; Intel Pentium OverDrive (P24T); Intel DX4; AMD 486; AMD 5x86 Cyrix 486; Cyrix 5x86		PGA	238	2.54	16–50 MHz	
Socket 3	1991	Intel 80486; Intel Pentium OverDrive (P24T); Intel DX4; AMD 486; AMD 5x86 Cyrix 486; Cyrix 5x86 IBM Blue Lightning		PGA	237	2.54	16–50 MHz (Note: Some late model Socket 3 motherboards unofficially supported FSB speeds up to 66MHz)	
Socket 4	1993	Intel Pentium		PGA	273	?	60–100 MHz	
Socket 5	1994	Intel Pentium; AMD K5; Cyrix 6x86 IDT WinChip C6; IDT WinChip 2		PGA	320	?	50–100 MHz	
Socket 6	?	Intel 80486		PGA	235	?	?	Designed but not used
Socket 463/ Socket NexGen	1994	NexGen Nx586		PGA	463	?	37.5–66 MHz	
Socket 7	1995	Intel Pentium; Intel Pentium MMX; AMD K6		PGA	321	?	50–66 MHz	It is possible to use Socket 7 processors in a Socket 5. An adapter is required, or if one is careful, a socket 7 can be pulled off its pins and put onto a socket 5 board, allowing the use of socket 7 processors.
Socket 8	1995	Intel Pentium Pro		PGA	387	?	60–66 MHz	
Slot 1	1997	Intel Pentium II; Intel Pentium III	Desktop	Slot	242	?	66–133 MHz	Celeron (Covington, Mendocino); Pentium II (Klamath, Deschutes); Pentium III (Katmai)- all versions Pentium III (coppermine)
Super Socket 7	1998	AMD K6-2; AMD K6-III; Rise mP6; Cyrix MII		PGA	321	?	66–100 MHz	Backward compatible with Socket 5 and Socket 7 processors.
Slot 2	1998	Intel Pentium II Xeon; Intel Pentium III Xeon	Server	Slot	330	?	100–133 MHz	
Socket 615	1999	Intel Mobile Pentium II; Intel Mobile Celeron	Notebook	PGA	615	?	66 MHz	
Slot A	1999	AMD Athlon	Desktop	Slot	242	?	100 MHz	
Socket 370	1999	Intel Pentium III; Intel Celeron; VIA Cyrix III; VIA C3	Desktop	PGA	370	1.27	66–133 MHz	
Socket A/ Socket 462	2000	AMD Athlon; AMD Duron; AMD Athlon XP; AMD Athlon XP-M; AMD Athlon MP; AMD Sempron	Desktop	PGA	462	?	100–200 MHz; 400 MT/s (Note: This is a double data rate bus. FSB in the later models.)	
Socket 423	2000	Intel Pentium 4	Desktop	PGA	423	1	100 MHz; 400 MT/s	Willamette core only. Can accept some of Socket 478 CPU with an adapter
Socket 495	2000	Intel Celeron; Intel Pentium III	Notebook	PGA	495	1.27	66–133 MHz	
Socket 603	2001	Intel Xeon	Server	PGA	603	1.27	100–133 MHz; 400–533 MT/s	
Socket 478/ Socket N	2001	Intel Pentium 4 Intel Celeron; Intel Pentium 4 EE; Intel Pentium 4 M	Desktop	PGA	478	1.27	100–200 MHz; 400–800 MT/s	
Socket 563	2002	AMD Athlon XP-M	Notebook	PGA	563	?	333 MHz	
Socket 604	2002	Intel Xeon	Server	PGA	604	1.27	100–266 MHz; 400–1066 MT/s	
Socket 754	2003	AMD Athlon 64; AMD Sempron; AMD Turion 64	Desktop	PGA	754	1.27	200–800 MHz	
Socket 940	2003	AMD Opteron; AMD Athlon 64 FX	Desktop; Server	PGA	940	1.27	200–1000 MHz	
Socket 479	2003	Intel Pentium M Intel Celeron M	Notebook	PGA	479	?	100–133 MHz; 400–533 MT/s	
Socket 939	2004	AMD Athlon 64; AMD Athlon 64 FX; AMD Athlon 64 X2; AMD Opteron	Desktop	PGA	939	1.27	200–1000 MHz	Support of Athlon 64 FX to 1 GHz; Support of Opteron limited to 100-series only
LGA 775/ Socket T	2004	Intel Pentium 4 Intel Pentium D Intel Celeron; Intel Celeron D Intel Pentium XE; Intel Core 2 Duo; Intel Core 2 Quad; Intel Xeon	Desktop	LGA	775	1.09 x 1.17	1600 MHz	Can accept LGA 771 CPU with slight modification and use of an adapter
Socket M	2006	Intel Core Solo; Intel Core Duo; Intel Dual-Core Xeon; Intel Core 2 Duo	Notebook	PGA	478	?	133–166 MHz; 533–667 MT/s	Replaces Socket 479
LGA 771/ Socket J	2006	Intel Xeon	Server	LGA	771	1.09 x 1.17	1600 MHz	See LGA 775/Socket T above
Socket S1	2006	AMD Turion 64 X2	Notebook	PGA	638	1.27	200–800 MHz	
Socket AM2	2006	AMD Athlon 64; AMD Athlon 64 X2	Desktop	PGA	940	1.27	200–1000 MHz	Replaces Socket 754 and Socket 939
Socket F/ Socket L (Socket 1207FX)	2006	AMD Athlon 64 FX; AMD Opteron (Socket L only support Athlon 64 FX)	Desktop; Server	LGA	1207	1.1	Socket L: 1000 MHz in Single CPU mode, 2000 MHz in Dual CPU mode	Replaces Socket 940; Socket L was intended for enthusiasts who wanted server power in a desktop PC. It is just a re-branded Socket F that doesn't need special RAM, and may have only been used in the Asus L1N64-SLI WS Motherboard.
Socket AM2+	2007	AMD Athlon 64; AMD Athlon X2; AMD Phenom; AMD Phenom II	Desktop	PGA	940	1.27	200–2600 MHz	Separated power planes Replaces Socket AM2; AM2+ Pkg. CPUs can work in Socket AM2; AM2 Pkg. CPUs can work in Socket AM2+
Socket P	2007	Intel Core 2	Notebook	PGA	478	?	133–266 MHz; 533–1066 MT/s	Replaces Socket M
LGA 1366/ Socket B	2008	Intel Core i7 (900 series); Intel Xeon (35xx, 36xx, 55xx, 56xx series)	Desktop; Server	LGA	1366	?	4.8–6.4 GT/s	Replaces Socket J (LGA 771) in the entry level.
Socket AM3	2009	AMD Phenom II; AMD Athlon II; AMD Sempron; AMD Opteron (1300 series)	Desktop	PGA	941	1.27	200–3200 MHz	Separated power planes Replaces Socket AM2+ AM3 Pkg. CPUs can work in Socket AM2/AM2+ Sempron 140 only
rPGA 988A/ Socket G1	2009	Intel Clarksfield; Intel Arrandale	Notebook	rPGA	988	1	2.5 GT/s	Replaces Socket P
LGA 1156/ Socket H	2009	Intel Nehalem (1st gen); Intel Westmere	Desktop	LGA	1156	?	2.5 GT/s	DMI bus is a (perhaps modified) PCIe x4 v1.1 interface
Socket G34	2010	AMD Opteron (6000 series)	Server	LGA	1974	?	200–3200 MHz	Replaces Socket F
Socket C32	2010	AMD Opteron (4000 series)	Server	LGA	1207	?	200–3200 MHz	Replaces Socket F, Socket AM3
LGA 1567/ Socket LS	2010	Intel Xeon 6500/7500-series	Server	LGA	1567	?	4.8–6.4 GT/s	
LGA 1155/ Socket H2	2011/Q1; 2011.01.09	Intel Sandy Bridge (2nd gen); Intel Ivy Bridge (3rd gen)	Desktop	LGA	1155	?	5.7 GT/s	used for Intel 2nd generation, 3rd generation processors. Sandy Bridge supports 20 PCIe 2.0 lanes. Ivy Bridge supports 40 PCIe 3.0 lanes. Intel Mainstream Socket.
LGA 2011/ Socket R	2011/Q3; 2011.11.14	Intel Core i7 3xxx Sandy Bridge-E; Intel Core i7 4xxx Ivy Bridge-E; Intel Xeon E5 2xxx/4xxx (Sandy Bridge EP) (2/4S); Intel Xeon E5-2xxx/4xxx v2 (Ivy Bridge EP) (2/4S)	Desktop; Server	LGA	2011	?	4.8–6.4 GT/s	Sandy Bridge-E/EP and Ivy Bridge-E/EP both support 40 PCIe 3.0 lanes. Using the Xeon focused 2011 socket gives also 4 memory Channels.
rPGA 988B/ Socket G2	2011	Intel Core i7 Intel Core i5 Intel Core i3 (2000, 3000 series)	Notebook	rPGA	988	1	2.5 GT/s, 4.8 GT/s	
Socket FM1	2011	AMD Llano Processors	Desktop	PGA	905	1.27	5.2 GT/s	used for 1st generation APUs
Socket FS1	2011	AMD Llano Processors	Notebook	PGA	722	1.27	3.2 GT/s	used for 1st generation Mobile APUs
Socket AM3+	2011	AMD FX Vishera; AMD FX Zambezi; AMD Phenom II; AMD Athlon II; AMD Sempron	Desktop	PGA	942 (CPU 71pin)	1.27	3.2 GT/s	
LGA 1356/ Socket B2	2012	Intel Xeon (E5 1400 & 2400 series)	Server	LGA	1356	?	3.2–4.0 GT/s	
Socket FM2	2012	AMD Trinity Processors	Desktop	PGA	904	1.27	?	used for 2nd generation APUs
LGA 1150/ Socket H3	2013	Intel Haswell (4th gen); Intel Haswell Refresh; Intel Broadwell (5th gen)	Desktop	LGA	1150	?	?	used for Intel's 4th generation (Haswell/Haswell Refresh), the handful of intel 5th generation processors
rPGA 946B/947/ Socket G3	2013	Intel Haswell	Notebook	rPGA	946	1	5.0 GT/s	
Socket FM2+	2014	AMD Kaveri; AMD Godavari	Desktop	PGA	906	1.27	?	Compatible with AMD APUs such as "Richland" and "Trinity"
Socket AM1	2014	AMD Athlon; AMD Sempron	Desktop	PGA	721	1.27	?	Compatible with AMD APUs such as "Kabini"
LGA 2011-v3	2014 (August and September)	Haswell-E; Haswell-EP	Desktop	LGA	2011	?	Up to 68 GB/sec. Depends on DDR4 speed and channel count.	Up to 40 PCIe 3.0 lanes. Up to 4 memory Channels.
LGA 1151/ Socket H4	2015	Intel Skylake (6th gen); Intel Kaby Lake (7th gen); Intel Coffee Lake (8th gen); Intel Coffee Lake Refresh (9th gen)	Desktop	LGA	1151	?	5 GT/s - 8 GT/s	used for Intel's 6th generation (Skylake), 7th generation (Kaby Lake), 8th generation (Coffee Lake) processors, and 9th generation (Coffee Lake Refresh) processors
LGA 3647	2016	Intel Xeon Phi; Intel Skylake-SP	Server	LGA	3647	?	?	used for Intel's Xeon Phi x200 and Xeon Scalable processors
Socket AM4	2016	AMD Athlon Bristol Ridge; AMD Athlon Raven Ridge 14nm AMD Athlon Picasso 12nm AMD Ryzen 1000 series AMD Ryzen 2000 series AMD Ryzen 3000 series AMD Ryzen 4000 series AMD Ryzen 5000 series	Desktop	PGA	1331	1	Depends on DDR4 speed	compatible with AMD Ryzen 9, Ryzen 7, Ryzen 5 & Ryzen 3 Zen based processors
Socket SP3	2017	AMD Epyc Naples; AMD Epyc Rome; AMD Epyc Milan	Server	LGA	4094	?	Depends on DDR4 speed	compatible with AMD Epyc processors
Socket TR4/ Socket SP3r2	2017	AMD Ryzen Threadripper (1000 series); AMD Ryzen Threadripper (2000 series)	Desktop	LGA	4094	?	Depends on DDR4 speed	compatible with AMD Ryzen Threadripper processors
LGA 2066/ Socket R4	2017	Intel Skylake-X; Intel Kaby Lake-X; Intel Cascade Lake-X	Desktop; Server	LGA	2066	?	?	Used for Intel's 7th generation (Skylake-X & Kaby Lake-X & Cascade Lake-X) series of Core-X processors
Socket sTRX4/ Socket SP3r3	2019	AMD Ryzen Threadripper (3000 series)	Desktop	LGA	4094	?	Depends on DDR4 speed	compatible with 3rd generation AMD Ryzen Threadripper processors
LGA 4189	2020	Intel Cooper Lake; Intel Ice Lake-SP	Desktop; Server	LGA	4189	0.99		
LGA 1200	2020	Intel Comet Lake (10th gen); Intel Rocket Lake (11th gen)	Desktop	LGA	1200			
LGA 1700	2021	Intel Alder Lake (12th gen); Intel Raptor Lake (13th gen); Intel Raptor Lake (14th gen)	Desktop	LGA	1700			
Socket sWRX8	2022	AMD Ryzen Threadripper Pro (5000 series)	Desktop	LGA	4094			
Socket AM5	2022	AMD Ryzen 7000 series AMD Ryzen 8000 series (APU); AMD Ryzen 9000 series	Desktop	LGA	1718			Zen 4 Ryzen CPUs
Socket SP5	2022	AMD Epyc Genoa	Server	LGA	6096			Used for Epyc Genoa and Milan
LGA 4677	2022	Intel Sapphire Rapids intel Emerald Rapids	Server	LGA	4677			
Socket SP6	2023	AMD Epyc Siena	Server	LGA	4844			
Socket sTR5	2023	AMD Ryzen Threadripper; AMD Ryzen Threadripper Pro (7000 series)	Desktop	LGA	4844			
LGA 1851	2024	Intel Meteor Lake-PS (Core Ultra Series 1); Intel Arrow Lake (Core Ultra 200S Series); TBA	Desktop	LGA	1851			
LGA 4710	2023	Intel Granite Rapids	Server	LGA	4710			
LGA 7529	2024	Intel Sierra Forest	Server	LGA	7529			
Socket name	Year of introduction	CPU families supported	Computer type	Package	Pin count	Pin pitch (mm)	Bus clock & transfers	Notes

=== Other ISAs ===
Socket name	Year of introduction	CPU families supported	Computer type	Package	Pin count	Pin pitch (mm)	Bus clock & transfers	Notes
Daughter Card	1995	PowerPC 601+	Desktop	Slot	146	?	40-60 Hz	
Socket 288	?	PowerPC 603+	Desktop	PGA	288	?	40-60 Hz	
Socket 431	1995	Alpha 21064/21064A	Desktop	PGA	431	?	12.5–66.67 MHz	
Socket 499	1997	Alpha 21164/21164A	Desktop	PGA	499	?	15–100 MHz	
Socket 587	1998	Alpha 21264	Desktop	PGA	587	?	12.5–133 MHz	
Slot B	1999	Alpha 21264/21264A	Desktop	Slot	587	?	100 MHz	
PAC418	2001	Intel Itanium	Server	PGA	418	?	133 MHz	
PAC611	2002	Intel Itanium 2 HP PA-8800, PA-8900	Server	PGA	611	?	200 MHz	
LGA 1248	2010	Intel Itanium 9300-series and up	Server	LGA	1248	?	4.8-6.4 GT/s	
Socket name	Year of introduction	CPU families supported	Computer type	Package	Pin count	Pin pitch (mm)	Bus clock & transfers	Notes

== Slotkets ==
Slotkets are special adapters for using socket processors in bus-compatible slot motherboards.

== See also ==
- List of AMD processors
- List of Intel processors
