= Clearwater Forest =

Intel Xeon 6+ E-core server processors, released in 2026

- Launched: June 1, 2026; 4 months ago
- Designed by: Intel
- Manufactured by: Intel
- Fabrication process: Intel 18A; Intel 3; Intel 7
- Platform(s): Server

Branding
- Brand name(s): Xeon
- Generation: Xeon 6+
- Socket(s): LGA 7529

Instructions and architecture
- Instructions set: x86-64
- Extensions: AVX, AVX2, FMA3, AES-NI
- P-core architecture: Darkmont (E-core)

Cores
- Peak core clock: Up to Up to 3.2 GHz
- L2 cache: 4 MB (shared per module)
- L3 cache: 576 MB (max)

Memory support
- Type: DDR5
- Memory channels: 12

I/O
- PCIe support: PCIe 5.0
- PCIe lanes: 96
- CXL support: CXL 2.0
- UPI links: Up to 6

History
- Predecessor: Sierra Forest
- Variant: Granite Rapids

Clearwater Forest is the codename for Intel's Xeon 6+ server processors, launched on June 1, 2026 at Computex. It is the first data center processor built on the Intel 18A process node. Clearwater Forest uses exclusively Darkmont E-cores (efficiency cores), with up to 288 cores per socket, targeting cloud-native, networking, and scale-out workloads. It succeeds Sierra Forest and shares I/O tiles with Granite Rapids.

All models support 2-socket configurations, 12 channels of DDR5-8000, 96 PCIe 5.0 lanes, 64 CXL 2.0 lanes, SGX, TDX, and built-in accelerators (QAT, DSA, DLB, IAA).

== List of Clearwater Forest processors ==
=== Clearwater Forest-AP ===
| Processor Family | Model | Cores (threads) | Clock rate (GHz) | | Cache L3 | Max. Scalability | Memory Support | TDP | Release date | MSRP (USD) |
| Processor Family | Model | Cores (threads) | Base | Turbo | Cache L3 | Max. Scalability | Memory Support | TDP | Release date | MSRP (USD) |
|---|---|---|---|---|---|---|---|---|---|---|
| Xeon 6+ | 6990E+ | 288 (288) | 2.2 | 3.2 | 576 MB | 2S | DDR5-8000 twelve-channel up to 1.5 TB | 450 W | June 1, 2026 | $14995 |
| Xeon 6+ | 6980E+ | 264 (264) | 2.1 | 3.2 | 528 MB | 2S | DDR5-8000 twelve-channel up to 1.5 TB | 400 W | June 1, 2026 | $9850 |
| Xeon 6+ | 6970E+ | 192 (192) | 2.3 | 3.2 | 480 MB | 2S | DDR5-8000 twelve-channel up to 1.5 TB | 400 W | June 1, 2026 | $7680 |
| Xeon 6+ | 6960E+ | 144 (144) | 2.4 | 3.2 | 432 MB | 2S | DDR5-8000 twelve-channel up to 1.5 TB | 330 W | June 1, 2026 | $4608 |

== See also ==
- List of Intel processors
- List of Intel Xeon processors
