= List of x86 virtualization instructions =

Instruction set extensions that have been added to the x86 instruction set in order to support hardware virtualization. These extensions provide instructions for entering and leaving a virtualized execution context and for loading virtual-machine control structures (VMCSs), which hold the state of the guest and host, along with fields which control processor behavior within the virtual machine.

== AMD-V instructions ==
Instruction	Opcode	Instruction Description	Used by	Added in
Basic SVM (Secure Virtual Machine) instructions
INVLPGA rAX,ECX (Note: For the rAX argument to the VMRUN, VMLOAD, VMSAVE, INVLPGA and PVALIDATE instructions, the choice of AX/EAX/RAX depends on address-size, which can be overridden with the 67h prefix.)	0F 01 DF	Invalidate TLB mappings for the virtual page specified in rAX and the ASID (Address Space IDentifier) specified in ECX.	VMM	K8 (Note: Support for AMD-V was added in stepping F of the AMD K8, and is not available on earlier steppings.)
VMRUN rAX	0F 01 D8	Run virtual machine managed by the VMCB (Virtual Machine Control Block) specified by physical address in rAX.	VMM	K8
VMLOAD rAX	0F 01 DA	Load a specific subset of processor state from the VMCB specified by the physical address in the rAX register. (Note: The VMRUN instruction will load only a limited subset of CPU state - VMLOAD should be run before VMRUN to load additional state. Similarly, #VMEXIT will store only a limited amount of guest state to the VMCB, and VMSAVE is needed to store additional state. For simple intercept conditions where the VMM doesn't need to make use of the state items handled by VMSAVE/VMLOAD, the VMM may improve performance by abstaining from performing VMSAVE/VMLOAD before re-entering the virtual machine with VMRUN.)	Usually the VMM (Note: On CPUs that support VMLOAD/VMSAVE virtualization (Excavator and later), the VMLOAD and VMSAVE instructions can be executed in guest mode as well.)	K8
VMSAVE rAX	0F 01 DB	Save a specific subset of processor state to the VMCB specified by the physical address in the rAX register.	Usually the VMM	K8
STGI	0F 01 DC	Set GIF (Global Interrupt Flag).	Usually the VMM (Note: On CPUs that support Virtual GIF (Excavator and later), the STGI and CLGI instructions can be executed in guest mode as well.)	K8
CLGI	0F 01 DD	Clear GIF.	Usually the VMM	K8
VMMCALL	NFx 0F 01 D9	Call to VM monitor from guest by causing a VMEXIT.	Guest	K8
SKINIT EAX	0F 01 DE	Secure Init and Jump with Attestation. Initializes CPU to known state, designates a 64 Kbyte memory area specified by EAX as an SLB ("Secure Loader Block"), submits a copy of the memory area to the system TPM for validation using a digital signature, then jumps into the SLB.	VMM	Turion "Lion", Opteron "Shanghai", Phenom II
Secure Encrypted Virtualization (SEV): Encrypted State (SEV-ES) instructions
VMGEXIT	F2/F3 0F 01 D9	SEV-ES Exit to VMM. Explicit communication with the VMM for SEV-ES VMs. (Note: VMGEXIT is executed as VMMCALL if not executed by a SEV-ES guest.)	Guest	Zen 1
Secure Nested Paging (SEV-SNP): Reverse-Map Table (RMP) instructions
PSMASH	F3 0F 01 FF	Page Smash: expands a 2MB-page RMP entry into a corresponding set of contiguous 4KB-page RMP entries. The 2 MB page's system physical address is specified in the RAX register.	VMM	Zen 3
RMPUPDATE	F2 0F 01 FE	Write a new RMP entry. The system physical address of a page whose RMP entry is modified is specified in the RAX register. The RCX register provides the effective address of a 16-byte data structure which contains the new RMP state.	VMM	Zen 3
PVALIDATE	F2 0F 01 FF	Validate or rescind validation of a guest page's RMP entry. The guest virtual address is specified in the register operand rAX.	Guest	Zen 3
RMPADJUST	F3 0F 01 FE	Adjust RMP permissions for a guest page. The guest virtual address is specified in the RAX register. The page size is specified in RCX[0]. The target VMPL (Virtual Machine Privilege Level) and its permissions are specified in the RDX register.	Guest	Zen 3
RMPQUERY	F3 0F 01 FD	Reads an RMP permission mask for a guest page. The guest virtual address is specified in the RAX register. The target VMPL is specified in RDX[7:0]. RMP permissions for the specified VMPL are returned in RDX[63:8] and the RCX register.	Guest	Zen 4
RMPREAD	F2 0F 01 FD	Read an RMP entry. The system physical address of the page whose RMP entry is to be read is specified in the RAX register. The RCX register provides the effective address of a 16-byte data structure that the RMP entry will be written to.	VMM	Zen 5
RMPCHKD	F3 0F 01 FC	Check RMP dirty status of a range of pages. The guest-physical address of the first page to check is specified in RAX and the number of pages to check is given in RCX. If any dirty pages were found, the instruction will set RFLAGS.ZF to 0, put the guest-physical address of the first dirty page in RAX, and a page-size indicator in RFLAGS.CF (0=4K, 1=2M). If no dirty pages are found, it sets RFLAGS.ZF to 1.	Guest	(Zen 6)
RMPOPT	F2 0F 01 FC	RMP optimization instruction. Takes a 1GB-aligned system-physical address in RAX and a function indicator in RCX (0=check whether all pages in a 1GB memory area belong to the hypervisor and set an RMPOPT table entry accordingly, 1=read an RMPOPT table entry. Both functions set RFLAGS.CF to 1 if the entire 1GB area is hypervisor-owned and 0 otherwise.)	VMM	(Zen 6)

== Intel VT-x instructions ==
Intel virtualization instructions. VT-x is also supported on some processors from VIA and Zhaoxin.

Instruction	Opcode	Instruction Description	Used by (Note: Executing any of the VT-x VMM instructions while within the VM guest will cause a VMEXIT. If VMX operation has not been entered through VMXON, then all of the VT-x instructions (except VMXON) will cause #UD.)	Added in
Basic VMX (Virtual Machine Extensions) instructions
VMXON m64 (Note: The m64 argument to VMPTRLD, VMPTRST, VMCLEAR and VMXON is a 64-bit physical address.)	F3 0F C7 /6	Enter VMX Operation – enters hardware supported virtualisation environment. (Note: The m64 argument to VMXON is the 64-bit physical address to a "VMXON region", which is a 4Kbyte region that must be 4 Kbyte aligned. This region may be used by the processor to support VMX operation in an implementation-dependent manner and should never be accessed by software until the processor has left VMX operation through the VMXOFF instruction. In systems with more than one logical CPU, entering VMX operation on more than one CPU requires a separate "VMXON region" for each CPU.)	VMM	Prescott 2M, Yonah, Centerton, VIA Nano 2000 (Note: On VIA Nano CPUs, VMX is only supported on stepping 3 and later.)
VMXOFF	NP 0F 01 C4	Leave VMX Operation – stops hardware supported virtualisation environment.	VMM	Prescott 2M, Yonah, Centerton, VIA Nano 2000
VMPTRLD m64	NP 0F C7 /6	Load pointer to Virtual-Machine Control Structure (VMCS) from memory and mark it valid.	VMM	Prescott 2M, Yonah, Centerton, VIA Nano 2000
VMPTRST m64	NP 0F C7 /7	Store pointer to current VMCS to memory.	VMM	Prescott 2M, Yonah, Centerton, VIA Nano 2000
VMCLEAR m64	66 0F C7 /6	Flush VMCS data from CPU to VMCS region in memory. If the specified VMCS is the current VMCS, then the current-VMCS is marked as invalid.	VMM	Prescott 2M, Yonah, Centerton, VIA Nano 2000
VMLAUNCH	NP 0F 01 C2	Launch virtual machine managed by current VMCS.	VMM	Prescott 2M, Yonah, Centerton, VIA Nano 2000
VMRESUME	NP 0F 01 C3	Resume virtual machine managed by current VMCS.	VMM	Prescott 2M, Yonah, Centerton, VIA Nano 2000
VMREAD r/m,reg	NP 0F 78 /r	Read a specified field from the current-VMCS. The reg argument specifies which field to read – the result is stored to r/m.	Usually the VMM (Note: If "VMCS Shadowing" is enabled (available on Haswell and later), the VMREAD and VMWRITE instructions can be executed by the guest as well.)	Prescott 2M, Yonah, Centerton, VIA Nano 2000
VMWRITE reg,r/m	NP 0F 79 /r	Write to specified field of current-VMCS. The reg argument specifies which field to write, and the r/m argument provides the data item to write to the field.	Usually the VMM	Prescott 2M, Yonah, Centerton, VIA Nano 2000
VMCALL	NP 0F 01 C1	Call to VM monitor from guest by causing a VMEXIT.	Usually the guest (Note: The VMCALL instruction can be executed by the VMM as well – doing so will cause a special SMM VM exit.)	Prescott 2M, Yonah, Centerton, VIA Nano 2000
Extended Page Tables (EPT) instructions
INVEPT reg,m128	66 0F 38 80 /r	Invalidates EPT-derived entries in the TLBs and paging-structure caches. The reg argument specifies an invalidation type, the memory argument specifies a 128-bit descriptor. (Note: The invalidation types available for the reg argument of INVEPT are: Value / Function; 1 / Single-context invalidation: invalidate all mappings associated with EPT-pointer in bits 63:0 of descriptor.; 2 / Global invalidation: invalidate all mappings associated with all EPT-pointers.)	VMM	Nehalem, Centerton, ZhangJiang
INVVPID reg,m128	66 0F 38 81 /r	Invalidates entries in the TLBs and paging-structure caches based on VPID (Virtual Processor ID). The reg argument specifies an invalidation type, the memory argument specifies a 128-bit descriptor. (Note: The invalidation types available for the reg argument of INVVPID are: Value / Function; 0 / Invalidate mapping for linear address and VPID specified in descriptor. (Unlike INVLPG, INVVPID will fail when used with non-canonical addresses.); 1 / Invalidate all mappings for VPID specified in descriptor.; 2 / All-contexts invalidation: invalidate all mappings for all VPIDs except VPID 0.; 3 / Invalidate all mappings for VPID specified in descriptor, except global translations.)	VMM	Nehalem, Centerton, ZhangJiang
VMFUNC	NP 0F 01 D4	Invoke VM function specified in EAX. (Note: The functions available for VMFUNC in the EAX register are: EAX / Function; 0 / EPTP switching: switch extended page table pointer to one of up to 512 table pointers prepared in advance by the VM host. ECX specifies which one of the 512 pointers to use.; 1-63 / (Reserved, will cause VMEXIT); ≥64 / Invalid, will cause #UD.)	Guest	Haswell, Silvermont, LuJiaZui
Trust Domain Extensions (TDX): Secure Arbitration Mode (SEAM) instructions
SEAMOPS	66 0F 01 CE	Invoke SEAM specific operations. Operation to perform is specified in RAX. (Note: The operations available for SEAMOPS in the RAX register are: RAX / Operation; 0 (CAPABILITIES) / Return bitmap of supported SEAMOPS leaves in RAX.; 1 (SEAMREPORT) / Generate SEAMREPORT structure.; Any unsupported value in RAX will cause a #GP(0) exception.)	SEAM root	(Sapphire Rapids), Emerald Rapids
SEAMRET	66 0F 01 CD	Return to legacy VMX root operation from SEAM VMX root operation.	SEAM root	(Sapphire Rapids), Emerald Rapids
SEAMCALL	66 0F 01 CF	Call to SEAM VMX root operation from legacy VMX root operation.	VMM	(Sapphire Rapids), Emerald Rapids
TDCALL	66 0F 01 CC	Call to VM monitor from TD guest by causing a VMEXIT.	TD Guest	(Sapphire Rapids), Emerald Rapids
