= Granite Rapids =

6th generation Xeon x86 server processors designed by Intel, released in 2024

- Launched: September 24, 2024; 20 months ago
- Designed by: Intel
- Manufactured by: Intel
- Fabrication process: Intel 3; Intel 7
- Platform(s): Server

Branding
- Brand name(s): Xeon
- Generation: Xeon 6
- Socket(s): LGA 4710; LGA 7529

Instructions and architecture
- Instructions set: x86
- Instructions: x86-64
- Extensions: AES-NI, CLMUL, RDRAND, SHA, TXT; MMX, SSE, SSE2, SSE3, SSSE3, SSE4, SSE4.1, SSE4.2, AVX, AVX2, AVX-512, AVX-VNNI, AVX-IFMA, FMA3, TSX, AMX
- P-core architecture: Redwood Cove

Cores
- L1 cache: 112 KB (per core): 64 KB instructions; 48 KB data
- L2 cache: 2 MB (per core)
- L3 cache: 3 MB (per core)

Memory support
- Type: DDR5
- Memory channels: 12 channels

I/O
- PCIe support: PCIe 5.0
- PCIe lanes: 136 PCIe 5.0 lanes
- CXL support: CXL 2.0
- UPI links: 0-6

History
- Predecessor: Emerald Rapids
- Variant: Sierra Forest
- Successor: Diamond Rapids

Granite Rapids is the codename for 6th generation Xeon Scalable server processors designed by Intel, launched on 24 September 2024. Featuring up to 128 P-cores, Granite Rapids is designed for high performance computing applications. The platform equivalent Sierra Forest processors with up to 288 E-cores launched in June 2024 before Granite Rapids.

== Background ==
On February 17, 2022, Intel announced that upcoming Xeon generations would be split into two tracks for those with P-cores exclusively and E-cores exclusively. These two tracks are intended to serve different market segments with P-core Xeon processors targeting high performance computing while E-core Xeon processors target cloud customers who prioritize greater core density, energy efficiency and performance in heavily multi-threaded workloads over strong single-threaded usage.

On January 10, 2023, Intel released its 4th generation Xeon processors codenamed Sapphire Rapids. Sapphire Rapids was the first server processors by Intel to use a disaggregated MCM approach and included in-silicon accelerators. Sapphire Rapids launched late and topped out at 60 cores, far behind AMD's 96 cores offered in its Epyc 9654 processor. 5th generation Emerald Rapids processors quickly followed Sapphire Rapids with a launch on December 14, 2023. Emerald Rapids is socket-compatible with existing Sapphire Rapids systems and brought significantly increased L3 cache and pushed the maximum core count from 60 to 64.

On August 28, 2023, Intel shared details on the architecture behind Granite Rapids and Sierra Forest in a presentation at the annual Hot Chips conference. On September 6, 2023, Intel released a video on its packaging techniques which showed a Granite Rapids package with five dies on a single substrate.

=== Branding ===
Intel Xeon branding

Xeon Scalable (2020–2023)

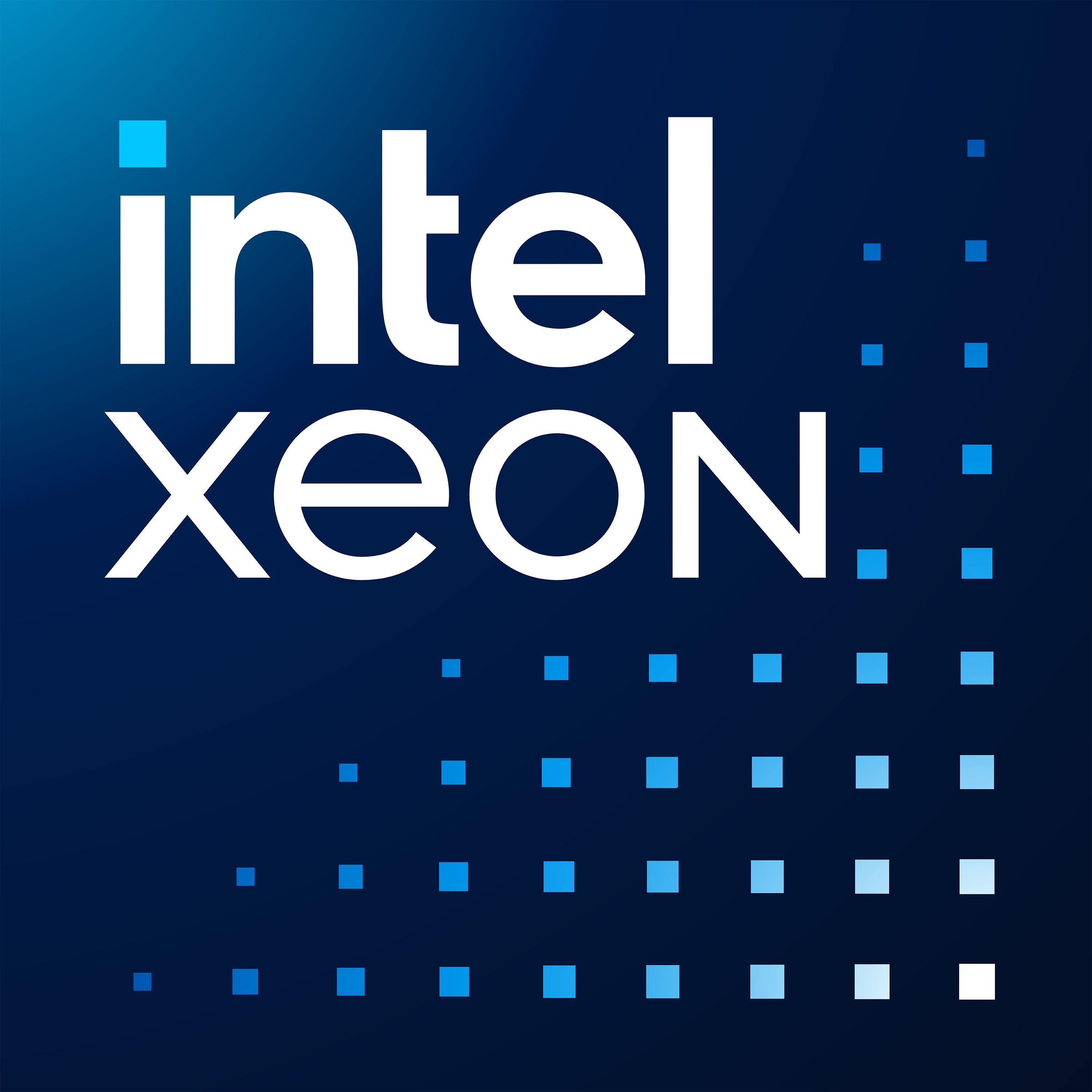
Xeon 6 (2024)

During Intel's Vision event in April 2024, new branding for Xeon processors was unveiled. The Xeon Scalable branding that was introduced in 2017 would be retired in favor of a simplified "Xeon 6" brand for 6th generation Xeon processors. This change brings greater emphasis on processor generation numbers. The badge for the Xeon brand was changed to be more visually in line with the badge design used for Intel's Core Ultra processors since 2023.

== Architecture ==
Granite Rapids processors are x86 server processors based on Intel's Redwood Cove P-core architecture.

=== Packaging ===
Granite Rapids dies are connected using Intel's Embedded Multi-die Interconnect Bridge (EMIB) packaging technique which is Intel's alternative to TSMC's Infinity Fan-Out (InFO) packaging technique. Rather than use a traditional silicon interposer, EMIB embeds a silicon bridge within an organic substrate to connect multiple dies. EMIB bridges act as a high-bandwidth, low-latency, and low-power solution for die-to-die communication. In contrast, a traditional interposer would be much larger in area and would instead be placed on top of the substrate with dies on top of the interposer. An interposer to connect all five dies in Granite Rapids processors would be prohibitively large. Intel previously used a much smaller interposer with Meteor Lake's Foveros base tile.

=== Compute tile ===
The compute tile in Granite Rapids contains cores, cache and DDR5 memory controllers. A single compute tile houses up to 44 Redwood Cove P-cores, though some cores are disabled for redundance and yield reasons. Redwood Cove cores were first introduced in Meteor Lake mobile processors. For Granite Rapids, Redwood Cove has undergone a minor node shrink from Intel 4 to Intel 3. Compared to the Raptor Cove cores in Emerald Rapids, Redwood Cove brings increased L1 cache to 112KB per core with a 16-way 64KB L1 instructions cache that is doubled from Raptor Cove's 32KB instructions cache while retaining the same 2MB of L2 cache per core. Furthermore, Redwood Cove's new Matrix Engine allows for AMX FP16 acceleration that benefits AI inference workloads. Unlike Sierra Forest, the Redwood Cove cores in Granite Rapids are able to issue AVX-512 and newly added AVX-512-FP16 instructions.

Granite Rapids compute tile dies
Segment	Cores (threads)	Memory channels (per die)	Die size	Ref.
LCC	16 (32)	8-channels		
MCC	48 (96)	8-channels		
XCC	44 (88)	4-channels	~598 mm^{2}	

==== Memory controllers ====
A compute tile also contains DDR5 memory controllers that natively support DDR5-6400. Each XCC compute tile provides four channels of DDR5 for a total of 12 memory channels across three compute tiles. This provides flexibility as SKUs with eight memory channels can be created by using two XCC compute tiles instead of three or with a single MCC compute tile. SKUs with four memory channels can use only one XCC compute tile. Lower core count Granite Rapids SKUs use monolithic LCC and MCC dies that both have an 8 channel memory controller.

Additionally, Granite Rapids adds support for Multiplexer Combined Ranks (MCR) memory DIMMs. MCR DIMMs were designed to provide higher capacities and increased memory bandwidth to high core count server processors compared to regular DDR5 RDIMMs rather than adding more DIMM slots to server motherboards due to physical space constraints. For example, a dual socket AMD EPYC "Genoa" system with 48 total DIMM slots (24 per socket) serving 12 memory channels cannot fit within a standard 19 inch server motherboard form factor. This configuration may add over 5 inches to a server motherboard so it is instead more common to have 24 total DIMM slots (12 per socket) to stay within the 19 inch motherboard standard. MCR memory is able to use both 64-byte ranks simultaneously with a data buffer that compiles the 64-byte data from each rank into one piece of 128-byte data to the CPU. Granite Rapids can support up to DDR5-8800 across 12 memory channels. On April 17, 2024, JEDEC released its updated JESD79-5C DDR5 SDRAM standard that seeks to improve reliability for high-performance servers running highly clocked DDR5 memory. This is addressed through expanded timing parameters and Per-Row Activation Counting (PRAC) to improve data integrity.

=== I/O ===
I/O in Granite Rapids processors is provided by two dies fabricated on the more mature Intel 7 process. It has an estimated die area of 241 mm^{2}. The same I/O tiles in Granite Rapids can be shared with Sierra Forest E-core processors. The I/O tiles provide 136 PCIe 5.0 lanes, an increase from Emerald Rapid's 128 lanes. These 136 PCIe 5.0 lanes support CXL 2.0 Type 3 and up to 6 UPI links. The previous generation Emerald Rapids supported CXL 1.1 Type 1 and Type 2. Granite Rapids is able to function as an SoC with self-booting capabilities without requiring a link to an external PCH. This brings Granite Rapids in line with AMD's EPYC processors that can function as SoCs.

== List of Granite Rapids processors ==
=== Granite Rapids-SP ===
Granite Rapids-SP (Scalable Performance) uses the Beechnut City platform with the smaller LGA 4710 socket, targeted towards mainstream server. It is a direct successor to Sapphire Rapids-SP and Emerald Rapids-SP that used the similarly sized LGA 4677 socket. Granite Rapids-SP features up to 86 cores and 8-channel DDR5 memory support. TDPs up to 350W are supported on Beechnut City platform.

Scalability refers to maximum sockets supported by the CPU.

Model number	Cores (threads)	Base clock	Turbo Boost		Smart Cache	TDP	Maxi- mum scala- bility	Registered DDR5 w. ECC support	UPI links	Release MSRP (USD)
Model number	Cores (threads)	Base clock	All core	Max	Smart Cache	TDP	Maxi- mum scala- bility	Registered DDR5 w. ECC support	UPI links	Release MSRP (USD)
Intel Xeon 6700/6500 P-core Mainline & Scalable SKUs
6788P	86 (172)	2.0 GHz	3.2 GHz	3.8 GHz	336 MB	350 W	8S	6400 MT/s (1 DPC); 5200 MT/s (2 DPC)	4	$19,000
6768P	64 (128)	2.4 GHz	3.6 GHz	3.9 GHz	336 MB	330 W	8S	6400 MT/s (1 DPC); 5200 MT/s (2 DPC)	4	$16,000
6738P	32 (64)	2.9 GHz	4.1 GHz	4.2 GHz	144 MB	270 W	8S	6400 MT/s (1 DPC); 5200 MT/s (2 DPC)	4	$6,540
6728P	24 (48)	2.7 GHz	3.9 GHz	4.1 GHz	144 MB	210 W	8S	6400 MT/s (1 DPC); 5200 MT/s (2 DPC)	4	$2,478
6724P	16 (32)	3.6 GHz	4.2 GHz	4.3 GHz	72 MB	210 W	8S	6400 MT/s (1 DPC); 5200 MT/s (2 DPC)	3	$3,622
6714P	8 (16)	4.0 GHz	4.3 GHz	4.3 GHz	48 MB	165 W	8S	6400 MT/s (1 DPC); 5200 MT/s (2 DPC)	3	$2,816
6760P	64 (128)	2.2 GHz	3.4 GHz	3.8 GHz	320 MB	330 W	2S	6400 MT/s (1 DPC); 5200 MT/s (2 DPC)	4	$7,803
6748P	48 (96)	2.5 GHz	3.8 GHz	4.1 GHz	192 MB	300 W	2S	6400 MT/s (1 DPC); 5200 MT/s (2 DPC)	4	
6740P	48 (96)	2.1 GHz	3.3 GHz	3.8 GHz	288 MB	270 W	2S	6400 MT/s (1 DPC); 5200 MT/s (2 DPC)	4	$4,650
6530P	32 (64)	2.3 GHz	3.7 GHz	4.1 GHz	144 MB	225 W	2S	6400 MT/s (1 DPC); 5200 MT/s (2 DPC)	4	$2,234
6520P	24 (48)	2.4 GHz	3.4 GHz	4.0 GHz	144 MB	210 W	2S	6400 MT/s (1 DPC); 5200 MT/s (2 DPC)	4	$1,295
6515P	16 (32)	2.3 GHz	3.8 GHz	3.8 GHz	72 MB	150 W	2S	6400 MT/s (1 DPC); 5200 MT/s (2 DPC)	3	$740
6505P	12 (24)	2.2 GHz	3.9 GHz	4.1 GHz	48 MB	150 W	2S	6400 MT/s (1 DPC); 5200 MT/s (2 DPC)	3	$563
Intel Xeon 6700/6500 P-core Performance SKUs
6787P	86 (172)	2.0 GHz	3.2 GHz	3.8 GHz	336 MB	350 W	2S	6400 MT/s (1 DPC); 5200 MT/s (2 DPC); MRDIMM (8000 MT/s)	4	$10,400
6776P	64 (128)	2.3 GHz	3.6 GHz	3.9 GHz	336 MB	350 W	2S	6400 MT/s (1 DPC); 5200 MT/s (2 DPC); MRDIMM (8000 MT/s)	4	
6767P	64 (128)	2.4 GHz	3.6 GHz	3.9 GHz	336 MB	350 W	2S	6400 MT/s (1 DPC); 5200 MT/s (2 DPC); MRDIMM (8000 MT/s)	4	$9,595
6762P	64 (128)	2.9 GHz	3.6 GHz	3.9 GHz	320 MB	350 W	2S	6400 MT/s (1 DPC); 5200 MT/s (2 DPC); MRDIMM (8000 MT/s)	4	$12,350
6747P	48 (96)	2.7 GHz	3.8 GHz	3.9 GHz	288 MB	350 W	2S	6400 MT/s (1 DPC); 5200 MT/s (2 DPC); MRDIMM (8000 MT/s)	4	$6,497
6745P	32 (64)	3.1 GHz	4.1 GHz	4.3 GHz	336 MB	300 W	2S	6400 MT/s (1 DPC); 5200 MT/s (2 DPC); MRDIMM (8000 MT/s)	4	$5,250
6737P	32 (64)	2.9 GHz	4.0 GHz	4.0 GHz	144 MB	270 W	2S	6400 MT/s (1 DPC); 5200 MT/s (2 DPC); MRDIMM (8000 MT/s)	4	$4,995
6736P	36 (72)	2.0 GHz	3.4 GHz	4.1 GHz	144 MB	205 W	2S	6400 MT/s (1 DPC); 5200 MT/s (2 DPC)	4	$3,351
6732P	32 (64)	3.8 GHz	4.2 GHz	4.3 GHz	144 MB	350 W	2S	6400 MT/s (1 DPC); 5200 MT/s (2 DPC)	4	$5,295
6730P	32 (64)	2.5 GHz	3.6 GHz	3.8 GHz	288 MB	250 W	2S	6400 MT/s (1 DPC); 5200 MT/s (2 DPC)	4	$3,726
6527P	24 (48)	3.0 GHz	4.2 GHz	4.2 GHz	144 MB	250 W	2S	6400 MT/s (1 DPC); 5200 MT/s (2 DPC)	4	$2,872
6517P	16 (32)	3.2 GHz	4.0 GHz	4.2 GHz	72 MB	190 W	2S	6400 MT/s (1 DPC); 5200 MT/s (2 DPC)	3	$1,195
6507P	8 (16)	3.5 GHz	4.3 GHz	4.3 GHz	48 MB	150 W	2S	6400 MT/s (1 DPC); 5200 MT/s (2 DPC)	3	$765
Intel Xeon 6700/6500 P-core 1 Socket (1S) SKUs
6781P	80 (160)	2.0 GHz	3.2 GHz	3.8 GHz	336 MB	350 W	1S	6400 MT/s (1 DPC); 5200 MT/s (2 DPC); MRDIMM (8000 MT/s)	0	$8,960
6774P	64 (128)	2.5 GHz	3.6 GHz	3.9 GHz	336 MB	350 W	1S	6400 MT/s (1 DPC); 5200 MT/s (2 DPC); MRDIMM (8000 MT/s)	0	
6761P	64 (128)	2.5 GHz	3.6 GHz	3.9 GHz	336 MB	350 W	1S	6400 MT/s (1 DPC); 5200 MT/s (2 DPC); MRDIMM (8000 MT/s)	0	$6,570
6741P	48 (96)	2.5 GHz	3.7 GHz	3.8 GHz	288 MB	300 W	1S	6400 MT/s (1 DPC); 5200 MT/s (2 DPC)	0	$4,421
6731P	32 (64)	2.5 GHz	3.9 GHz	4.1 GHz	144 MB	245 W	1S	6400 MT/s (1 DPC); 5200 MT/s (2 DPC)	0	$2,700
6521P	24 (48)	2.6 GHz	4.1 GHz	4.1 GHz	144 MB	225 W	1S	6400 MT/s (1 DPC); 5200 MT/s (2 DPC)	0	$1,250
6511P	16 (32)	2.3 GHz	4.1 GHz	4.2 GHz	72 MB	150 W	1S	6400 MT/s (1 DPC); 5200 MT/s (2 DPC)	0	$815

=== Granite Rapids-AP ===
Granite Rapids-AP (Advanced Performance) uses the Avenue City platform with the larger LGA 7529 socket. With the larger socket, Granite Rapids-AP SKUs reach higher core counts up to 128 and support up to 192 lanes of PCIe 5.0 for two-socket servers (options of up to 136 lanes for one-socket server) and also 12-channel DDR5 memory (Up to 3 TB (1 DIMM per channel (6400 MT/s)) while using 256GB memory modules). Increased TDPs up to 550W are supported on Avenue City platform. Granite Rapids is the first time that Intel has used the Advanced Performance moniker since the release of Cascade Lake in April 2019.

Model number	Cores (threads)	Base clock	Turbo Boost		Smart Cache	TDP	Maxi- mum scala- bility	Registered DDR5 w. ECC support	UPI links	Release MSRP (USD)
Model number	Cores (threads)	Base clock	All core	Max	Smart Cache	TDP	Maxi- mum scala- bility	Registered DDR5 w. ECC support	UPI links	Release MSRP (USD)
6980P	128 (256)	2.0 GHz	3.2 GHz	3.9 GHz	504 MB	500 W	2S	DDR5; 6400 MT/s (1 DPC); MRDIMM (8800 MT/s)	6	$17,800
6979P	120 (240)	2.1 GHz	3.2 GHz	3.9 GHz	504 MB	500 W	2S	DDR5; 6400 MT/s (1 DPC); MRDIMM (8800 MT/s)	6	$15,750
6972P	96 (192)	2.4 GHz	3.5 GHz	3.9 GHz	480 MB	500 W	2S	DDR5; 6400 MT/s (1 DPC); MRDIMM (8800 MT/s)	6	$14,600
6966P-C	96 (192)	3.1 GHz	3.6 GHz	3.9 GHz	432 MB	550 W	2S	DDR5; 6400 MT/s (1 DPC); MRDIMM (8800 MT/s)	6	
6962P	72 (144)	2.7 GHz	3.9 GHz	3.9 GHz	432 MB	500 W	2S	DDR5; 6400 MT/s (1 DPC); MRDIMM (8800 MT/s)	6	$9,925
6960P	72 (144)	2.7 GHz	3.8 GHz	3.9 GHz	432 MB	500 W	2S	DDR5; 6400 MT/s (1 DPC); MRDIMM (8800 MT/s)	6	$13,750
6952P	96 (192)	2.1 GHz	3.2 GHz	3.9 GHz	480 MB	400 W	2S	DDR5; 6400 MT/s (1 DPC); MRDIMM (8800 MT/s)	6	$11,400
6944P	72 (144)	1.8 GHz	3.1 GHz	3.9 GHz	432 MB	350 W	2S	DDR5; 6400 MT/s (1 DPC)	6	$6,850

=== Granite Rapids-D ===
Granite Rapids-D processors are due to be released in 2025 as the successor to 2021's Ice Lake-D processors. Granite Rapids-D is targeted at edge computing and networking with lower power consumption and integrated I/O and accelerators. Granite Rapids-D offers doubled vRAN (Virtual Radio Access Network) processing capacity and leverages Advanced Vector Extensions and integrated vRAN Boost acceleration for 5G networking. Intel announced at MWC Barcelona in February 2024 that Granite Rapids-D silicon was already sampling to customers. Granite Rapids-D uses BGA 4368 (4-channel DDR5 memory) or BGA 5026 (8-channel DDR5 memory) socket with up to 32 lanes of PCIe 5.0 and up to 16 lanes of PCIe 4.0.

Model number	Cores (threads)	Base clock	Turbo Boost		Smart Cache	TDP	Maxi- mum scala- bility	Registered DDR5 w. ECC support	UPI links	Release MSRP (USD)
Model number	Cores (threads)	Base clock	All core	Max	Smart Cache	TDP	Maxi- mum scala- bility	Registered DDR5 w. ECC support	UPI links	Release MSRP (USD)
BGA 4368 socket
6726P-B	42 (84)	2.3 GHz	Unknown	3.5 GHz	168 MB	235 W	1S	6400 MT/s (1 DPC); 5200 MT/s (2 DPC)	0	$3,795
6716P-B	40 (80)	2.5 GHz	Unknown	3.5 GHz	160 MB	235 W	1S	6400 MT/s (1 DPC); 5200 MT/s (2 DPC)	0	$3,200
6706P-B	40 (80)	2.5 GHz	Unknown	3.5 GHz	160 MB	235 W	1S	6400 MT/s (1 DPC); 5200 MT/s (2 DPC)	0	$3,200
6563P-B	38 (76)	2.4 GHz	Unknown	4.0 GHz	152 MB	235 W	1S	6400 MT/s (1 DPC); 5200 MT/s (2 DPC)	0	$2,616
6556P-B	36 (72)	2.3 GHz	Unknown	3.5 GHz	144 MB	215 W	1S	6400 MT/s (1 DPC); 5200 MT/s (2 DPC)	0	$2,628
6553P-B	36 (72)	2.6 GHz	Unknown	4.0 GHz	144 MB	235 W	1S	6400 MT/s (1 DPC); 5200 MT/s (2 DPC)	0	$2,402
6546P-B	32 (64)	2.3 GHz	Unknown	3.5 GHz	128 MB	195 W	1S	6400 MT/s (1 DPC); 5200 MT/s (2 DPC)	0	$2,368
6543P-B	32 (64)	2.0 GHz	Unknown	3.3 GHz	128 MB	160 W	1S	5600 MT/s (1 DPC)	0	$2,206
6533P-B	32 (64)	2.2 GHz	Unknown	3.9 GHz	128 MB	205 W	1S	5600 MT/s (1 DPC)	0	$1,795
6523P-B	24 (48)	2.5 GHz	Unknown	3.9 GHz	96 MB	175 W	1S	5600 MT/s (1 DPC)	0	$1,450
6516P-B	20 (40)	2.3 GHz	Unknown	3.5 GHz	80 MB	145 W	1S	4800 MT/s (1 DPC)	0	$1,544
6513P-B	20 (40)	2.0 GHz	Unknown	3.3 GHz	80 MB	130 W	1S	5600 MT/s (1 DPC)	0	$1,399
6503P-B	12 (24)	2.0 GHz	Unknown	3.5 GHz	48 MB	110 W	1S	4800 MT/s (1 DPC)	0	$934
BGA 5026 socket
6776P-B	72 (144)	2.3 GHz	2.9 GHz	3.5 GHz	288 MB	325 W	1S	6400 MT/s (1 DPC); 5200 MT/s (2 DPC)	0	$5,040
6768P-B	64 (128)	2.2 GHz	3.3 GHz	3.5 GHz	256 MB	325 W	1S	6400 MT/s (1 DPC); 5200 MT/s (2 DPC)	0	$4,200
6766P-B	64 (128)	2.3 GHz	2.9 GHz	3.5 GHz	256 MB	305 W	1S	6400 MT/s (1 DPC); 5200 MT/s (2 DPC)	0	$4,200
6756P-B	64 (128)	2.2 GHz	3.3 GHz	3.5 GHz	256 MB	325 W	1S	6400 MT/s (1 DPC); 5200 MT/s (2 DPC)	0	$3,990
6718P-B	40 (80)	2.5 GHz	Unknown	3.5 GHz	160 MB	235 W	1S	6400 MT/s (1 DPC); 5200 MT/s (2 DPC)	0	
6548P-B	32 (64)	2.0 GHz	Unknown	3.5 GHz	128 MB	195 W	1S	6400 MT/s (1 DPC); 5200 MT/s (2 DPC)	0	
6544P-B	32 (64)	2.0 GHz	Unknown	3.3 GHz	128 MB	170 W	1S	5600 MT/s (1 DPC)	0	
6532P-B	32 (64)	2.2 GHz	Unknown	3.9 GHz	128 MB	205 W	1S	5600 MT/s (1 DPC)	0	
6518P-B	20 (40)	2.0 GHz	Unknown	3.5 GHz	80 MB	150 W	1S	4800 MT/s (1 DPC)	0	

=== Granite Rapids-WS ===
Intel announced on February 2, 2026 Granite Rapids-WS processors on the LGA 4710 socket.

Model number	Cores (threads)	Base clock	Turbo Boost		Smart Cache	TDP	Registered DDR5 w. ECC support	PCI Express 5.0 lanes	Release MSRP (USD)
Model number	Cores (threads)	Base clock	All core	Max	Smart Cache	TDP	Registered DDR5 w. ECC support	PCI Express 5.0 lanes	Release MSRP (USD)
698X	86 (172)	2.0 GHz	3.0 GHz	4.8 GHz	336 MB	350 W	8-channel 6400 MT/s; MRDIMM (8000 MT/s); 4 TB	128	$7699
696X	64 (128)	2.4 GHz	3.5 GHz	4.8 GHz	336 MB	350 W	8-channel 6400 MT/s; MRDIMM (8000 MT/s); 4 TB	128	$5599
678X	48 (96)	2.4 GHz	3.8 GHz	4.9 GHz	192 MB	300 W	8-channel 6400 MT/s; MRDIMM (8000 MT/s); 4 TB	128	$3749
676X	32 (64)	2.8 GHz	4.3 GHz	4.9 GHz	144 MB	275 W	8-channel 6400 MT/s; MRDIMM (8000 MT/s); 4 TB	128	$2499
674X	28 (56)	3.0 GHz	4.3 GHz	4.9 GHz	144 MB	270 W	8-channel 6400 MT/s; MRDIMM (8000 MT/s); 4 TB	128	$2199
658X	24 (48)	3.0 GHz	4.3 GHz	4.9 GHz	144 MB	250 W	8-channel 6400 MT/s; 4 TB	128	$1699
656	20 (40)	2.9 GHz	4.5 GHz	4.8 GHz	72 MB	210 W	8-channel 6400 MT/s; 4 TB	128	$1399
654	18 (36)	3.1 GHz	4.5 GHz	4.8 GHz	72 MB	200 W	8-channel 6400 MT/s; 4 TB	128	$1199
638	16 (32)	3.2 GHz	4.5 GHz	4.8 GHz	72 MB	180 W	4-channel 6400 MT/s; 2 TB	80	$899
636	12 (24)	3.5 GHz	4.5 GHz	4.7 GHz	48 MB	170 W	4-channel 6400 MT/s; 2 TB	80	$639
634	12 (24)	2.7 GHz	3.9 GHz	4.6 GHz	48 MB	150 W	4-channel 6400 MT/s; 2 TB	80	$499

== See also ==
- Intel's process–architecture–optimization model
- Intel's tick–tock model
- List of Intel CPU microarchitectures
- Sierra Forest

Atom (ULV)		Node name	Pentium/Core						
Microarch.	Step	Node name	Microarch.	Step					
		600 nm	P6	Pentium Pro (133 MHz)					
		500 nm	P6	Pentium Pro (150 MHz)					
		350 nm	P6	Pentium Pro (166–200 MHz)					
		350 nm	P6	Klamath					
		250 nm	P6	Deschutes					
		250 nm	P6	Katmai	NetBurst				
		180 nm	P6	Coppermine	Willamette				
		130 nm	P6	Tualatin	Northwood				
		130 nm	Pentium M	Banias	Northwood		NetBurst(HT)		NetBurst(×2)
		90 nm	Pentium M	Dothan	Prescott	⇨	Prescott‑2M	⇨	Smithfield
		90 nm	Pentium M	Dothan	~~Tejas~~	→	⇩	→	~~Cedarmill (Tejas)~~
		65 nm	Pentium M	Yonah	~~Nehalem (NetBurst)~~		Cedar Mill	⇨	Presler
		65 nm	Core	Merom	4 cores on mainstream desktop, DDR3 introduced				
Bonnell	Bonnell	45 nm	Core	Penryn					
Bonnell	Bonnell	45 nm	Nehalem	Nehalem	HT reintroduced, integrated MC, PCH; L3-cache introduced, 256 KB L2-cache/core				
Bonnell	Saltwell	32 nm	Nehalem	Westmere	Introduced GPU on same package and AES-NI				
Bonnell	Saltwell	32 nm	Sandy Bridge	Sandy Bridge	On-die ring bus, no more non-UEFI motherboards				
Silvermont	Silvermont	22 nm	Sandy Bridge	Ivy Bridge					
Silvermont	Silvermont	22 nm	Haswell	Haswell	Fully integrated voltage regulator				
Silvermont	Airmont	14 nm	Haswell	Broadwell					
Silvermont	Airmont	14 nm	Skylake	Skylake	DDR4 introduced on mainstream desktop				
Goldmont		14 nm	Skylake	Kaby Lake					
Goldmont		14 nm	Skylake	Coffee Lake	6 cores on mainstream desktop				
Goldmont		14 nm	Skylake	Amber Lake	Mobile-only				
Goldmont Plus		14 nm	Skylake	Whiskey Lake	Mobile-only				
Goldmont Plus		14 nm	Skylake	Coffee Lake Refresh	8 cores on mainstream desktop				
Goldmont Plus		14 nm	Skylake	Comet Lake	10 cores on mainstream desktop				
Goldmont Plus		14 nm	Sunny Cove	Cypress Cove (Rocket Lake)	Backported Sunny Cove microarchitecture for 14 nm				
Tremont		10 nm	Skylake	Palm Cove (Cannon Lake)	Mobile-only				
Tremont		10 nm	Sunny Cove	Sunny Cove (Ice Lake)	512 KB L2-cache/core				
Tremont		10 nm	Sunny Cove	Willow Cove (Tiger Lake)	X^{e} graphics engine				
Gracemont		Intel 7 (10 nm ESF)	Golden Cove	Golden Cove (Alder Lake)	Hybrid, DDR5, PCIe 5.0				
Gracemont		Intel 7 (10 nm ESF)	Golden Cove	Raptor Cove (Raptor Lake)					
Crestmont		Intel 4	Redwood Cove	Meteor Lake	Mobile-only; NPU, chiplet architecture				
Crestmont		Intel 3	Redwood Cove	Arrow Lake-U					
Skymont		TSMC N3B	Lion Cove	Lunar Lake	Low power mobile only (9–30 W)				
Skymont		TSMC N3B	Lion Cove	Arrow Lake					
Darkmont		Intel 18A	Cougar Cove	Panther Lake					
Arctic Wolf		Intel 18A and/or TSMC N2P	Coyote Cove	Nova Lake					
