= LGA 4677 =

CPU socket designed by Intel

- Release date: January 10, 2023
- Designed by: Intel
- Manufactured by: Lotes
- Type: LGA-ZIF
- Chip form factors: Flip-chip
- Contacts: 4677
- FSB protocol: PCI Express; Direct Media Interface; Ultra Path Interconnect
- FSB frequency: 16 GT/s to 20 GT/s UPI
- Processor dimensions: 77.5 mm x 56.5 mm
- Processors: Sapphire Rapids; Emerald Rapids
- Predecessor: LGA 4189
- Successor: LGA 4710; LGA 7529
- Memory support: DDR5 with ECC support
- This article is part of the CPU socket series

LGA 4677 (Socket E) is a zero insertion force flip-chip land grid array (LGA) CPU socket designed by Intel, compatible with Sapphire Rapids server and workstation processors, which was released in January 2023.

== Features ==
- Support for PCI Express 5.0 and Direct Media Interface 4.0
- Supports 8 channels of DDR5 RAM with error correction code support
- Intel Smart Sound Technology that provides dedicated audio voice processing to support voice wake functions is currently available only on the W790 chipset.

== Chipsets ==
			Chipset	
			C741	W790
Release date			January 2023	March 2023
Price (USD)			$70	$72
Overclocking			No	Yes
Bus interface			DMI 4.0 x8	DMI 4.0 x8
CPU support			Sapphire Rapids-SP; Emerald Rapids-SP	Sapphire Rapids-WS; Sapphire Rapids-64L; Sapphire Rapids-112L
Socket count			1s or 2S	1S
Memory capacity			Up to 4 TB with one CPU or 8 TB with two CPUs	Up to 2 TB (on W-2400 models); Up to 4 TB (on W-3400 models)
ECC memory			RDIMM	RDIMM
Maximum DIMM slots			16 (1 CPU) 32 (2 CPUs)	8 (W-2400); 16 (W-3400)
Maximum USB 2.0 ports			14	
USB 3.2 ports configuration	Gen 1 (5 Gbit/s)		10	10
USB 3.2 ports configuration	Gen 2	x1 (10 Gbit/s)	?	10
USB 3.2 ports configuration	Gen 2	x2 (20 Gbit/s)	?	5
Maximum SATA 3.0 ports			20	8
Processor PCI Express configuration		5.0	Up to 80 lanes	Up to 112 lanes
Processor PCI Express configuration		4.0	—N/a	
PCH PCI Express configuration		4.0	—N/a	16
PCH PCI Express configuration		3.0	20	12
Independent display support (digital ports/pipes)			?	
Wireless		Integrated	No	Intel Wi-Fi 6E AX211 (Garfield Peak 2)
Wireless		Discrete	No	Intel Wi-Fi 6E AX211 (Typhoon Peak 2)
PCIe RAID support			?	
SATA RAID support			?	
Intel Optane Memory support			?	
Intel Smart Sound Technology			No	Yes
Intel Active Management, Trusted Execution and vPro Technology			Yes	
Chipset TDP			11 W	6 W
Chipset package size			22 mm × 23 mm 506 mm^{2}	28 mm × 25 mm 700 mm^{2}

== See also ==
- List of Intel microprocessors
- List of Intel chipsets
