= Emerald Rapids =

Intel microprocessor, released in 2023

General information
- Launched: December 14, 2023
- Marketed by: Intel
- Designed by: Intel
- Common manufacturer: Intel
- Product code: 80722

Performance
- Max. CPU clock rate: 1.9 GHz to 4.2 GHz
- QPI speeds: 16 GT/s to 20 GT/s
- DMI speeds: 16 GT/s

Physical specifications
- Cores: 8-64
- Package: Flip-chip land grid array (FC-LGA)
- Socket: LGA 4677

Cache
- L1 cache: 80 KB per core: 32 KB instruction; 48 KB data
- L2 cache: 2 MB (per core)
- L3 cache: 5 MB (per core)

Architecture and classification
- Application: Server; Embedded
- Technology node: Intel 7 (previously known as 10ESF)
- Microarchitecture: Raptor Cove
- Instruction set: x86-64
- Instructions: MMX, SSE, SSE2, SSE3, SSSE3, SSE4.1, SSE4.2, AVX, AVX2, FMA3, AVX-512, AVX-VNNI, TSX, AMX
- Extensions: AES-NI, CLMUL, RDRAND, SHA, TXT, VT-x, VT-d

Products, models, variants
- Product code name: EMR
- Model: Emerald Rapids-SP
- Brand names: Xeon Bronze; Xeon Silver; Xeon Gold; Xeon Platinum

History
- Predecessor: Sapphire Rapids
- Successors: Granite Rapids (P-cores); Sierra Forest (E-cores)

Emerald Rapids is the codename for Intel's fifth generation Xeon Scalable server processors based on the Intel 7 node. Emerald Rapids CPUs are designed for data centers; the roughly contemporary Raptor Lake is intended for desktop and mobile usage. Nevine Nassif is a chief engineer for this generation.

== Features ==
=== CPU ===
- Up to 64 Raptor Cove CPU cores per package
  - Up to 32 cores per tile, reducing the max tiles to two
- 5 MB of L3 cache per core (up from 1.875 MB in Sapphire Rapids)
- Speed Select Technology that supports high and low priority cores

=== I/O ===
- DDR5 memory support up to 8-channel DDR5-5600
- Up to 80 PCI Express 5.0 lanes

== List of Emerald Rapids processors ==
=== Emerald Rapids-SP (Scalable Performance) ===
CPUs in italic are actually Sapphire Rapids processors, and they still have 1.875 MB of L3 cache per core.

Suffixes to denote:

- +: Includes 1 of each of the four accelerators: DSA, IAA, QAT, DLB
- H: Database and analytics workloads, supports 4S (Xeon Gold) and/or 8S (Xeon Platinum) configurations and includes all of the accelerators
- M: Media transcode workloads
- N: Network/5G/Edge workloads (High TPT/Low Latency), some are uniprocessor
- P: Cloud and infrastructure as a service (IaaS) workloads
- Q: Liquid cooling
- S: Storage & Hyper-converged infrastructure (HCI) workloads
- T: Long-life use/High thermal case
- U: Uniprocessor (some workload-specific SKUs may also be uniprocessor)
- V: Optimized for cloud and software as a service (SaaS) workloads, some are uniprocessor
- Y: Speed Select Technology-Performance Profile (SST-PP) enabled (some workload-specific SKUs may also support SST-PP)
- Y+: Speed Select Technology-Performance Profile (SST-PP) enabled and includes 1 of each of the accelerators.

Model number	Cores (Threads)	Base clock	All core turbo boost	Max turbo boost	Smart Cache	TDP	Maximum scalability	Registered DDR5 w. ECC support	UPI Links	Release MSRP (USD)
Xeon Platinum (8500)
8593Q	64 (128)	2.2 GHz	3.0 GHz	3.9 GHz	320 MB	385 W	2S	5600 MT/s	4	$12400
8592+	64 (128)	1.9 GHz	2.9 GHz	3.9 GHz	320 MB	350 W	2S	5600 MT/s	4	$11600
8592V	64 (128)	2.0 GHz	2.9 GHz	3.9 GHz	320 MB	330 W	2S	4800 MT/s	3	$10995
8581V	60 (120)	2.0 GHz	2.6 GHz	3.9 GHz	300 MB	270 W	1S	4800 MT/s	0	$7568
8580	60 (120)	2.0 GHz	2.9 GHz	4.0 GHz	300 MB	350 W	2S	5600 MT/s	4	$10710
8573C	?	?	3.0 GHz	?	?	?	?	?	?	?
8571N	52 (104)	2.4 GHz	3.0 GHz	4.0 GHz	300 MB	350 W	1S	4800 MT/s	0	$6839
8570	56 (112)	2.1 GHz	3.0 GHz	4.0 GHz	300 MB	350 W	2S	5600 MT/s	4	$9595
8568Y+	48 (96)	2.3 GHz	3.2 GHz	4.0 GHz	300 MB	350 W	2S	5600 MT/s	4	$6497
8562Y+	32 (64)	2.8 GHz	3.8 GHz	4.1 GHz	60 MB	300 W	2S	5600 MT/s	3	$5945
8558	48 (96)	2.1 GHz	3.0 GHz	4.0 GHz	260 MB	330 W	2S	5200 MT/s	4	$4650
8558P	48 (96)	2.7 GHz	3.2 GHz	4.0 GHz	260 MB	350 W	2S	5600 MT/s	3	$6759
8558U	48 (96)	2.0 GHz	2.9 GHz	4.0 GHz	260 MB	300 W	1S	5200 MT/s	0	$3720
Xeon Gold (5500 and 6500)
6558Q	32 (64)	3.2 GHz	4.1 GHz	4.1 GHz	60 MB	350 W	2S	5200 MT/s	3	$6416
6554S	36 (72)	2.2 GHz	3.0 GHz	4.0 GHz	180 MB	270 W	2S	5200 MT/s	4	$3157
6548Y+	32 (64)	2.5 GHz	3.5 GHz	4.1 GHz	60 MB	250 W	2S	5200 MT/s	3	$3726
6548N	32 (64)	2.8 GHz	3.5 GHz	4.1 GHz	60 MB	250 W	2S	5200 MT/s	3	$3875
6544Y	16 (32)	3.6 GHz	4.1 GHz	4.1 GHz	45 MB	270 W	2S	5200 MT/s	3	$3622
6542Y	24 (48)	2.9 GHz	3.6 GHz	4.1 GHz	60 MB	250 W	2S	5200 MT/s	3	$2878
6538Y+	32 (64)	2.2 GHz	3.3 GHz	4.0 GHz	60 MB	225 W	2S	5200 MT/s	3	$3141
6538N	32 (64)	2.1 GHz	2.9 GHz	4.1 GHz	60 MB	205 W	2S	5200 MT/s	3	$3875
6534	8 (16)	3.9 GHz	4.2 GHz	4.2 GHz	22.5 MB	195 W	2S	4800 MT/s	3	$2816
6530	32 (64)	2.1 GHz	2.7 GHz	4.0 GHz	160 MB	270 W	2S	4800 MT/s	3	$2128
6526Y	16 (32)	2.8 GHz	3.5 GHz	3.9 GHz	37.5 MB	195 W	2S	5200 MT/s	3	$1517
5520+	28 (56)	2.2 GHz	3.0 GHz	4.0 GHz	52.5 MB	205 W	2S	4800 MT/s	3	$1640
5515+	8 (16)	3.2 GHz	3.6 GHz	4.1 GHz	22.5 MB	165 W	2S	4800 MT/s	3	$1099
5512U	28 (56)	2.1 GHz	3.0 GHz	3.7 GHz	22.5 MB	185 W	1S	4800 MT/s	0	$1230
Xeon Silver (4500)
4516Y+	24 (48)	2.2 GHz	2.9 GHz	3.7 GHz	45 MB	185 W	2S	4400 MT/s	2	$1295
4514Y	16 (32)	2.0 GHz	2.6 GHz	3.4 GHz	30 MB	150 W	2S	4400 MT/s	2	$780
4510T	12 (24)	2.0 GHz	2.8 GHz	3.7 GHz	30 MB	115 W	2S	4400 MT/s	2	$624
4510	12 (24)	2.4 GHz	3.3 GHz	4.1 GHz	30 MB	150 W	2S	4400 MT/s	2	$563
4509Y	8 (16)	2.6 GHz	3.6 GHz	4.1 GHz	22.5 MB	125 W	2S	4400 MT/s	2	$563
Xeon Bronze (3500)
3508U	8 (8)	2.1 GHz	2.2 GHz		22.5 MB	125 W	1S	4400 MT/s	0	$415-$425

== See also ==
- Intel's process–architecture–optimization model
- Intel's tick–tock model
- List of Intel CPU microarchitectures

Atom (ULV)		Node name	Pentium/Core						
Microarch.	Step	Node name	Microarch.	Step					
		600 nm	P6	Pentium Pro (133 MHz)					
		500 nm	P6	Pentium Pro (150 MHz)					
		350 nm	P6	Pentium Pro (166–200 MHz)					
		350 nm	P6	Klamath					
		250 nm	P6	Deschutes					
		250 nm	P6	Katmai	NetBurst				
		180 nm	P6	Coppermine	Willamette				
		130 nm	P6	Tualatin	Northwood				
		130 nm	Pentium M	Banias	Northwood		NetBurst(HT)		NetBurst(×2)
		90 nm	Pentium M	Dothan	Prescott	⇨	Prescott‑2M	⇨	Smithfield
		90 nm	Pentium M	Dothan	~~Tejas~~	→	⇩	→	~~Cedarmill (Tejas)~~
		65 nm	Pentium M	Yonah	~~Nehalem (NetBurst)~~		Cedar Mill	⇨	Presler
		65 nm	Core	Merom	4 cores on mainstream desktop, DDR3 introduced				
Bonnell	Bonnell	45 nm	Core	Penryn					
Bonnell	Bonnell	45 nm	Nehalem	Nehalem	HT reintroduced, integrated MC, PCH; L3-cache introduced, 256 KB L2-cache/core				
Bonnell	Saltwell	32 nm	Nehalem	Westmere	Introduced GPU on same package and AES-NI				
Bonnell	Saltwell	32 nm	Sandy Bridge	Sandy Bridge	On-die ring bus, no more non-UEFI motherboards				
Silvermont	Silvermont	22 nm	Sandy Bridge	Ivy Bridge					
Silvermont	Silvermont	22 nm	Haswell	Haswell	Fully integrated voltage regulator				
Silvermont	Airmont	14 nm	Haswell	Broadwell					
Silvermont	Airmont	14 nm	Skylake	Skylake	DDR4 introduced on mainstream desktop				
Goldmont		14 nm	Skylake	Kaby Lake					
Goldmont		14 nm	Skylake	Coffee Lake	6 cores on mainstream desktop				
Goldmont		14 nm	Skylake	Amber Lake	Mobile-only				
Goldmont Plus		14 nm	Skylake	Whiskey Lake	Mobile-only				
Goldmont Plus		14 nm	Skylake	Coffee Lake Refresh	8 cores on mainstream desktop				
Goldmont Plus		14 nm	Skylake	Comet Lake	10 cores on mainstream desktop				
Goldmont Plus		14 nm	Sunny Cove	Cypress Cove (Rocket Lake)	Backported Sunny Cove microarchitecture for 14 nm				
Tremont		10 nm	Skylake	Palm Cove (Cannon Lake)	Mobile-only				
Tremont		10 nm	Sunny Cove	Sunny Cove (Ice Lake)	512 KB L2-cache/core				
Tremont		10 nm	Sunny Cove	Willow Cove (Tiger Lake)	X^{e} graphics engine				
Gracemont		Intel 7 (10 nm ESF)	Golden Cove	Golden Cove (Alder Lake)	Hybrid, DDR5, PCIe 5.0				
Gracemont		Intel 7 (10 nm ESF)	Golden Cove	Raptor Cove (Raptor Lake)					
Crestmont		Intel 4	Redwood Cove	Meteor Lake	Mobile-only; NPU, chiplet architecture				
Crestmont		Intel 3	Redwood Cove	Arrow Lake-U					
Skymont		TSMC N3B	Lion Cove	Lunar Lake	Low power mobile only (9–30 W)				
Skymont		TSMC N3B	Lion Cove	Arrow Lake					
Darkmont		Intel 18A	Cougar Cove	Panther Lake					
Arctic Wolf		Intel 18A and/or TSMC N2P	Coyote Cove	Nova Lake					
