= Socket 6 =

Microprocessor socket

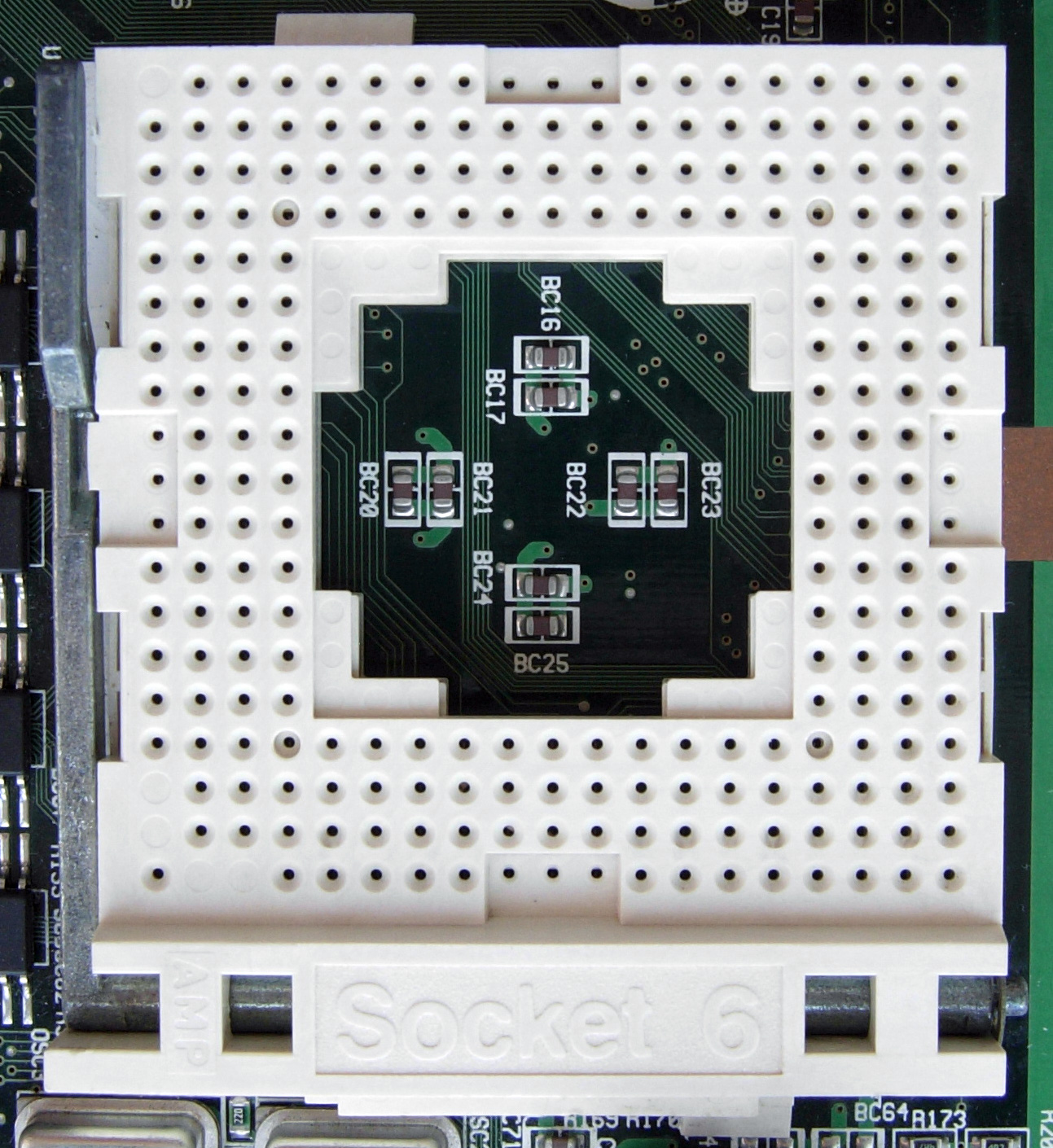
- Type: ZIF
- Chip form factors: PPGA
- Contacts: 235
- FSB protocol: ?
- FSB frequency: 60–66 MT/s
- Voltage range: 3.3 V
- Processors: Intel 486
- Predecessor: Socket 3
- This article is part of the CPU socket series

Socket 6 was a 486-generation CPU socket, a slightly modified version of the more common Socket 3. It was used in a few motherboards.

Intel designed this new standard near the end of the 80486's market life, and therefore few motherboards were produced that used it, especially as the Socket 3 standard was already sufficient.

== See also ==
- List of Intel microprocessors
