= LGA 4710 =

CPU socket designed by Intel

- Type: LGA-ZIF
- Chip form factors: Flip-chip
- Contacts: 4710
- Processors: Granite Rapids; Sierra Forest
- Predecessor: LGA 4677
- Memory support: DDR5
- This article is part of the CPU socket series

LGA 4710 is a zero insertion force flip-chip land grid array (LGA) socket designed by Intel that is used by Sierra Forest, a line of E-core only Xeon processors designed for heavily multithreaded cloud workloads. It also supports the Granite Rapids line of mainstream server and workstation processors.

The first pictures of LGA 4710 were posted in December 2023, by Yuuki_Ans on Twitter.

LGA 4710 is a counterpart to Intel's larger LGA 7529 socket, which also supports Sierra Forest CPUs. The LGA 4710 platform has a lower TDP and supports only eight DDR5 memory channels, as opposed to LGA 7529's twelve DDR5 memory channels.

On June 4th 2024, Intel launched the Sierra Forest SP line of processors, which use the LGA 4710 socket. The Sierra Forest AP line of processors uses the larger and more capable LGA 7529 platform.

Intel's Granite Rapids line of server CPUs is launched on 24 September 2024, which will also utilize both the LGA 4710 and LGA 7529 sockets.
