= Sierra Forest =

Intel microprocessor, released in 2024

- Launched: June 4, 2024
- Designed by: Intel
- Manufactured by: Intel
- Fabrication process: Intel 3
- Codename(s): SRF
- Platform(s): Server

Branding
- Brand name(s): Xeon
- Generation: Xeon 6
- Socket(s): LGA 4710; LGA 7529

Instructions and architecture
- Instructions set: x86
- Instructions: x86-64
- Extensions: MMX, SSE, SSE2, SSE3, SSSE3, SSE4.1, SSE4.2; AVX, AVX2, FMA3, AVX-VNNI, AVX-IFMA, TSX; VT-x, VT-d; AES-NI, SHA, RDRAND
- E-core architecture: Crestmont

Cores
- Peak core clock: Up to 3.2 GHz
- E-core L1 cache: 96 KB (per core): 64 KB instructions; 32 KB data
- E-core L2 cache: 4 MB (per cluster)
- E-core L3 cache: 3 MB (per cluster)

Memory support
- Type: DDR5
- Memory channels: 8 channels / 12 channels with Sierra Forest-AP
- Maximum capacity: Up to 1 TB

I/O
- PCIe support: PCIe 5.0
- PCIe lanes: 88 PCIe 5.0 lanes
- CXL support: CXL 2.0
- DMI version: DMI 4.0

History
- Variant: Granite Rapids (P-core)
- Successor: Clearwater Forest

Sierra Forest is the codename for sixth generation Xeon Scalable server processors designed by Intel, launched in June 2024. It is the first generation of Xeon processors to exclusively feature density-optimized E-cores. Sierra Forest processors are targeted towards cloud server customers with up to 288 Crestmont E-cores.

== Background ==
On February 17, 2022, Intel announced that upcoming Xeon generations would be split into two tracks for those with P-cores exclusively and E-cores exclusively. These two tracks are intended to serve different market segments with P-core Xeon processors targeting high-performance computing while E-core Xeon processors target cloud customers who prioritize greater core density, energy efficiency and performance in heavily multi-threaded workloads over strong single-threaded usage.

On March 29, 2023, Intel announced that Sierra Forest processors had powered on and displayed a processor running 144 E-cores, and announced a release timeline for H1 2024. On September 19, 2023, Intel announced at their Innovation event that a 288-core variant of Sierra Forest would be coming.

On June 3, 2024, Intel released the Sierra Forest-SP line of SKUs, also known as the Xeon 6700E series. This product line included seven SKUs at launch, all using the LGA 4710 socket. The low-end SKU has 64 cores, and the high-end SKU has 144 cores.

=== Branding ===
During Intel's Vision event in April 2024, new branding for Xeon processors was unveiled. The Xeon Scalable branding that was introduced in 2017 would be retired in favor of a simplified "Xeon 6" brand for sixth generation Xeon processors. This change brings greater emphasis on processor generation numbers. The badge for the Xeon brand was changed to be more visually in line with the badge design used for Intel's Core Ultra processors since 2023.

Intel Xeon branding

Xeon Scalable (2020-2023)

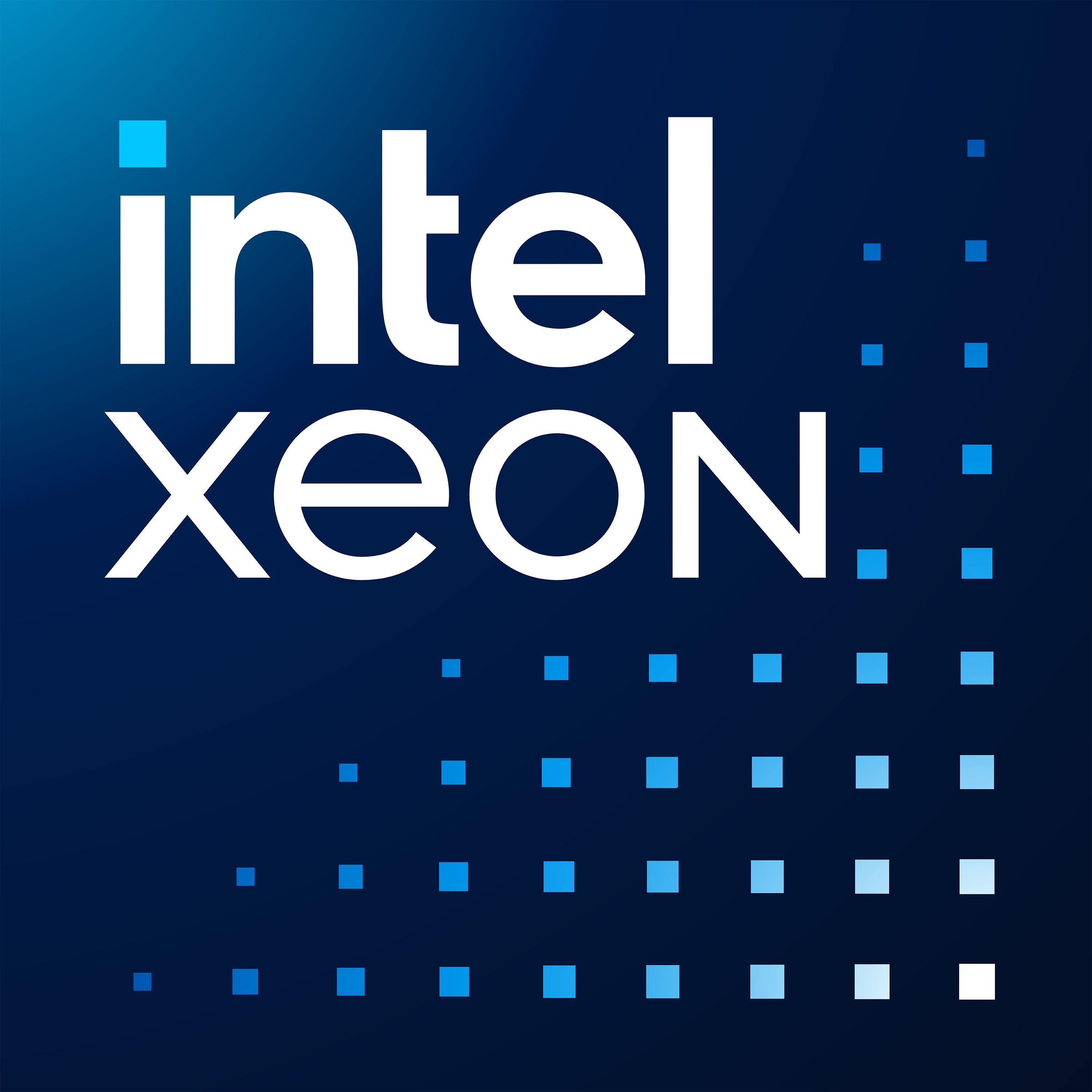
Xeon 6 (2024)

== Architecture ==
Sierra Forest uses only E-cores to achieve higher core counts in order to compete with AMD's Epyc server processors codenamed Bergamo which features up to 128 smaller Zen 4c cores. AMD's Zen 4c cores feature simultaneous multithreading (SMT) while the Crestmont E-cores featured in Sierra Forest processors can only support one thread for each core. The purpose of the Sierra Forest architecture design is to achieve ultra-high core counts for greater compute density that would benefit cloud and HPC server applications. Cloud service providers may not be as interested in HPC accelerators and instead prioritize greater ECU/vCPU integer and floating-point performance. Don Soltis is the principal engineer and chief architect for Xeon E-Core.

== List of Sierra Forest processors ==
=== Sierra Forest-SP ===
Sierra Forest-SP (Scalable Performance) uses the Beechnut City platform with the smaller LGA 4710 socket, targeted towards mainstream server. Sierra Forest-SP features up to 144 E-cores and eight-channel DDR5 ECC memory support. TDPs up to 350W are supported on Beechnut City platform. All models have 88 PCI Express 5.0 lanes

SKU	Cores (threads)	Tiles	Core config (Note: Number of compute tiles × cores per compute tile)	Clock rate		Cache		Maximum scalability	Memory support	TDP	Release date	MSRP (USD) (Note: Price is Recommended Customer Price (RCP) at February 27, 2025. RCP is the trade price that processors are sold by Intel to retailers and OEMs. Actual MSRP for consumers is higher.)
SKU	Cores (threads)	Tiles	Core config	Base	Turbo	L2	L3	Maximum scalability	Memory support	TDP	Release date	MSRP (USD)
6710E	64 (64)	1 × Compute; 2 × I/O	1 × 64	2.4 GHz	3.2 GHz	64 MB	96 MB	2S	DDR5-5600	205 W	Jun 4, 2024	$2,199
6731E	96 (96)	1 × Compute; 2 × I/O	1 × 96	2.2 GHz	3.1 GHz	96 MB	96 MB	1S	DDR5-5600	250 W	Jun 4, 2024	$3,297
6740E	96 (96)	1 × Compute; 2 × I/O	1 × 96	2.4 GHz	3.2 GHz	96 MB	96 MB	2S	DDR5-6400	250 W	Jun 4, 2024	$3,949
6746E	112 (112)	1 × Compute; 2 × I/O	1 × 112	2.0 GHz	2.7 GHz	112 MB	96 MB	2S	DDR5-5600	250 W	Jun 4, 2024	$4,447
6756E	128 (128)	1 × Compute; 2 × I/O	1 × 128	1.8 GHz	2.6 GHz	128 MB	96 MB	2S	DDR5-6400	225 W	Jun 4, 2024	$6,320
6766E	144 (144)	1 × Compute; 2 × I/O	1 × 144	1.9 GHz	2.7 GHz	144 MB	108 MB	2S	DDR5-6400	250 W	Jun 4, 2024	$7,692
6780E	144 (144)	1 × Compute; 2 × I/O	1 × 144	2.2 GHz	3.0 GHz	144 MB	108 MB	2S	DDR5-6400	330 W	Jun 4, 2024	$8,513

=== Sierra Forest-AP ===
Sierra Forest-AP uses the Avenue City platform with the larger LGA 7529 socket for higher core count SKUs up to 288. It supports a higher number PCIe lanes and 12-channel DDR5 memory.

== See also ==
- Process–architecture–optimization model, by Intel
- Tick–tock model, by Intel
- List of Intel CPU microarchitectures

Atom (ULV)		Node name	Pentium/Core						
Microarch.	Step	Node name	Microarch.	Step					
		600 nm	P6	Pentium Pro (133 MHz)					
		500 nm	P6	Pentium Pro (150 MHz)					
		350 nm	P6	Pentium Pro (166–200 MHz)					
		350 nm	P6	Klamath					
		250 nm	P6	Deschutes					
		250 nm	P6	Katmai	NetBurst				
		180 nm	P6	Coppermine	Willamette				
		130 nm	P6	Tualatin	Northwood				
		130 nm	Pentium M	Banias	Northwood		NetBurst(HT)		NetBurst(×2)
		90 nm	Pentium M	Dothan	Prescott	⇨	Prescott‑2M	⇨	Smithfield
		90 nm	Pentium M	Dothan	~~Tejas~~	→	⇩	→	~~Cedarmill (Tejas)~~
		65 nm	Pentium M	Yonah	~~Nehalem (NetBurst)~~		Cedar Mill	⇨	Presler
		65 nm	Core	Merom	4 cores on mainstream desktop, DDR3 introduced				
Bonnell	Bonnell	45 nm	Core	Penryn					
Bonnell	Bonnell	45 nm	Nehalem	Nehalem	HT reintroduced, integrated MC, PCH; L3-cache introduced, 256 KB L2-cache/core				
Bonnell	Saltwell	32 nm	Nehalem	Westmere	Introduced GPU on same package and AES-NI				
Bonnell	Saltwell	32 nm	Sandy Bridge	Sandy Bridge	On-die ring bus, no more non-UEFI motherboards				
Silvermont	Silvermont	22 nm	Sandy Bridge	Ivy Bridge					
Silvermont	Silvermont	22 nm	Haswell	Haswell	Fully integrated voltage regulator				
Silvermont	Airmont	14 nm	Haswell	Broadwell					
Silvermont	Airmont	14 nm	Skylake	Skylake	DDR4 introduced on mainstream desktop				
Goldmont		14 nm	Skylake	Kaby Lake					
Goldmont		14 nm	Skylake	Coffee Lake	6 cores on mainstream desktop				
Goldmont		14 nm	Skylake	Amber Lake	Mobile-only				
Goldmont Plus		14 nm	Skylake	Whiskey Lake	Mobile-only				
Goldmont Plus		14 nm	Skylake	Coffee Lake Refresh	8 cores on mainstream desktop				
Goldmont Plus		14 nm	Skylake	Comet Lake	10 cores on mainstream desktop				
Goldmont Plus		14 nm	Sunny Cove	Cypress Cove (Rocket Lake)	Backported Sunny Cove microarchitecture for 14 nm				
Tremont		10 nm	Skylake	Palm Cove (Cannon Lake)	Mobile-only				
Tremont		10 nm	Sunny Cove	Sunny Cove (Ice Lake)	512 KB L2-cache/core				
Tremont		10 nm	Sunny Cove	Willow Cove (Tiger Lake)	X^{e} graphics engine				
Gracemont		Intel 7 (10 nm ESF)	Golden Cove	Golden Cove (Alder Lake)	Hybrid, DDR5, PCIe 5.0				
Gracemont		Intel 7 (10 nm ESF)	Golden Cove	Raptor Cove (Raptor Lake)					
Crestmont		Intel 4	Redwood Cove	Meteor Lake	Mobile-only; NPU, chiplet architecture				
Crestmont		Intel 3	Redwood Cove	Arrow Lake-U					
Skymont		TSMC N3B	Lion Cove	Lunar Lake	Low power mobile only (9–30 W)				
Skymont		TSMC N3B	Lion Cove	Arrow Lake					
Darkmont		Intel 18A	Cougar Cove	Panther Lake					
Arctic Wolf		Intel 18A and/or TSMC N2P	Coyote Cove	Nova Lake					
