= Sapphire Rapids =

Intel microprocessor, released in 2023

General information
- Launched: January 10, 2023; 3 years ago
- Marketed by: Intel
- Designed by: Intel
- Common manufacturer: Intel
- CPUID code: 806F6
- Product code: 80713

Performance
- Max. CPU clock rate: Up to 4.8 GHz
- QPI speeds: 16 GT/s
- DMI speeds: 16 GT/s

Physical specifications
- Cores: 6-60 per socket
- Memory (RAM): Up to 4 TB per socket; Up to octa-channel DDR5-4800 with ECC support
- Package: Flip chip land grid array (FC-LGA)
- Socket: LGA 4677

Cache
- L1 cache: 80 KB per core (32 KB instruction + 48 KB data)
- L2 cache: 2 MB per core
- L3 cache: Up to 112.5 MB (1.875 MB per core)
- L4 cache: 64 GB HBM2a (Xeon Max only)

Architecture and classification
- Application: Server; Workstation; Embedded
- Technology node: Intel 7 (previously known as 10ESF)
- Microarchitecture: Golden Cove
- Instruction set: x86-64
- Instructions: MMX, SSE, SSE2, SSE3, SSSE3, SSE4.1, SSE4.2, AVX, AVX2, FMA3, AVX-512, AVX-VNNI, TSX, AMX, AES-NI, CLMUL, RDRAND, UINTR
- Extensions: SHA, TXT, VT-x, VT-d, DSA, QAT, DLB, IAA

Products, models, variants
- Product code name: SPR
- Models: Sapphire Rapids-SP; Sapphire Rapids-WS; Sapphire Rapids-HBM
- Brand names: Xeon Bronze/Sliver/Gold/Platinum; Xeon Max Series; Xeon w3/w5/w7/w9

History
- Predecessors: Ice Lake (workstations, 1S and 2S servers); Cooper Lake (4S and 8S servers)
- Successor: Emerald Rapids

Support status
- Supported

Sapphire Rapids is a codename for Intel's server (fourth generation Xeon Scalable) and workstation (Xeon W-2400/2500 and Xeon W-3400/3500) processors based on the Golden Cove microarchitecture and produced using Intel 7. It features up to 60 cores and an array of accelerators, and it is the first generation of Intel server and workstation processors to use a chiplet design.

Sapphire Rapids is part of the Eagle Stream server platform. In addition, it powers Aurora, an exascale supercomputer in the United States, at Argonne National Laboratory.

== History ==
Sapphire Rapids has been a long-standing Intel project along Alder Lake in development for over five years and has been subjected to many delays. It was first announced by Intel at their Investor Meeting in May 2019 with the intention of Sapphire Rapids succeeding Ice Lake and Cooper Lake in 2021. Intel again announced details on Sapphire Rapids in their August 2021 Architecture Day presentation with no mention of a launch date.

Intel CEO Pat Gelsinger tacitly blamed the previous Intel leadership as a reason for Sapphire Rapids' many delays. One industry analyst firm claimed that Intel was having problems with yields from its Intel 7 node with yields of 50–60% on higher core-count silicon. Sapphire Rapids was originally scheduled for a launch in the first half of 2022. It was later scheduled for release in Q4 2022 but was again delayed to early 2023. The specific announcement date of January 10, 2023 was not revealed by Intel until November 2022.

The server processor lineup was released on January 10, 2023, and the workstation processor lineup was released on February 15, 2023. Those processors were available for shipping on March 14 of that year. Intel shipped more than million of this generation Xeon processors in 2023.

== Features ==
=== CPU ===
- Up to 60 Golden Cove CPU cores per package
  - Up to 15 cores per tile, a 60 core Xeon Platinum 8490H uses 4 dies populated with 15 cores to have 60 cores in total
- AVX512-FP16
- TSX Suspend Load Address Tracking (TSXLDTRK)
- Advanced Matrix Extensions (AMX)
- Trust Domain Extensions (TDX), a collection of technologies to help deploy hardware-isolated virtual machines (VMs) called trust domains (TDs)
- User Interrupts (UINTR), a new architectural feature allowing interrupts to be delivered to user-mode software without kernel involvement.
- Indirect branch tracking and CET shadow stack.

=== Accelerators ===
- In-Field Scan (IFS), a technology that allows for testing the processor for potential hardware faults without taking it completely offline
- Data Streaming Accelerator (DSA), an ASIC that allows for speeding up data copy and transformation between different kinds of storage
- QuickAssist Technology (QAT), an ASIC that allows for improved performance of compression and encryption tasks
- Dynamic Load Balancer (DLB), an ASIC that allows for offloading tasks of load balancing, packet prioritization and queue management
- In-Memory Analytics Accelerator (IAA), an ASIC that allows accelerating in-memory databases and big data analytics

Not all accelerators are available in all processor models. Some accelerators are available under the Intel On Demand program, also known as Software Defined Silicon (SDSi), where a license is required to activate a given accelerator that is physically present in the processor. The license can be obtained as a one-time purchase or as a paid subscription. Activating the license requires support in the operating system. A driver with the necessary support was added in Linux kernel version 6.2.

=== I/O ===
- PCI Express 5.0
- Direct Media Interface 4.0
- 8-channel DDR5 ECC memory support up to DDR5-4800, up to 2 DIMMs per channel
- On-package High Bandwidth Memory 2.0e memory as L4 cache on Xeon Max models
- Compute Express Link 1.1

=== Die configurations ===
Sapphire Rapids come in two varieties: the low-core-count variety uses a single die (MCC), and the high-core-count variety uses multiple dies on a single package (XCC).

==== XCC multi-die configuration ====
- Multi-chiplet chip with four tiles linked by 2.5D Embedded Multi-die Interconnect Bridges. Each tile is a 400mm^{2} system on a chip, providing both compute cores and I/O.
  - Each tile contains 15 Golden Cove cores, and a single UPI link
  - Each tile's memory controller provides two channels of DDR5 ECC supporting 4 DIMMs (2 per channel) and 1 TB of memory with a maximum of 8 channels, 16 DIMMs, and 4 TB memory across 4 tiles
  - A tile provides up to 32 PCIe 5.0 lanes, but one of the eight PCIe controllers of a CPU is usually reserved for DMI, resulting in a maximum of 112 non-chipset lanes. This maximum is only reached in the W-3400 series processors, while the server processors have 80 (20 per tile).

== List of Sapphire Rapids processors ==
=== Sapphire Rapids-HBM (High Bandwidth Memory/Xeon Max Series) ===
Xeon Max processors contain 64 GB of High Bandwidth Memory.

Model number	Cores (threads)	Base clock	Turbo Boost		Smart cache	TDP	Maxi- mum scala- bility	Registered DDR5 w. ECC support	UPI links	Release MSRP (USD)
Model number	Cores (threads)	Base clock	All core	Single core	Smart cache	TDP	Maxi- mum scala- bility	Registered DDR5 w. ECC support	UPI links	Release MSRP (USD)
9480	56 (112)	1.9 GHz	2.6 GHz	3.5 GHz	112.5 MB	350 W	2S	4800 MT/s	4	$12980
9470	52 (104)	2.0 GHz	2.7 GHz	3.5 GHz	105.0 MB	350 W	2S	4800 MT/s	4	$11590
9468	48 (96)	2.1 GHz	2.6 GHz	3.5 GHz	105.0 MB	350 W	2S	4800 MT/s	4	$9900
9460	40 (80)	2.2 GHz	2.7 GHz	3.5 GHz	97.5 MB	350 W	2S	4800 MT/s	3	$8750
9462	32 (64)	2.7 GHz	3.1 GHz	3.5 GHz	75.0 MB	350 W	2S	4800 MT/s	3	$7995

=== Sapphire Rapids-SP (Scalable Performance) ===
With its maximum of 60 cores, Sapphire Rapids-SP competes with AMD's Epyc 8004/9004 Genoa with up to 96 cores and Bergamo with up to 128 cores. Sapphire Rapids Xeon server processors are scalable from single-socket configurations up to 8 socket configurations.

Suffixes to denote:

- +: Includes 1 of each of the four accelerators: DSA, IAA, QAT, DLB
- H: Database and analytics workloads, supports 4S (Xeon Gold) and/or 8S (Xeon Platinum) configurations and includes all of the accelerators
- M: Media transcode workloads
- N: Network/5G/Edge workloads (High TPT/Low Latency), some are uniprocessor
- P: Cloud and infrastructure as a service (IaaS) workloads
- Q: Liquid cooling
- S: Storage & Hyper-converged infrastructure (HCI) workloads
- T: Long-life use/High thermal case
- U: Uniprocessor (some workload-specific SKUs may also be uniprocessor)
- V: Optimized for cloud and software as a service (SaaS) workloads, some are uniprocessor
- Y: Speed Select Technology-Performance Profile (SST-PP) enabled (some workload-specific SKUs may also support SST-PP)
- Y+: Speed Select Technology-Performance Profile (SST-PP) enabled and includes 1 of each of the accelerators.

Model number	Cores (threads)	Base clock	Turbo Boost		Smart cache	TDP	Maxi- mum scala- bility	Registered DDR5 w. ECC support	UPI links	Release MSRP (USD)
Model number	Cores (threads)	Base clock	All core	Single core	Smart cache	TDP	Maxi- mum scala- bility	Registered DDR5 w. ECC support	UPI links	Release MSRP (USD)
Xeon Platinum (8400)
8490H	60 (120)	1.9 GHz	2.9 GHz	3.5 GHz	112.5 MB	350 W	8S	4800 MT/s	4	$17000
8488C	48 (96)	2.4 GHz	3.2 GHz	3.8 GHz	105.0 MB	385 W	2S	4800 MT/s	?	
8487C	56 (112)	1.9 GHz	?	3.8 GHz	105.0 MB	350 W	2S	4800 MT/s	?	
8481C	56 (112)	2.0 GHz	2.9 GHz	3.8 GHz	105.0 MB	350 W	2S	4800 MT/s	?	
8480+	56 (112)	2.0 GHz	3.0 GHz	3.8 GHz	105.0 MB	350 W	2S	4800 MT/s	4	$10710
8480C	56 (112)	2.0 GHz	3.0 GHz	3.8 GHz	105.0 MB	350 W	2S	4800 MT/s	4	
8478C	48 (96)	2.2 GHz	?	3.8 GHz	105.0 MB	350 W	2S	4800 MT/s	?	
8475B	48 (96)	2.7 GHz	3.2 GHz	3.8 GHz	97.5 MB	350 W	2S	4800 MT/s	?	
8474C	48 (96)	2.1 GHz	?	3.8 GHz	97.5 MB	350 W	2S	4800 MT/s	?	
8473C	52 (104)	2.1 GHz	2.9 GHz	3.8 GHz	105.0 MB	350 W	2S	4800 MT/s	?	
8471N	52 (104)	1.8 GHz	2.8 GHz	3.6 GHz	97.5 MB	300 W	1S	4800 MT/s	4	$5171
8470Q	52 (104)	2.1 GHz	3.2 GHz	3.8 GHz	105.0 MB	350 W	2S	4800 MT/s	4	$9410
8470N	52 (104)	1.7 GHz	2.7 GHz	3.6 GHz	97.5 MB	300 W	2S	4800 MT/s	4	$9520
8470	52 (104)	2.0 GHz	3.0 GHz	3.8 GHz	105.0 MB	350 W	2S	4800 MT/s	4	$9359
8469C	48 (96)	2.6 GHz	3.1 GHz	3.8 GHz	97.5 MB	350 W	2S	4800 MT/s	?	
8468V	48 (96)	2.4 GHz	2.9 GHz	3.8 GHz	97.5 MB	330 W	2S	4800 MT/s	3	$7121
8468H	48 (96)	2.1 GHz	3.0 GHz	3.8 GHz	105.0 MB	330 W	8S	4800 MT/s	4	$13923
8468	48 (96)	2.1 GHz	3.1 GHz	3.8 GHz	105.0 MB	350 W	2S	4800 MT/s	4	$7214
8465C	52 (104)	2.1 GHz	2.9 GHz	3.8 GHz	105.0 MB	350 W	2S	4800 MT/s	?	
8462Y+	32 (64)	2.8 GHz	3.6 GHz	4.1 GHz	60.0 MB	300 W	2S	4800 MT/s	3	$5945
8461V	48 (96)	2.2 GHz	2.8 GHz	3.7 GHz	97.5 MB	300 W	1S	4800 MT/s	0	$4491
8460Y+	40 (80)	2.0 GHz	2.8 GHz	3.7 GHz	105.0 MB	300 W	2S	4800 MT/s	4	$5558
8460H	40 (80)	2.2 GHz	3.1 GHz	3.8 GHz	105.0 MB	330 W	8S	4800 MT/s	4	$10710
8458P	44 (88)	2.7 GHz	3.2 GHz	3.8 GHz	82.5 MB	350 W	2S	4800 MT/s	3	$7121
8454H	32 (64)	2.1 GHz	2.7 GHz	3.4 GHz	82.5 MB	270 W	8S	4800 MT/s	4	$6540
8452Y	36 (72)	2.0 GHz	2.8 GHz	3.2 GHz	67.5 MB	300 W	2S	4800 MT/s	4	$3995
8450H	28 (56)	2.0 GHz	2.6 GHz	3.5 GHz	75.0 MB	250 W	8S	4800 MT/s	4	$4708
8444H	16 (32)	2.9 GHz	3.2 GHz	4.0 GHz	45.0 MB	270 W	8S	4800 MT/s	4	$4234
8432C	40 (80)	?	?	3.8 GHz	?	350 W	2S	4800 MT/s	?	
8422C	36 (72)	?	?	?	?		2S	4800 MT/s	?	
Xeon Gold (5400 and 6400)
6462C	32 (64)	3.3 GHz	?	?	60.0 MB	?	2S	4800 MT/s	?	
6458Q	32 (64)	3.1 GHz	4.0 GHz		60.0 MB	350 W	2S	4800 MT/s	3	$6416
6456C	32 (64)	2.9 GHz	3.3 GHz	4.1 GHz	60.0 MB	280 W	2S	4800 MT/s	?	
6454S	32 (64)	2.2 GHz	2.8 GHz	3.4 GHz	60.0 MB	270 W	2S	4800 MT/s	4	$3157
6448Y	32 (64)	2.1 GHz	3.0 GHz	4.1 GHz	60.0 MB	225 W	2S	4800 MT/s	3	$3583
6448H	32 (64)	2.4 GHz	3.2 GHz	4.1 GHz	60.0 MB	250 W	4S	4800 MT/s	3	$3658
6444Y	16 (32)	3.6 GHz	4.0 GHz	4.1 GHz	45.0 MB	270 W	2S	4800 MT/s	3	$3622
6442Y	24 (48)	2.6 GHz	3.3 GHz	4.0 GHz	60.0 MB	225 W	2S	4800 MT/s	3	$2878
6438Y+	32 (64)	2.0 GHz	2.8 GHz	4.0 GHz	60.0 MB	205 W	2S	4800 MT/s	3	$3141
6438N	32 (64)	2.0 GHz	2.7 GHz	3.6 GHz	60.0 MB	205 W	2S	4800 MT/s	3	$3351
6438M	32 (64)	2.2 GHz	2.8 GHz	3.9 GHz	60.0 MB	205 W	2S	4800 MT/s	3	$3273
6434H	8 (16)	3.7 GHz	4.1 GHz		22.5 MB	195 W	4S	4800 MT/s	3	$3070
6434	8 (16)	3.7 GHz	4.1 GHz		22.5 MB	195 W	2S	4800 MT/s	3	$2607
6430	32 (64)	2.1 GHz	2.6 GHz	3.4 GHz	60.0 MB	270 W	2S	4400 MT/s	3	$2128
6428N	32 (64)	1.8 GHz	2.5 GHz	3.8 GHz	60.0 MB	185 W	2S	4000 MT/s	3	$3200
6426Y	16 (32)	2.5 GHz	3.3 GHz	4.1 GHz	37.5 MB	185 W	2S	4800 MT/s	3	$1517
6421N	32 (64)	1.8 GHz	2.6 GHz	3.6 GHz	60.0 MB	185 W	1S	4400 MT/s	3	$2368
6418H	24 (48)	2.1 GHz	2.9 GHz	4.0 GHz	60.0 MB	185 W	4S	4800 MT/s	3	$2065
6416H	18 (36)	2.2 GHz	2.9 GHz	4.2 GHz	45.0 MB	165 W	4S	4800 MT/s	3	$1444
6414U	32 (64)	2.0 GHz	2.6 GHz	3.4 GHz	60.0 MB	250 W	1S	4800 MT/s	0	$2296
5420+	28 (56)	2.0 GHz	2.7 GHz	4.1 GHz	52.5 MB	205 W	2S	4400 MT/s	3	$1848
5418Y	24 (48)	2.0 GHz	2.8 GHz	3.8 GHz	45.0 MB	185 W	2S	4400 MT/s	3	$1483
5418N	24 (48)	1.8 GHz	2.6 GHz	3.8 GHz	45.0 MB	165 W	2S	4000 MT/s	3	$1664
5416S	16 (32)	2.0 GHz	2.8 GHz	4.0 GHz	30.0 MB	150 W	2S	4400 MT/s	3	$944
5415+	8 (16)	2.9 GHz	3.6 GHz	4.1 GHz	22.5 MB	150 W	2S	4400 MT/s	3	$1066
5412U	24 (48)	2.1 GHz	2.9 GHz	3.9 GHz	45.0 MB	185 W	1S	4400 MT/s	0	$1113
5411N	24 (48)	1.9 GHz	2.8 GHz	3.9 GHz	45.0 MB	165 W	1S	4400 MT/s	3	$1388
Xeon Silver (4400)
4416+	20 (40)	2.0 GHz	2.9 GHz	3.9 GHz	37.5 MB	165 W	2S	4000 MT/s	2	$1176
4410Y	12 (24)	2.0 GHz	2.8 GHz	3.9 GHz	30.0 MB	150 W	2S	4000 MT/s	2	$563
4410T	10 (20)	2.7 GHz	3.4 GHz	4.0 GHz	26.25 MB	150 W	2S	4000 MT/s	2	$624
Xeon Bronze (3400, 3500)
3508U	8 (8)	2.1 GHz	2.2 GHz		22.5 MB	125 W	1S	4400 MT/s	0	$415-$425
3408U	8 (8)	1.8 GHz	1.9 GHz		22.5 MB	125 W	1S	4000 MT/s	0	$415-$425

=== Sapphire Rapids-WS (Workstation) ===
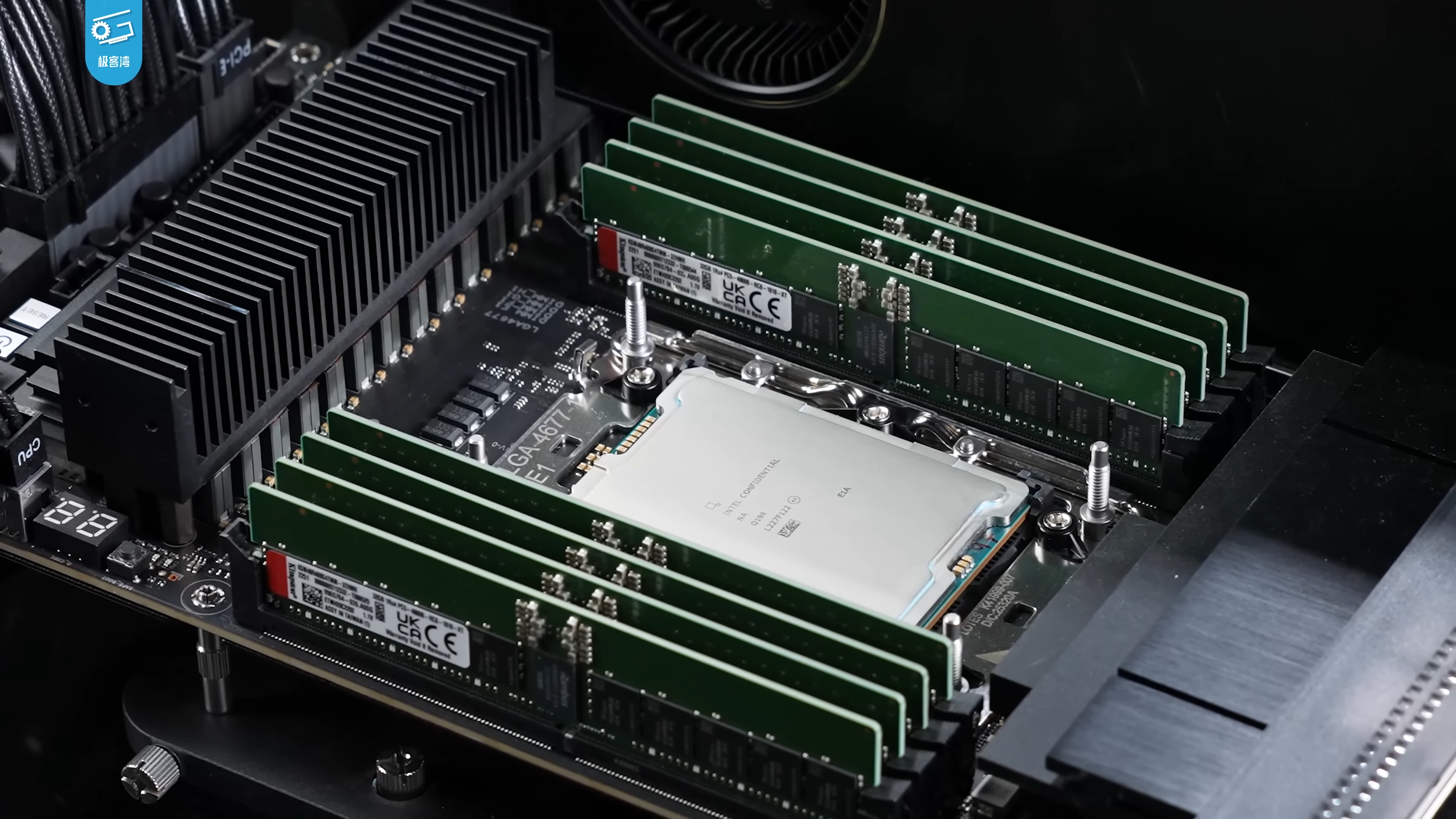
56-core CPU Intel Xeon w-3495X equipped with 256 GiB DDR5 RAM

With its maximum of 60 cores, Sapphire Rapids-WS competes with AMD's Threadripper PRO 5000WX Chagall with up to 64 cores. Like Intel's Core product segmentation into i3, i5, i7 and i9, Sapphire Rapids-WS is labeled Xeon w3, w5, w7 and w9. Sapphire Rapids-WS was unveiled in February 2023, and was made available for OEMs in March. CPUs with "X" suffix have its multiplier unlocked for overclocking.

- No suffix letter: Locked clock multiplier
- X: Unlocked clock multiplier (adjustable with no ratio limit)
- Xeon W-2400/2500 uses a monolithic design and supports up to 64 PCI Express 5.0 lanes, while Xeon W-3400/3500 uses a chiplet design and supports up to 112 lanes. Both support 8 DMI 4.0 lanes.

Model	Cores (threads)	Clock rate (GHz)			Smart cache	Registered DDR5 w. ECC support	TDP		Release MSRP (USD)
Model	Cores (threads)	Base	Turbo Boost		Smart cache	Registered DDR5 w. ECC support	Base	Turbo	Release MSRP (USD)
Model	Cores (threads)	Base	2.0	3.0	Smart cache	Registered DDR5 w. ECC support	Base	Turbo	Release MSRP (USD)
Xeon W-3400 (SPR-112L)
w9-3495X	56 (112)	1.9	4.6	4.8	105 MB	8-channel 4800 MT/s; 4 TB	350 W	420 W	$5889
w9-3475X	36 (72)	2.2	4.6	4.8	82.5 MB	8-channel 4800 MT/s; 4 TB	300 W	420 W	$3739
w7-3465X	28 (56)	2.5	4.6	4.8	75.0 MB	8-channel 4800 MT/s; 4 TB	300 W	360 W	$2889
w7-3455	24 (48)	2.5	4.6	4.8	67.5 MB	8-channel 4800 MT/s; 4 TB	270 W	324 W	$2489
w7-3445	20 (40)	2.6	4.6	4.8	52.5 MB	8-channel 4800 MT/s; 4 TB	270 W	324 W	$1989
w5-3435X	16 (32)	3.1	4.5	4.7	45.0 MB	8-channel 4800 MT/s; 4 TB	270 W	324 W	$1589
w5-3425	12 (24)	3.2	4.4	4.6	30.0 MB	8-channel 4800 MT/s; 4 TB	270 W	324 W	$1189
Xeon W-2400 (SPR-64L)
w7-2495X	24 (48)	2.5	4.6	4.8	45.0 MB	4-channel 4800 MT/s; 2 TB	225 W	270 W	$2189
w7-2475X	20 (40)	2.6	4.6	4.8	37.5 MB	4-channel 4800 MT/s; 2 TB	225 W	270 W	$1789
w5-2465X	16 (32)	3.1	4.5	4.7	33.75 MB	4-channel 4800 MT/s; 2 TB	200 W	240 W	$1389
w5-2455X	12 (24)	3.2	4.4	4.6	30.0 MB	4-channel 4800 MT/s; 2 TB	200 W	240 W	$1039
w5-2445	10 (20)	3.1	4.4	4.6	26.25 MB	4-channel 4800 MT/s; 2 TB	175 W	210 W	$839
w3-2435	8 (16)	3.1	4.3	4.5	22.5 MB	4-channel 4400 MT/s; 2 TB	165 W	198 W	$669
w3-2425	6 (12)	3.0	4.2	4.4	15.0 MB	4-channel 4400 MT/s; 2 TB	130 W	156 W	$529
w3-2423	6 (12)	2.1	4.0	4.2	15.0 MB	4-channel 4400 MT/s; 2 TB	120 W	144 W	$359

Model	Cores (threads)	Clock rate (GHz)			Smart cache	Registered DDR5 w. ECC support	TDP		Release MSRP (USD)
Model	Cores (threads)	Base	Turbo Boost		Smart cache	Registered DDR5 w. ECC support	Base	Turbo	Release MSRP (USD)
Model	Cores (threads)	Base	2.0	3.0	Smart cache	Registered DDR5 w. ECC support	Base	Turbo	Release MSRP (USD)
Xeon W-3500 (SPR-112L Refresh)
w9-3595X	60 (120)	2.0	4.6	4.8	112.5 MB	8-channel 4800 MT/s; 4 TB	385 W	462 W	$5889
w9-3575X	44 (88)	2.2	4.6	4.8	97.5 MB	8-channel 4800 MT/s; 4 TB	340 W	408 W	$3789
w7-3565X	32 (64)	2.5	4.6	4.8	82.5 MB	8-channel 4800 MT/s; 4 TB	335 W	402 W	$2689
w7-3555	28 (56)	2.7	4.6	4.8	75.0 MB	8-channel 4800 MT/s; 4 TB	325 W	390 W	$2339
w7-3545	24 (48)	2.7	4.6	4.8	67.5 MB	8-channel 4800 MT/s; 4 TB	315 W	372 W	$2039
w5-3535X	20 (40)	2.9	4.6	4.8	52.5 MB	8-channel 4800 MT/s; 4 TB	300 W	360 W	$1689
w5-3525	16 (32)	3.2	4.6	4.8	45.0 MB	8-channel 4800 MT/s; 4 TB	290 W	348 W	$1389
Xeon W-2500 (SPR-64L Refresh)
w7-2595X	26 (52)	2.8	4.6	4.8	48.75 MB	4-channel 4800 MT/s; 2 TB	250 W	300 W	$2039
w7-2575X	22 (44)	3.0	4.6	4.8	45.0 MB	4-channel 4800 MT/s; 2 TB	250 W	300 W	$1689
w5-2565X	18 (36)	3.2	4.6	4.8	37.5 MB	4-channel 4800 MT/s; 2 TB	240 W	288 W	$1339
w5-2555X	14 (28)	3.3	4.6	4.8	33.75 MB	4-channel 4800 MT/s; 2 TB	210 W	252 W	$1069
w5-2545	12 (24)	3.5	4.5	4.7	30.0 MB	4-channel 4800 MT/s; 2 TB	210 W	252 W	$889
w3-2535	10 (20)	3.5	4.4	4.6	26.25 MB	4-channel 4800 MT/s; 2 TB	185 W	222 W	$739
w3-2525	8 (16)	3.5	4.3	4.5	22.5 MB	4-channel 4800 MT/s; 2 TB	175 W	210 W	$609

== See also ==
- Intel's process–architecture–optimization model
- Intel's tick–tock model
- List of Intel CPU microarchitectures

Atom (ULV)		Node name	Pentium/Core						
Microarch.	Step	Node name	Microarch.	Step					
		600 nm	P6	Pentium Pro (133 MHz)					
		500 nm	P6	Pentium Pro (150 MHz)					
		350 nm	P6	Pentium Pro (166–200 MHz)					
		350 nm	P6	Klamath					
		250 nm	P6	Deschutes					
		250 nm	P6	Katmai	NetBurst				
		180 nm	P6	Coppermine	Willamette				
		130 nm	P6	Tualatin	Northwood				
		130 nm	Pentium M	Banias	Northwood		NetBurst(HT)		NetBurst(×2)
		90 nm	Pentium M	Dothan	Prescott	⇨	Prescott‑2M	⇨	Smithfield
		90 nm	Pentium M	Dothan	~~Tejas~~	→	⇩	→	~~Cedarmill (Tejas)~~
		65 nm	Pentium M	Yonah	~~Nehalem (NetBurst)~~		Cedar Mill	⇨	Presler
		65 nm	Core	Merom	4 cores on mainstream desktop, DDR3 introduced				
Bonnell	Bonnell	45 nm	Core	Penryn					
Bonnell	Bonnell	45 nm	Nehalem	Nehalem	HT reintroduced, integrated MC, PCH; L3-cache introduced, 256 KB L2-cache/core				
Bonnell	Saltwell	32 nm	Nehalem	Westmere	Introduced GPU on same package and AES-NI				
Bonnell	Saltwell	32 nm	Sandy Bridge	Sandy Bridge	On-die ring bus, no more non-UEFI motherboards				
Silvermont	Silvermont	22 nm	Sandy Bridge	Ivy Bridge					
Silvermont	Silvermont	22 nm	Haswell	Haswell	Fully integrated voltage regulator				
Silvermont	Airmont	14 nm	Haswell	Broadwell					
Silvermont	Airmont	14 nm	Skylake	Skylake	DDR4 introduced on mainstream desktop				
Goldmont		14 nm	Skylake	Kaby Lake					
Goldmont		14 nm	Skylake	Coffee Lake	6 cores on mainstream desktop				
Goldmont		14 nm	Skylake	Amber Lake	Mobile-only				
Goldmont Plus		14 nm	Skylake	Whiskey Lake	Mobile-only				
Goldmont Plus		14 nm	Skylake	Coffee Lake Refresh	8 cores on mainstream desktop				
Goldmont Plus		14 nm	Skylake	Comet Lake	10 cores on mainstream desktop				
Goldmont Plus		14 nm	Sunny Cove	Cypress Cove (Rocket Lake)	Backported Sunny Cove microarchitecture for 14 nm				
Tremont		10 nm	Skylake	Palm Cove (Cannon Lake)	Mobile-only				
Tremont		10 nm	Sunny Cove	Sunny Cove (Ice Lake)	512 KB L2-cache/core				
Tremont		10 nm	Sunny Cove	Willow Cove (Tiger Lake)	X^{e} graphics engine				
Gracemont		Intel 7 (10 nm ESF)	Golden Cove	Golden Cove (Alder Lake)	Hybrid, DDR5, PCIe 5.0				
Gracemont		Intel 7 (10 nm ESF)	Golden Cove	Raptor Cove (Raptor Lake)					
Crestmont		Intel 4	Redwood Cove	Meteor Lake	Mobile-only; NPU, chiplet architecture				
Crestmont		Intel 3	Redwood Cove	Arrow Lake-U					
Skymont		TSMC N3B	Lion Cove	Lunar Lake	Low power mobile only (9–30 W)				
Skymont		TSMC N3B	Lion Cove	Arrow Lake					
Darkmont		Intel 18A	Cougar Cove	Panther Lake					
Arctic Wolf		Intel 18A and/or TSMC N2P	Coyote Cove	Nova Lake					
