= LGA 7529 =

CPU socket designed by Intel

- Type: LGA-ZIF
- Chip form factors: Flip-chip
- Contacts: 7529
- Processors: Granite Rapids; Sierra Forest
- Predecessor: LGA 4677
- Successor: LGA 9324
- Memory support: DDR5
- This article is part of the CPU socket series

LGA 7529 is a zero insertion force flip-chip land grid array (LGA) socket designed by Intel which supports the Sierra Forest line of E-core Xeon processors, designed for heavily multithreaded cloud workloads, as well as the Granite Rapids line of P-core Xeon microprocessors, designed for mainstream usage.

The socket is also expected to support the mainstream successor to Granite Rapids, Diamond Rapids. The first pictures of the Intel Birch Stream platform were posted on January 31, 2023, by Yuuki_Ans. They showcased a dual LGA 7529 socket engineering sample motherboard. The Birch Stream platform is expected to support 12 channels of DDR5 memory per socket, for a total of 24 channels of DDR5 memory on a dual socket system.

Intel launched the first processors to use the LGA 7529 socket on September 24, 2024, with their launch of their Granite Rapids line of CPUs. This product line has two classes of CPUs: one using the twelve-channel LGA 7529 socket, referred to as the Xeon 6900P series, and the other using the smaller eight-channel LGA 4710 socket, referred to as the Xeon 6700P series.
