= List of Intel Xeon processors (Skylake-based) =

== "Skylake-D" (14 nm) ==
- All models support: MMX, SSE, SSE2, SSE3, SSSE3, SSE4.1, SSE4.2, AVX2, AVX-512, F16C, Enhanced Intel SpeedStep Technology (EIST), Intel 64, XD bit (an NX bit implementation), TXT, Intel VT-x, Intel EPT, Intel VT-d, Hyper-threading, Turbo Boost, AES-NI, TSX-NI, Intel MPX, Smart Cache, ECC memory.
- SoC peripherals include 24× USB (10× 3.0, 14× 2.0), 14× SATA 3.0, 4× Integrated 10 GbE LAN (except D-2191), UART, GPIO, and 32 lanes of PCI Express 3.0 in ×16, ×8 and ×4 configurations.
- Support for up to 8 DIMMs of DDR4 memory, up to 64 GB per DIMM (512 GB).
- I (such as D-2161I): Integrated Intel Ethernet
- T (such as D-2183T): high temperature support or extended reliability offerings
- N (such as D-2187NT): Intel Ethernet and Intel QuickAssist Technology
- Package size: 42.5 × 55 mm

=== Xeon D-21xx (uniprocessor, SoC) ===
Model number	sSpec number	Cores (threads)	Frequency	Turbo Boost all-core/max turbo	L2 cache	L3 cache	TDP	Socket	I/O bus	Memory	Release date	Part number(s)	Release price (USD)
Edge Server and Cloud
Xeon D-2141I	SR3ZV (M1)	8 (16)	2.2 GHz	2.7/3.0 GHz	8 × 1 MB	11 MB	65 W	FC-BGA 2518	DMI 3.0	4× DDR4-2133	February 2018	FH8067303784100	$555
Xeon D-2161I	SR3ZN (M1)	12 (24)	2.2 GHz	2.8/3.0 GHz	12 × 1 MB	16.5 MB	90 W	FC-BGA 2518	DMI 3.0	4× DDR4-2133	February 2018	FH8067303534104	$962
Xeon D-2191	SRCK4 (M1)	18 (36)	1.6 GHz	2.2/3.0 GHz	18 × 1 MB	24.75 MB	86 W	FC-BGA 2518	DMI 3.0	4× DDR4-2400	February 2018	FH8067303930700	$2406
Network Edge and Storage
Xeon D-2123IT	SR3ZW (M1)	4 (8)	2.2 GHz	2.7/3.0 GHz	4 × 1 MB	8 MB	60 W	FC-BGA 2518	DMI 3.0	4× DDR4-2400	February 2018	FH8067303784201	$213
Xeon D-2142IT	SR3ZZ (M1)	8 (16)	1.9 GHz	2.5/3.0 GHz	8 × 1 MB	11 MB	65 W	FC-BGA 2518	DMI 3.0	4× DDR4-2133	February 2018	FH8067303871000	$438
Xeon D-2143IT	SR3ZU (M1)	8 (16)	2.2 GHz	2.7/3.0 GHz	8 × 1 MB	11 MB	65 W	FC-BGA 2518	DMI 3.0	4× DDR4-2133	February 2018	FH8067303782900	$566
Xeon D-2163IT	SR3ZP (M1)	12 (24)	2.1 GHz	2.6/3.0 GHz	12 × 1 MB	17 MB	75 W	FC-BGA 2518	DMI 3.0	4× DDR4-2133	February 2018	FH8067303692003	$930
Xeon D-2173IT	SR3ZS (M1)	14 (28)	1.7 GHz	2.3/3.0 GHz	14 × 1 MB	19 MB	70 W	FC-BGA 2518	DMI 3.0	4× DDR4-2133	February 2018	FH8067303782702	$1229
Xeon D-2183IT	SR3ZQ (M1)	16 (32)	2.2 GHz	2.8/3.0 GHz	16 × 1 MB	22 MB	100 W	FC-BGA 2518	DMI 3.0	4× DDR4-2400	February 2018	FH8067303782501	$1764
Integrated Intel QuickAssist Technology
Xeon D-2145NT	SR3ZT (M1)	8 (16)	1.9 GHz	2.5/3.0 GHz	8 × 1 MB	11 MB	65 W	FC-BGA 2518	DMI 3.0	4× DDR4-2133	February 2018	FH8067303782801	$502
Xeon D-2146NT	SR3ZR (M1)	8 (16)	2.3 GHz	2.5/3.0 GHz	8 × 1 MB	11 MB	80 W	FC-BGA 2518	DMI 3.0	4× DDR4-2133	February 2018	FH8067303782601	$641
Xeon D-2166NT	SR3ZX (M1)	12 (24)	2 GHz	2.3/3.0 GHz	12 × 1 MB	17 MB	85 W	FC-BGA 2518	DMI 3.0	4× DDR4-2133	February 2018	FH8067303784301	$1005
Xeon D-2177NT	SR3ZY (M1)	14 (28)	1.9 GHz	2.3/3.0 GHz	14 × 1 MB	19 MB	105 W	FC-BGA 2518	DMI 3.0	4× DDR4-2666	February 2018	FH8067303870800	$1443
Xeon D-2187NT	SR3ZM (M1)	16 (32)	2 GHz	2.4/3.0 GHz	16 × 1 MB	22 MB	110 W	FC-BGA 2518	DMI 3.0	4× DDR4-2666	February 2018	FH8067303534005	$1989

== "Skylake-S" (14 nm) ==
=== Xeon E3-12xx v5 (uniprocessor) ===
- All models support: MMX, SSE, SSE2, SSE3, SSSE3, SSE4.1, SSE4.2, AVX2, F16C, Enhanced Intel SpeedStep Technology (EIST), Intel 64, XD bit (an NX bit implementation), TXT, Intel VT-x, Intel EPT, Intel VT-d, Hyper-threading(except E3-1220 v5 and E3-1225 v5), Turbo Boost, AES-NI, TSX-NI, Intel MPX, Smart Cache, ECC memory.
- AVX-512 is not supported.

Model number	sSpec number	Cores	Frequency	Turbo	L2 cache	L3 cache	GPU model	GPU frequency	TDP	Socket	I/O bus	Release date	Part number(s)	Release price (USD)
Quad Core
Xeon E3-1220 v5	SR2CQ (R0); SR2LG (R0)	4	3 GHz	3.5 GHz	4 × 256 KB	8 MB	—N/a	—N/a	80 W	LGA 1151	DMI 3.0	October 2015	CM8066201921804; BX80662E31220V5	$193
Xeon E3-1225 v5	SR2CS (R0); SR2LJ (R0)	4	3.3 GHz	1/2/3/4 (Note: Max turbo bins for 4, 3, 2, 1 active cores respectively (depending on the number of CPU cores in the processor). Additional frequency = turbo bins * Base clock (100 MHz for Sandy Bridge, Ivy Bridge, Haswell, Broadwell, and Skylake processors).)	4 × 256 KB	8 MB	HD Graphics P530	400–1150 MHz	80 W	LGA 1151	DMI 3.0	October 2015	CM8066201922605; BX80662E31225V5	$213
Xeon E3-1230 v5	SR2CN (R0); SR2LE (R0)	4	3.4 GHz	3.8 GHz	4 × 256 KB	8 MB	—N/a	—N/a	80 W	LGA 1151	DMI 3.0	October 2015	CM8066201921713; BX80662E31230V5	$250 $261
Xeon E3-1240 v5	SR2CM (R0); SR2LD (R0)	4	3.5 GHz	3.9 GHz	4 × 256 KB	8 MB	—N/a	—N/a	80 W	LGA 1151	DMI 3.0	October 2015	CM8066201921715; BX80662E31240V5	$272 $282
Xeon E3-1245 v5	SR2CU (R0); SR2LL (R0)	4	3.5 GHz	3.9 GHz	4 × 256 KB	8 MB	HD Graphics P530	400–1150 MHz	80 W	LGA 1151	DMI 3.0	October 2015	CM8066201934913; BX80662E31245V5	$284
Xeon E3-1270 v5	SR2CP (R0); SR2LF (R0)	4	3.6 GHz	4.0 GHz	4 × 256 KB	8 MB	—N/a	—N/a	80 W	LGA 1151	DMI 3.0	October 2015	CM8066201921712; BX80662E31270V5	$328 $339
Xeon E3-1275 v5	SR2CT (R0); SR2LK (R0)	4	3.6 GHz	1/2/3/4	4 × 256 KB	8 MB	HD Graphics P530	400–1150 MHz	80 W	LGA 1151	DMI 3.0	October 2015	CM8066201934909; BX80662E31275V5	$339 $350
Xeon E3-1280 v5	SR2CL (R0); SR2LC (R0)	4	3.7 GHz	4.0 GHz	4 × 256 KB	8 MB	—N/a	—N/a	80 W	LGA 1151	DMI 3.0	October 2015	CM8066201921607	$612
Quad Core, low power
Xeon E3-1260L v5	SR2CR (R0); SR2LH (R0)	4	2.9 GHz	3.9 GHz	4 × 256 KB	8 MB	—N/a	—N/a	45 W	LGA 1151	DMI 3.0	October 2015	CM8066201921903	$294
Xeon E3-1268L v5	SR2LQ (R0)	4	2.4 GHz	7/8/9/10	4 × 256 KB	8 MB	HD Graphics P530	350–1000 MHz	35 W	LGA 1151	DMI 3.0	October 2015	CM8066201937901	$377
Quad Core, ultra-low power
Xeon E3-1235L v5	SR2CV (R0); SR2LM (R0)	4	2 GHz	3.0 GHz	4 × 256 KB	6 MB	HD Graphics P530	400–1000 MHz	25 W	LGA 1151	DMI 3.0	October 2015	CM8066201935807	$250
Xeon E3-1240L v5	SR2CW (R0); SR2LN (R0)	4	2.1 GHz	3.2 GHz	4 × 256 KB	8 MB	—N/a	—N/a	25 W	LGA 1151	DMI 3.0	October 2015	CM8066201935808	$278

== "Skylake-H" (14 nm) Mobile Workstation ==
=== Xeon E3-15xx v5 (uniprocessor) ===
- AVX-512 is not supported.

Model number	sSpec number	Cores	Frequency	Turbo	L2 cache	L3 cache	GPU model	GPU frequency	TDP	Socket	I/O bus	Release date	Part number(s)	Release price (USD)
Quad Core
Xeon E3-1585 v5	SR2RB (N0)	4	3.5 GHz	3.9 GHz	4 × 256 KB	8 MB	Iris Pro Graphics P580	350–1150 MHz	65 W	BGA 1440	DMI 3.0	May 2016	JQ8066201935710	$556
Quad Core, mobile
Xeon E3-1505M v5	SR2FN (R0)	4	2.8 GHz	5/6/7/9	4 × 256 KB	8 MB	HD Graphics P530	350–1050 MHz	45 W	BGA 1440	DMI 3.0	September 2015	CL8066202191415	$434
Xeon E3-1515M v5	SR2QT (N0)	4	2.8 GHz	6/7/8/9	4 × 256 KB	8 MB	Iris Pro Graphics P580	350–1000 MHz	45 W	BGA 1440	DMI 3.0	January 2016	JQ8066202193208	$489
Xeon E3-1535M v5	SR2FM (R0)	4	2.9 GHz	5/6/7/9	4 × 256 KB	8 MB	HD Graphics P530	350–1050 MHz	45 W	BGA 1440	DMI 3.0	September 2015	CL8066202191412	$623
Xeon E3-1545M v5	SR2QU (N0)	4	2.9 GHz	6/7/8/9	4 × 256 KB	8 MB	Iris Pro Graphics P580	350–1050 MHz	45 W	BGA 1440	DMI 3.0	January 2016	JQ8066202193209	$679
Xeon E3-1575M v5	SR2QV (N0)	4	3 GHz	6/7/8/9	4 × 256 KB	8 MB	Iris Pro Graphics P580	350–1100 MHz	45 W	BGA 1440	DMI 3.0	January 2016	JQ8066202193210	$1207
Quad Core, low power
Xeon E3-1565L v5	SR2R8 (N0)	4	2.5 GHz	3.5 GHz	4 × 256 KB	8 MB	Iris Pro Graphics P580	350–1050 MHz	35 W	BGA 1440	DMI 3.0	May 2016	JQ8066201935626	$417
Xeon E3-1585L v5	SR2R9 (N0)	4	3 GHz	3.7 GHz	4 × 256 KB	8 MB	Iris Pro Graphics P580	350–1150 MHz	45 W	BGA 1440	DMI 3.0	May 2016	JQ8066201935627	$445
Quad Core, low power, embedded
Xeon E3-1505L v5	SR2E0 (R0)	4	2 GHz	2.8 GHz	4 × 256 KB	8 MB	HD Graphics P530	350–1000 MHz	25 W	BGA 1440	DMI 3.0	Q4 2015	CL8066202399804	$433
Xeon E3-1558L v5	SR2TU (N0)	4	1.9 GHz	3.3 GHz	4 × 256 KB	8 MB	Iris Pro Graphics P555	650–1000 MHz	45 W	BGA 1440	DMI 3.0	May 2016	JQ8066202811101	$396
Xeon E3-1578L v5	SR2TT (N0)	4	2 GHz	3.4 GHz	4 × 256 KB	8 MB	Iris Pro Graphics P580	700–1000 MHz	45 W	BGA 1440	DMI 3.0	May 2016	JQ8066202811001	$449

== "Skylake-W" (14 nm) Workstation ==
=== Xeon W-21xx (uniprocessor) ===
- All models support: MMX, SSE, SSE2, SSE3, SSSE3, SSE4.1, SSE4.2, AVX, AVX2, AVX-512, FMA3, MPX, Enhanced Intel SpeedStep Technology (EIST), Intel 64, XD bit (an NX bit implementation), Intel VT-x, Intel VT-d, Turbo Boost (excluding W-2102 and W-2104), Hyper-threading (excluding W-2102 and W-2104), AES-NI, Intel TSX-NI, Smart Cache.
- PCI Express lanes: 48
- Supports up to 8 DIMMs of DDR4 memory, maximum 512 GB.
- Models with the B suffix were released exclusively for Apple's Mac Pro and iMac Pro lines

Model number	sSpec number	Cores (threads)	Frequency	Turbo Boost all-core/max turbo	L2 cache	L3 cache	TDP	Socket	I/O bus	Memory	Release date	Part number(s)	Release price (USD)
Xeon W-2102	SR3LG (U0)	4 (4)	2.9 GHz	N/A	4 × 1 MB	8.25 MB	120 W	LGA 2066	DMI 3.0	4× DDR4-2400	29 August 2017	CD8067303532802	$202
Xeon W-2104	SR3LH (U0)	4 (4)	3.2 GHz	N/A	4 × 1 MB	8.25 MB	120 W	LGA 2066	DMI 3.0	4× DDR4-2400	29 August 2017	CD8067303532903	$255
Xeon W-2123	SR3LJ (U0)	4 (8)	3.6 GHz	3.7/3.9 GHz	4 × 1 MB	8.25 MB	120 W	LGA 2066	DMI 3.0	4× DDR4-2666	29 August 2017	CD8067303533002	$294
Xeon W-2125	SR3LM (U0)	4 (8)	4 GHz	4.4/4.5 GHz	4 × 1 MB	8.25 MB	120 W	LGA 2066	DMI 3.0	4× DDR4-2666	29 August 2017	CD8067303533303	$444
Xeon W-2133	SR3LL (U0)	6 (12)	3.6 GHz	3.8/3.9 GHz	6 × 1 MB	8.25 MB	140 W	LGA 2066	DMI 3.0	4× DDR4-2666	29 August 2017	CD8067303533204	$617
Xeon W-2135	SR3LN (U0)	6 (12)	3.7 GHz	4.4/4.5 GHz	6 × 1 MB	8.25 MB	140 W	LGA 2066	DMI 3.0	4× DDR4-2666	29 August 2017	CD8067303533403	$835
Xeon W-2140B	SR3LK (H0)	8 (16)	3.2 GHz	3.9/4.2 GHz	8 × 1 MB	11.00 MB	120 W	LGA 2066	DMI 3.0	4× DDR4-2666	21 December 2017		OEM for Apple
Xeon W-2145	SR3LQ (U0)	8 (16)	3.7 GHz	4.3/4.5 GHz	8 × 1 MB	11.00 MB	140 W	LGA 2066	DMI 3.0	4× DDR4-2666	29 August 2017	CD8067303533601	$1113
Xeon W-2150B	SR3LS (H0)	10 (20)	3 GHz	4.0/4.5 GHz	10 × 1 MB	13.75 MB	120 W	LGA 2066	DMI 3.0	4× DDR4-2666	21 December 2017		OEM for Apple
Xeon W-2155	SR3LR (U0)	10 (20)	3.3 GHz	4.0/4.5 GHz	10 × 1 MB	13.75 MB	140 W	LGA 2066	DMI 3.0	4× DDR4-2666	29 August 2017	CD8067303533703	$1440
Xeon W-2170B	SR3W3 (H0)	14 (28)	2.5 GHz	3.3/4.3 GHz	14 × 1 MB	19.25 MB	140 W	LGA 2066	DMI 3.0	4× DDR4-2666	21 December 2017		OEM for Apple
Xeon W-2175	SR3W2 (M0)	14 (28)	2.5 GHz	3.3/4.3 GHz	14 × 1 MB	19.25 MB	140 W	LGA 2066	DMI 3.0	4× DDR4-2666	15 October 2017	CD8067303842300	$1947
Xeon W-2191B	SR3RW (H0)	18 (36)	2.3 GHz	3.2/4.3 GHz	18 × 1 MB	24.75 MB	140 W	LGA 2066	DMI 3.0	4× DDR4-2666	21 December 2017		OEM for Apple
Xeon W-2195	SR3RX (M0)	18 (36)	2.3 GHz	3.2/4.3 GHz	18 × 1 MB	24.75 MB	140 W	LGA 2066	DMI 3.0	4× DDR4-2666	29 August 2017	CD8067303805901	$2553

=== Xeon W-31xx (uniprocessor) ===
- All models support: MMX, SSE, SSE2, SSE3, SSSE3, SSE4.1, SSE4.2, AVX, AVX2, AVX-512, FMA3, MPX, Enhanced Intel SpeedStep Technology (EIST), Intel 64, XD bit (an NX bit implementation), Intel VT-x, Intel VT-d, Turbo Boost, Hyper-threading, AES-NI, Intel TSX-NI, Smart Cache.
- PCI Express lanes: 48
- Supports up to 12 DIMMs of DDR4 memory, maximum 512 GB.
- Featured an unlocked clock multiplier

Model number	sSpec number	Cores (threads)	Frequency	Turbo Boost all-core/max turbo 2.0/max turbo 3.0	L2 cache	L3 cache	TDP	Socket	I/O bus	Memory	Release date	Part number(s)	Release price (USD)
Xeon W-3175X	SRF6L (H0)	28 (56)	3.1 GHz	3.8/4.3/4.5 GHz	28 × 1 MB	38.5 MB	255 W	LGA 3647	DMI 3.0	6× DDR4-2666	Q4 2018	BX80673W3175X	$2999

== "Skylake-SP" (14 nm) Scalable Performance ==
- Support for up to 12 DIMMs of DDR4 memory per CPU socket
- Xeon Platinum supports up to eight sockets; Xeon Gold supports up to four sockets; Xeon Silver and Bronze support up to two sockets
- Xeon Platinum, Gold 61XX, and Gold 5122 have two AVX-512 FMA units per core; Xeon Gold 51XX (except 5122), Silver, and Bronze have a single AVX-512 FMA unit per core
- -F: integrated OmniPath fabric
- -M: Support 1536 GB RAM per socket vs 768 GB for non-M SKUs
- -P: integrated FPGA
- -T: High thermal-case and extended reliability

=== Xeon Bronze and Silver (dual processor) ===
- Xeon Bronze 31XX has no hyper-threading or Turbo Boost support
- Xeon Bronze 31XX supports DDR4-2133 MHz RAM; Xeon Silver 41XX supports DDR4-2400 MHz RAM
- Xeon Bronze 31XX and Xeon Silver 41XX support two UPI links at 9.6 GT/s

Model number	sSpec number	Cores (threads)	Frequency	Turbo Boost all-core/max turbo	L2 cache	L3 cache	TDP	Socket	I/O bus	Memory	Release date	Part number(s)	Release price (USD)
Xeon Bronze 3104	SR3GM (U0)	6 (6)	1.7 GHz	N/A	6 × 1 MB	8.25 MB	85 W	LGA 3647	2× 9.6 GT/s UPI	6× DDR4-2133	11 July 2017	CD8067303562000; BX806733104	$223 $213
Xeon Bronze 3106	SR3GL (U0)	8 (8)	1.7 GHz	N/A	8 × 1 MB	11.00 MB	85 W	LGA 3647	2× 9.6 GT/s UPI	6× DDR4-2133	11 July 2017	CD8067303561900; BX806733106	$306 $316
Xeon Silver 4106H	SR44Y (U0)	8 (16)	1.8 GHz	2.1/3.0 GHz	8 × 1 MB	11.00 MB	85 W		2× 9.6 GT/s UPI	6× DDR4-2400	Q3 2018	CD8067303964400	
Xeon Silver 4108	SR3GJ (U0)	8 (16)	1.8 GHz	2.1/3.0 GHz	8 × 1 MB	11.00 MB	85 W	LGA 3647	2× 9.6 GT/s UPI	6× DDR4-2400	11 July 2017	CD8067303561500; BX806734108	$417 $427
Xeon Silver 4109T	SR3GP (U0)	8 (16)	2 GHz	2.3/3.0 GHz	8 × 1 MB	11.00 MB	70 W	LGA 3647	2× 9.6 GT/s UPI	6× DDR4-2400	11 July 2017	CD8067303562200	$501
Xeon Silver 4110	SR3GH (U0)	8 (16)	2.1 GHz	2.4/3.0 GHz	8 × 1 MB	11.00 MB	85 W	LGA 3647	2× 9.6 GT/s UPI	6× DDR4-2400	11 July 2017	CD8067303561400; BX806734110	$501 $511
Xeon Silver 4112	SR3GN (U0)	4 (8)	2.6 GHz	2.9/3.0 GHz	4 × 1 MB	8.25 MB	85 W	LGA 3647	2× 9.6 GT/s UPI	6× DDR4-2400	11 July 2017	CD8067303562100; BX806734112	$473 $483
Xeon Silver 4114	SR3GK (U0)	10 (20)	2.2 GHz	2.5/3.0 GHz	10 × 1 MB	13.75 MB	85 W	LGA 3647	2× 9.6 GT/s UPI	6× DDR4-2400	11 July 2017	CD8067303561800; BX806734114	$694 $704
Xeon Silver 4114T	SR3MM (U0)	10 (20)	2.2 GHz	2.5/3.0 GHz	10 × 1 MB	13.75 MB	85 W	LGA 3647	2× 9.6 GT/s UPI	6× DDR4-2400	Q3 2017	CD8067303645300	$773
Xeon Silver 4116	SR3HQ (M0)	12 (24)	2.1 GHz	2.4/3.0 GHz	12 × 1 MB	16.50 MB	85 W	LGA 3647	2× 9.6 GT/s UPI	6× DDR4-2400	11 July 2017	CD8067303567200; BX806734116	$1002 $1012
Xeon Silver 4116T	SR3MQ (U0)	12 (24)	2.1 GHz	2.4/3.0 GHz	12 × 1 MB	16.50 MB	85 W	LGA 3647	2× 9.6 GT/s UPI	6× DDR4-2400	Q3 2017	CD8067303645400	$1112
Xeon Silver 4123	SR3VW (M0)	8 (16)	3 GHz	?/3.2 GHz	8 × 1 MB	11.00 MB	105 W	LGA 3647	2× 9.6 GT/s UPI	6× DDR4-2400	Q1 2018	CD8067303810503	

=== Xeon Gold (quad processor) ===
- Xeon Gold 51XX has two UPIs at 10.4 GT/s; Xeon Gold 61XX has three UPIs at 10.4 GT/s
- Xeon Gold 51XX support DDR4-2400 MT/s RAM (except 5122); Xeon Gold 5122 and 61XX support DDR4-2666 MT/s RAM

Model number	sSpec number	Cores (threads)	Frequency	Turbo Boost all-core/max turbo	L2 cache	L3 cache	TDP	Socket	I/O bus	Memory	Release date	Part number(s)	Release price (USD)
Xeon Gold 5115	SR3GB (M0)	10 (20)	2.4 GHz	2.8/3.2GHz	10 × 1 MB	13.75 MB	85 W	LGA 3647	2× 10.4 GT/s UPI	6× DDR4-2400	11 July 2017	CD8067303535601	$1221
Xeon Gold 5117	SR37S (H0)	14 (28)	2 GHz	2.3/2.8GHz	14 × 1 MB	19.25 MB	105 W	LGA 3647	2× 10.4 GT/s UPI	6× DDR4-2400	11 July 2017	CD8067303317801	OEM
Xeon Gold 5117F	SR3KM (H0)	14 (28)	2 GHz	2.3/2.8GHz	14 × 1 MB	19.25 MB	113 W	LGA 3647	2× 10.4 GT/s UPI	6× DDR4-2400	11 July 2017	CD8067303680501	OEM
Xeon Gold 5118	SR3GF (M0)	12 (24)	2.3 GHz	2.7/3.2GHz	12 × 1 MB	16.50 MB	105 W	LGA 3647	2× 10.4 GT/s UPI	6× DDR4-2400	11 July 2017	CD8067303536100	$1273
Xeon Gold 5119T	SR3MN (M0)	14 (28)	1.9 GHz	2.3/3.2GHz	14 × 1 MB	19.25 MB	85 W	LGA 3647	2× 10.4 GT/s UPI	6× DDR4-2400	11 July 2017	CD8067303567703	$1555
Xeon Gold 5120	SR3GD (M0)	14 (28)	2.2 GHz	2.6/3.2GHz	14 × 1 MB	19.25 MB	105 W	LGA 3647	2× 10.4 GT/s UPI	6× DDR4-2400	11 July 2017	CD8067303535900; BX806735120	$1555 $1561
Xeon Gold 5120T	SR3GC (M0)	14 (28)	2.2 GHz	2.6/3.2GHz	14 × 1 MB	19.25 MB	105 W	LGA 3647	2× 10.4 GT/s UPI	6× DDR4-2400	11 July 2017	CD8067303535700	$1727
Xeon Gold 5122	SR3AT (H0)	4 (8)	3.6 GHz	3.7/3.7GHz	4 × 1 MB	16.50 MB	105 W	LGA 3647	2× 10.4 GT/s UPI	6× DDR4-2666	11 July 2017	CD8067303330702; BX806735122	$1221 $1227
Xeon Gold 6122	SRCKF (H0)	20 (40)	1.8 GHz	2.5/3.7GHz	20 × 1 MB	27.5 MB	120 W	LGA 3647	3× 10.4 GT/s UPI	6× DDR4-2666	Q2 2018	CD8067303927400	$2002
Xeon Gold 6126	SR3B3 (H0)	12 (24)	2.6 GHz	3.3/3.7GHz	12 × 1 MB	19.25 MB	125 W	LGA 3647	3× 10.4 GT/s UPI	6× DDR4-2666	11 July 2017	CD8067303405900	$1776
Xeon Gold 6126F	SR3KE (H0)	12 (24)	2.6 GHz	3.3/3.7GHz	12 × 1 MB	19.25 MB	135 W	LGA 3647	2× 10.4 GT/s UPI	6× DDR4-2666	11 July 2017	CD8067303593400	$1931
Xeon Gold 6126T	SR3J9 (H0)	12 (24)	2.6 GHz	3.3/3.7GHz	12 × 1 MB	19.25 MB	125 W	LGA 3647	3× 10.4 GT/s UPI	6× DDR4-2666	11 July 2017	CD8067303593100	$1865
Xeon Gold 6127M		16 (32)	2.2 GHz	2.2/2.2GHz	16 × 1 MB	22 MB	145 W	LGA 3647	3× 10.4 GT/s UPI	6× DDR4-2666			OEM
Xeon Gold 6128	SR3J4 (H0)	6 (12)	3.4 GHz	3.7/3.7GHz	6 × 1 MB	19.25 MB	115 W	LGA 3647	3× 10.4 GT/s UPI	6× DDR4-2666	11 July 2017	CD8067303592600; BX806736128	$1691 $1697
Xeon Gold 6130	SR3B9 (H0)	16 (32)	2.1 GHz	2.8/3.7GHz	16 × 1 MB	22.00 MB	125 W	LGA 3647	3× 10.4 GT/s UPI	6× DDR4-2666	11 July 2017	CD8067303409000; BX806736130	$1900
Xeon Gold 6130F	SR3KD (H0)	16 (32)	2.1 GHz	2.8/3.7GHz	16 × 1 MB	22.00 MB	135 W	LGA 3647	3× 10.4 GT/s UPI	6× DDR4-2666	11 July 2017	CD8067303593300	$2049
Xeon Gold 6130T	SR3J8 (H0)	16 (32)	2.1 GHz	2.8/3.7GHz	16 × 1 MB	22.00 MB	125 W	LGA 3647	3× 10.4 GT/s UPI	6× DDR4-2666	11 July 2017	CD8067303593000	$1988
Xeon Gold 6130H	SR450 (H0)	16 (32)	2.1 GHz	3.1/3.7GHz	16 × 1 MB	22.00 MB	125 W	LGA 3647	3× 10.4 GT/s UPI	6× DDR4-2666			
Xeon Gold 6131		8 (16)	4 GHz	4.1/4.3GHz	8 × 1 MB	24.75 MB	205 W	LGA 3647	3× 10.4 GT/s UPI	6× DDR4-2666			
Xeon Gold 6132	SR3J3 (H0)	14 (28)	2.6 GHz	2.9/3.7GHz	14 × 1 MB	19.25 MB	140 W	LGA 3647	3× 10.4 GT/s UPI	6× DDR4-2666	11 July 2017	CD8067303592500	$2111
Xeon Gold 6133	SR3M1 (H0)	20 (40)	2.5 GHz	2.8/3.0GHz	20 × 1 MB	27.5 MB	150 W	LGA 3647	3× 10.4 GT/s UPI	6× DDR4-2666			OEM
Xeon Gold 6134	SR3AR (H0)	8 (16)	3.2 GHz	3.7/3.7GHz	8 × 1 MB	24.75 MB	130 W	LGA 3647	3× 10.4 GT/s UPI	6× DDR4-2666	11 July 2017	CD8067303330302; BX806736134	$2214 $2220
Xeon Gold 6134M	SR3AS (H0)	8 (16)	3.2 GHz	3.7/3.7GHz	8 × 1 MB	24.75 MB	130 W	LGA 3647	3× 10.4 GT/s UPI	6× DDR4-2666	11 July 2017	CD8067303330402	$5217
Xeon Gold 6135		8 (16)	3.4 GHz	4.0/4.2GHz	8 × 1 MB	24.75 MB	155 W	LGA 3647	3× 10.4 GT/s UPI	6× DDR4-2666			OEM
Xeon Gold 6135M		8 (16)	3.5 GHz	4.0/4.0GHz	8 × 1 MB	24.75 MB	155 W	LGA 3647	3× 10.4 GT/s UPI	6× DDR4-2666			OEM
Xeon Gold 6136	SR3B2 (H0)	12 (24)	3 GHz	3.6/3.7GHz	12 × 1 MB	24.75 MB	150 W	LGA 3647	3× 10.4 GT/s UPI	6× DDR4-2666	11 July 2017	CD8067303405800	$2460
Xeon Gold 6137	SR3M3 (H0)	8 (16)	3.9 GHz	4.1/4.1GHz	8 × 1 MB	24.75 MB	205 W	LGA 3647	3× 10.4 GT/s UPI	6× DDR4-2666			OEM
Xeon Gold 6137M		8 (16)	3.9 GHz	4.1/4.1GHz	8 × 1 MB	24.75 MB	205 W	LGA 3647	3× 10.4 GT/s UPI	6× DDR4-2666			OEM
Xeon Gold 6138	SR3B5 (H0)	20 (40)	2 GHz	2.7/3.7GHz	20 × 1 MB	27.50 MB	125 W	LGA 3647	3× 10.4 GT/s UPI	6× DDR4-2666	11 July 2017	CD8067303406100; BX806736138	$2612 $2618
Xeon Gold 6138F	SR3KK (H0)	20 (40)	2 GHz	2.7/3.7GHz	20 × 1 MB	27.50 MB	135 W	LGA 3647	2× 10.4 GT/s UPI	6× DDR4-2666	11 July 2017	CD8067303593900	$2767
Xeon Gold 6138P	SRCUG (H0)	20 (40)	2 GHz	2.7/3.7GHz	20 × 1 MB	27.50 MB	195 W	LGA 3647	2× 10.4 GT/s UPI	6× DDR4-2666	Q2 2018	CM8067303824101	$4937
Xeon Gold 6138T	SR3J7 (H0)	20 (40)	2 GHz	2.7/3.7GHz	20 × 1 MB	27.50 MB	125 W	LGA 3647	3× 10.4 GT/s UPI	6× DDR4-2666	11 July 2017	CD8067303592900	$2742
Xeon Gold 6139	SR3G3 (H0)	18 (36)	2.3 GHz	3.1/3.7GHz	18 × 1 MB	24.75 MB	135 W	LGA 3647	3× 10.4 GT/s UPI	6× DDR4-2666	11 July 2017		OEM
Xeon Gold 6139M	SR3FV (H0)	18 (36)	2.3 GHz	3.1/3.7GHz	18 × 1 MB	24.75 MB	135 W	LGA 3647	3× 10.4 GT/s UPI	6× DDR4-2666	11 July 2017		OEM
Xeon Gold 6140	SR3AX (H0)	18 (36)	2.3 GHz	3.0/3.7GHz	18 × 1 MB	24.75 MB	140 W	LGA 3647	3× 10.4 GT/s UPI	6× DDR4-2666	11 July 2017	CD8067303405200; BX806736140	$2445 $2451
Xeon Gold 6140M	SR3AZ (H0)	18 (36)	2.3 GHz	3.0/3.7GHz	18 × 1 MB	24.75 MB	140 W	LGA 3647	3× 10.4 GT/s UPI	6× DDR4-2666	11 July 2017	CD8067303405500	$5448
Xeon Gold 6142	SR3AY (H0)	16 (32)	2.6 GHz	3.3/3.7GHz	16 × 1 MB	22.00 MB	150 W	LGA 3647	3× 10.4 GT/s UPI	6× DDR4-2666	11 July 2017	CD8067303405400; BX806736142	$2946 $2952
Xeon Gold 6142F	SR3KH (H0)	16 (32)	2.6 GHz	3.3/3.7GHz	16 × 1 MB	22.00 MB	160 W	LGA 3647	2× 10.4 GT/s UPI	6× DDR4-2666	11 July 2017	CD8067303593700	$3101
Xeon Gold 6142M	SR3B1 (H0)	16 (32)	2.6 GHz	3.3/3.7GHz	16 × 1 MB	22.00 MB	150 W	LGA 3647	3× 10.4 GT/s UPI	6× DDR4-2666	11 July 2017	CD8067303405700	$5949
Xeon Gold 6143		16 (32)	2.8 GHz	3.5/3.7GHz	16 × 1 MB	22.00 MB	165 W	LGA 3647	3× 10.4 GT/s UPI	6× DDR4-2666			OEM
Xeon Gold 6144	SR3MB (H0); SR3TR (H0)	8 (16)	3.5 GHz	4.1/4.2GHz	8 × 1 MB	24.75 MB	150 W	LGA 3647	3× 10.4 GT/s UPI	6× DDR4-2666	Q3 2017	CD8067303657302; CD8067303843000	$2925
Xeon Gold 6145	SR3G4 (H0)	20 (40)	2 GHz	2.7/3.7GHz	20 × 1 MB	27.50 MB	145 W	LGA 3647	3× 10.4 GT/s UPI	6× DDR4-2666	2017	CD8067303528200	OEM
Xeon Gold 6146	SR3MA (H0)	12 (24)	3.2 GHz	3.9/4.2GHz	12 × 1 MB	24.75 MB	165 W	LGA 3647	3× 10.4 GT/s UPI	6× DDR4-2666	11 July 2017	CD8067303657201	$3286
Xeon Gold 6147M		20 (40)	2.5 GHz	2.8/3.0GHz	20 × 1 MB	27.50 MB	150 W	LGA 3647	3× 10.4 GT/s UPI	6× DDR4-2666			
Xeon Gold 6148	SR3B6 (H0)	20 (40)	2.4 GHz	3.1/3.7GHz	20 × 1 MB	27.50 MB	150 W	LGA 3647	3× 10.4 GT/s UPI	6× DDR4-2666	11 July 2017	CD8067303406200; BX806736148	$3072 $3078
Xeon Gold 6148F	SR3KJ (H0)	20 (40)	2.4 GHz	3.1/3.7GHz	20 × 1 MB	27.50 MB	150 W	LGA 3647	2× 10.4 GT/s UPI	6× DDR4-2666	11 July 2017	CD8067303593800	$3227
Xeon Gold 6149	SR3G2 (H0)	16 (32)	3.1 GHz	3.3/3.4GHz	16 × 1 MB	22.00 MB	205 W	LGA 3647	3× 10.4 GT/s UPI	6× DDR4-2666	2017		OEM
Xeon Gold 6150	SR37K (H0)	18 (36)	2.7 GHz	3.4/3.7GHz	18 × 1 MB	24.75 MB	165 W	LGA 3647	3× 10.4 GT/s UPI	6× DDR4-2666	11 July 2017	CD8067303328000	$3358
Xeon Gold 6151	SR3BG (H0)	18 (36)	3 GHz	3.4/3.7GHz	18 × 1 MB	24.75 MB	205 W		3× 10.4 GT/s UPI	6× DDR4-2666			OEM
Xeon Gold 6152	SR3B4 (H0)	22 (44)	2.1 GHz	2.8/3.7GHz	22 × 1 MB	30.25 MB	140 W	LGA 3647	3× 10.4 GT/s UPI	6× DDR4-2666	11 July 2017	CD8067303406000; BX806736152	$3655 $3661
Xeon Gold 6154	SR3J5 (H0)	18 (36)	3 GHz	3.7/3.7GHz	18 × 1 MB	24.75 MB	200 W	LGA 3647	3× 10.4 GT/s UPI	6× DDR4-2666	11 July 2017	CD8067303592700	$3543
Xeon Gold 6155		20 (40)	3 GHz	3.3/3.5GHz	20 × 1 MB	27.50 MB	200 W	LGA 3647	3× 10.4 GT/s UPI	6× DDR4-2666			OEM
Xeon Gold 6159		22 (44)	2.2 GHz	2.7/3.0GHz	22 × 1 MB	30.25 MB	145 W	LGA 3647	3× 10.4 GT/s UPI	6× DDR4-2666			OEM
Xeon Gold 6161	SR3G7 (H0)	22 (44)	2.2 GHz	2.7/3.0GHz	22 × 1 MB	30.25 MB	165 W	LGA 3647	3× 10.4 GT/s UPI	6× DDR4-2666	2017	CD8067303532100	OEM
Xeon Gold 6162	SRCKE (H0)	24 (48)	1.9 GHz	2.5/3.5GHz	24 × 1 MB	33 MB	150 W	LGA 3647	3× 10.4 GT/s UPI	6× DDR4-2666	Q3 2018	CD8067303927300	$3115
Xeon Gold 6164		24 (48)	1.9 GHz	2.5/3.5GHz	24 × 1 MB	33 MB	150 W	LGA 3647	3× 10.4 GT/s UPI	6× DDR4-2666			OEM

=== Xeon Platinum (octa processor) ===
- Xeon Platinum has three UPIs at 10.4 GT/s.
- Xeon Platinum supports DDR4-2666 MT/s RAM (except 8136 and 8167M).

Model number	sSpec number	Cores (threads)	Frequency	Turbo Boost all-core/max turbo	L2 cache	L3 cache	TDP	Socket	I/O bus	Memory	Release date	Part number(s)	Release price (USD)
Xeon Platinum P-8124	SR2YS (B1)	18 (36)	3 GHz	3.4/3.5 GHz	18 × 1 MB	24.75 MB	240 W	LGA 3647	3× 10.4 GT/s UPI	6× DDR4-2666			OEM (Note: Not available for purchase whatsoever to the general public. Apparently exclusive to Amazon AWS.)
Xeon Platinum 8124M	SRD1Y (H0)	18 (36)	3 GHz	3.4/3.5 GHz	18 × 1 MB	24.75 MB	240 W	LGA 3647	3× 10.4 GT/s UPI	6× DDR4-2666			OEM
Xeon Platinum P-8136	SR2YN (B1)	28 (56)	2 GHz	2.7/3.5 GHz	28 × 1 MB	38.5 MB	165 W	LGA 3647	3× 10.4 GT/s UPI	6× DDR4-2400			OEM
Xeon Platinum 8151	SR3M0 (H0)	12 (24)	3.4 GHz	4.0/4.0 GHz	12 × 1 MB	24.75 MB	240 W	LGA 3647	3× 10.4 GT/s UPI	6× DDR4-2666			
Xeon Platinum 8153	SR3BA (H0)	16 (32)	2 GHz	2.5/2.8 GHz	16 × 1 MB	22.00 MB	125 W	LGA 3647	3× 10.4 GT/s QPI	6× DDR4-2666	11 July 2017	CD8067303408900	$3115
Xeon Platinum 8156	SR3AV (H0)	4 (8)	3.6 GHz	3.7/3.7 GHz	4 × 1 MB	16.50 MB	105 W	LGA 3647	3× 10.4 GT/s UPI	6× DDR4-2666	11 July 2017	CD8067303368800	$7007
Xeon Platinum 8157M		24 (48)	2.3 GHz	3.3/3.6 GHz	24 × 1 MB	33 MB	145 W	LGA 3647	3× 10.4 GT/s UPI	6× DDR4-2666			
Xeon Platinum 8158	SR3B7 (H0)	12 (24)	3 GHz	3.7/3.7 GHz	12 × 1 MB	24.75 MB	150 W	LGA 3647	3× 10.4 GT/s UPI	6× DDR4-2666	11 July 2017	CD8067303406500	$7007
Xeon Platinum 8160	SR3B0 (H0)	24 (48)	2.1 GHz	2.8/3.7 GHz	24 × 1 MB	33.00 MB	150 W	LGA 3647	3× 10.4 GT/s UPI	6× DDR4-2666	11 July 2017	CD8067303405600; BX806738160	$4702 $4708
Xeon Platinum 8160F	SR3B8 (H0)	24 (48)	2.1 GHz	2.8/3.7 GHz	24 × 1 MB	33.00 MB	160 W	LGA 3647	3× 10.4 GT/s UPI	6× DDR4-2666	11 July 2017	CD8067303406600	$4856
Xeon Platinum 8160H	SR44Z (H0)	24 (48)	2.1 GHz	2.8/3.7 GHz	24 × 1 MB	33.00 MB	150 W	LGA 3647	3× 10.4 GT/s UPI	6× DDR4-2666			OEM
Xeon Platinum 8160M	SR3B8 (H0)	24 (48)	2.1 GHz	2.8/3.7 GHz	24 × 1 MB	33.00 MB	150 W	LGA 3647	3× 10.4 GT/s UPI	6× DDR4-2666	11 July 2017	CD8067303406600	$7704
Xeon Platinum 8160T	SR3J6 (H0)	24 (48)	2.1 GHz	2.8/3.7 GHz	24 × 1 MB	33.00 MB	150 W	LGA 3647	3× 10.4 GT/s UPI	6× DDR4-2666	11 July 2017	CD8067303592800	$4936
Xeon Platinum 8163	SR3G1 (H0)	24 (48)	2.4 GHz	2.7/3.1 GHz	24 × 1 MB	33.00 MB	165 W	LGA 3647	3× 10.4 GT/s UPI	6× DDR4-2666	2017	CD8067303527200	OEM
Xeon Platinum 8164	SR3BB (H0)	26 (52)	2 GHz	2.7/3.7 GHz	26 × 1 MB	35.75 MB	150 W	LGA 3647	3× 10.4 GT/s UPI	6× DDR4-2666	11 July 2017	CD8067303408800; BX806738164	$6114 $6120
Xeon Platinum 8165		24 (48)	2.3 GHz	3.0/3.7 GHz	24 × 1 MB	33 MB	165 W	LGA 3647	3× 10.4 GT/s UPI	6× DDR4-2666			OEM
Xeon Platinum 8167M	SR3A0 (H0)	26 (52)	2 GHz	2.4/2.4 GHz	26 × 1 MB	35.75 MB	165 W	LGA 3647	3× 10.4 GT/s UPI	6× DDR4-2400	2017	CD8067303180701	OEM
Xeon Platinum 8168	SR37J (H0)	24 (48)	2.7 GHz	3.4/3.7 GHz	24 × 1 MB	33.00 MB	205 W	LGA 3647	3× 10.4 GT/s UPI	6× DDR4-2666	11 July 2017	CD8067303327701	$5890
Xeon Platinum 8170	SR37H (H0)	26 (52)	2.1 GHz	2.8/3.7 GHz	26 × 1 MB	35.75 MB	165 W	LGA 3647	3× 10.4 GT/s UPI	6× DDR4-2666	11 July 2017	CD8067303327601; BX806738170	$7405 $7411
Xeon Platinum 8170M	SR3BD (H0)	26 (52)	2.1 GHz	2.8/3.7 GHz	26 × 1 MB	35.75 MB	165 W	LGA 3647	3× 10.4 GT/s UPI	6× DDR4-2666	11 July 2017	CD8067303319201	$10,409
Xeon Platinum 8171M	SR37I (H0)	26 (52)	2.3 GHz	3.0/3.8 GHz	26 × 1 MB	35.75 MB	185 W	LGA 3647	3× 10.4 GT/s UPI	6× DDR4-2666			OEM
Xeon Platinum 8172M	SR39Q (H0)	26 (52)	2.6 GHz	3.0/3.7 GHz	26 × 1 MB	35.75 MB	205 W	LGA 3647	3× 10.4 GT/s UPI	6× DDR4-2666			OEM
Xeon Platinum 8173M	SR37Q (H0)	28 (56)	2 GHz	2.7/3.5 GHz	28 × 1 MB	38.50 MB	165 W	LGA 3647	3× 10.4 GT/s UPI	6× DDR4-2666	2017	CD8067303172400	OEM
Xeon Platinum 8174	SR3ZA	24 (48)	3.1 GHz	3.8/3.9 GHz	24 × 1 MB	33.00 MB	240 W	LGA 3647	3× 10.4 GT/s UPI	6× DDR4-2666	Q3, 2017		OEM
Xeon Platinum 8175M	SR3FU (H0)	24 (48)	2.5 GHz	3.1/3.5 GHz	24 × 1 MB	33.00 MB	240 W	LGA 3647	3× 10.4 GT/s UPI	6× DDR4-2666			OEM
Xeon Platinum 8176	SR37A (H0)	28 (56)	2.1 GHz	2.8/3.8 GHz	28 × 1 MB	38.50 MB	165 W	LGA 3647	3× 10.4 GT/s UPI	6× DDR4-2666	11 July 2017	CD8067303314700	$8790
Xeon Platinum 8176F	SR3MK (H0)	28 (56)	2.1 GHz	2.8/3.8 GHz	28 × 1 MB	38.50 MB	173 W	LGA 3647	3× 10.4 GT/s UPI	6× DDR4-2666	Q3, 2017	CD8067303694600	$8874
Xeon Platinum 8176M	SR37U (H0)	28 (56)	2.1 GHz	2.8/3.8 GHz	28 × 1 MB	38.50 MB	165 W	LGA 3647	3× 10.4 GT/s UPI	6× DDR4-2666	11 July 2017	CD8067303133605	$11,722
Xeon Platinum 8179M		26 (52)	2.4 GHz	3.0/3.5 GHz	26 × 1 MB	35.75 MB	240 W	LGA 3647	3× 10.4 GT/s UPI	6× DDR4-2666			OEM
Xeon Platinum 8180	SR377 (H0)	28 (56)	2.5 GHz	3.2/3.8 GHz	28 × 1 MB	38.50 MB	205 W	LGA 3647	3× 10.4 GT/s UPI	6× DDR4-2666	11 July 2017	CD8067303314400; BX806738180	$10,009
Xeon Platinum 8180M	SR37T (H0)	28 (56)	2.5 GHz	3.2/3.8 GHz	28 × 1 MB	38.50 MB	205 W	LGA 3647	3× 10.4 GT/s UPI	6× DDR4-2666	11 July 2017	CD8067303192101	$13,011
