= Vector Pascal =

Open source Pascal compiler

In computing Vector Pascal is an open-source compiler implemented in Java that extends the Pascal programming language. It is designed to support efficient expression of algorithms using the SIMD model of computation. It imports into Pascal abstraction mechanisms derived from Iverson's APL programming language. In particular it extends all operators to work on vectors of data. The type system is also extended to handle pixels and dimensional analysis.

== Supported architectures ==
- ARM64
- Intel 486
- Intel Xeon-Phi (auto parallelising Xeon Phi compile)
- AMD Opteron processor, the Opteron compiler supports multi-core parallelism
- Pentium 4
- Athlon
- Sony PlayStation 2 Emotion Engine
- The Cell processor (PS3)
- Advanced Vector Extensions (Intel Sandy Bridge, AMD Bulldozer (microarchitecture))

== Standards ==
The syntax generally follows that of Turbo Pascal and includes all features of the ISO standard (ISO 7185-1990) except where overridden by Turbo Pascal. Features of Extended Pascal (an extended Pascal standard was created as ISO/IEC 10206) are also incorporated.
