= Zen 6 =

AMD 3-nanometre processor microarchitecture

AMD Zen 6
General information
- Launching: Server SP7; November 10, 2026; 12 days ago Server SP8; H1 2027; Desktop; H1 2027
- Designed by: AMD
- Common manufacturer: TSMC
- CPUID code: Family 1Ah

Physical specifications
- Cores: Mobile: up to 26 Desktop: up to 24 HEDT: 36 to 144 Server: 8 to 256
- Memory (RAM): DDR5
- Sockets: Desktop; Socket AM5; Server; SP7; SP8

Cache
- L1 cache: 80 KB (per core): 32 KB instructions; 48 KB data
- L2 cache: 1 MB (per core)
- L3 cache: 48 MB (per CCD); 128 MB (per CCD on Venice-X)

Architecture and classification
- Technology node: TSMC N2P (CCD) to TSMC N6 (IOD)
- Microarchitecture: Zen
- Instruction set: AMD64 (x86-64)
- Extensions: Crypto AES, SHA; SIMD MMX-plus, SSE, SSE2, SSE3, SSSE3, SSE4.1, SSE4.2, SSE4A, FMA3, AVX, AVX2, AVX-512, AVX-VNNI, AVX-IFMA, BMM, FRED; Virtualization AMD-V

Products, models, variants
- Core names: Zen 6; Morpheus; Zen 6c; Monarch; Zen 6 LP; TBD
- Product code names: Desktop; Olympic Ridge; Medusa Point; Server; Venice; Venice-X; Venice LP; Verano; HEDT/Workstation; Mustang Peak; Mobile; Bumblebee; Medusa Point; Medusa Halo; Gator Range
- Brand names: Ryzen; Ryzen AI; Epyc; Threadripper

History
- Predecessor: Zen 5
- Successor: Zen 7

Support status
- Launched

Zen 6 ("Morpheus") is a CPU microarchitecture from AMD, shown on their roadmap in July 2024. It is the successor to Zen 5 and is believed to use TSMC's 6 nm and 2 nm processes. Desktop processors will be codenamed "Olympic Ridge", expected to be released under the Ryzen 10000 name, the Ryzen Threadripper (HEDT or Workstation) processors are codenamed "Mustang Peak", while Epyc server processors will be codenamed "Venice", "Venice-X", "Venice LP" & "Verano". The mobile processors include several lineup codenames: "Bumblebee" at the low-end, "Medusa Point" for the mainstream lineup, "Medusa Halo" represents a high-end APU with a large iGPU, and "Gator Range" providing the highest mobile performance.

Zen 6 is expected to release in late 2026 to early 2027. It is expected that each Core Complex Die (CCD) will contain up to 12 cores each, enabling a maximum of 24 cores (48 threads) for consumer platform chips and 256 cores (512 threads) on server platform chips.

The architecture is confirmed to introduce new instruction extensions, including BMM, AVX_NE_CONVERT, AVX_IFMA, AVX_VNNI_INT8, AVX512_FP16, and Flexible Return and Event Delivery (FRED).

== Zen 6c ==
Like with the previous two Zen generations, Zen 6 will come in a standard variant, as well as a high-core-density variant named Zen 6c ("Monarch"). Each CCD will hold up to 32 cores. This will be used for server chips, and is speculated to also be for mobile platforms.

== Zen 6 LP ==
A new variant is set to debut, named Zen 6 LP. This variant is similar in function to Intel's LP-E cores in processors such as Meteor Lake and Panther Lake, handling background tasks along with maintaining hybrid sleep. However, unlike Intel's Darkmont, Zen 6 LP will be a more condensed and underclocked form of Zen 6c, and as such will retain the same IPC, instruction sets, and extensions as Zen 6 and Zen 6c. The Zen 6 LP variant will be present in mobile chips and system on a chip (SoCs), handheld Accelerated Processing Units (APUs), the upcoming PlayStation 6 console's SoC, upcoming PlayStation 6 handheld's SoC and upcoming Xbox console's SoC.

== Products ==
=== Server ===
==== Venice ====
The Epyc 9006 series of high-performance server processors using Zen 6, codenamed Venice, were also announced at AMD Accelerating AI event on July 23, 2026. Venice and Venice X both use SP7 or SP8 sockets depending on the model of processor, and packs up to 96 cores and 192 threads on the top-end model. Venice is built on a TSMC 3 nm process.

Common features of EPYC 9006 server processers:

- Socket: SP7 and SP8.
- All the CPUs support DDR5-8000 in 16 channel mode.
- Fabrication process: TSMC N3E.

Branding and Model		Cores (threads)	Clock rate (GHz)		L3 cache (total)	TDP	Chiplets	Core config (Note: Core Complexes (CCX) × cores per CCX)	Socket	Release date	Launch price (Note: Manufacturer suggested retail price at launch)
Branding and Model		Cores (threads)	Base	Boost	L3 cache (total)	TDP	Chiplets	Core config	Socket	Release date	Launch price
Epyc	9G76	96 (192)	3.4	4.8	384 MB	500 W	8 × CCD; 2 × I/OD	8 × 12	SP7	TBA	TBA
Epyc	9686F	96 (192)	3.4	5.0	384 MB	500 W	8 × CCD; 2 × I/OD	8 × 12	SP7	TBA	TBA
Epyc	9556	64 (128)	2.75	4.3	384 MB	300 W	8 × CCD; 2 × I/OD	8 × 8	SP7	TBA	TBA
Epyc	9586F	64 (128)	3.75	5.0	384 MB	500 W	8 × CCD; 2 × I/OD	8 × 8	SP7	TBA	TBA
Epyc	9576F	64 (128)	3.55	5.0	384 MB	400 W	8 × CCD; 2 × I/OD	8 × 8	SP8	TBA	TBA
Epyc	9476F	48 (96)	3.65	5.0	192 MB	330 W	4 × CCD; 2 × I/OD	4 × 12	SP8	TBA	TBA
Epyc	9016	8 (16)	3.05	4.8	48 MB	130 W	1 × CCD; 1 × I/OD	1 × 8	SP8	TBA	TBA

==== Venice Dense ====
A variant of Epyc 9006 using Zen 6c was also announced at AMD Accelerating AI event. It features a maximum of 256 cores and 512 threads, 128 MB of L3 cache, and is manufactured on a 2 nm process.

Common features of EPYC Dense 9006 server processors:

- Socket: SP7 and SP8.
- All the CPUs support DDR5-8000 in 16 channel mode.
- Fabrication process: TSMC N2P.

EPYC 9006 (Venice) processors with Zen 6c cores
Branding and model		Cores (threads)	Clock rate (GHz)		L3 cache (total)	Default CPU power	Chiplets (Note: CCD means Core Complex Die and IOD means Input/Output Die.)	Core configuration (Note: Core complexes (CCX) × active cores per CCX, assuming an even distribution across the CCDs.)	Socket	Release date	Launch price (Note: AMD's published 1,000-unit price in US dollars.)
Branding and model		Cores (threads)	Base	Boost	L3 cache (total)	Default CPU power	Chiplets	Core configuration	Socket	Release date	Launch price
EPYC	9996	256 (512)	2.55	4.1	1024 MB	600 W	8 × CCD; 2 × IOD	8 × 32	SP7	Nov 10, 2026	US$14,904
EPYC	9956	256 (512)	1.70	4.1	1024 MB	400 W	8 × CCD; 2 × IOD	8 × 32	SP7	Nov 10, 2026	US$14,904
EPYC	9966	192 (384)	2.90	4.0	768 MB	600 W	6 × CCD; 2 × IOD	6 × 32	SP7	Nov 10, 2026	US$14,079
EPYC	9846	168 (336)	2.85	3.7	768 MB	500 W	6 × CCD; 2 × IOD	6 × 28	SP7	Nov 10, 2026	US$13,114
EPYC	9756	128 (256)	3.15	4.0	512 MB	500 W	4 × CCD; 2 × IOD	4 × 32	SP7	Nov 10, 2026	US$12,498
EPYC	9656	96 (192)	3.05	3.7	512 MB	400 W	4 × CCD; 2 × IOD	4 × 24	SP7	Nov 10, 2026	US$9,713
EPYC	9746	128 (256)	2.90	4.0	512 MB	400 W	4 × CCD; 2 × IOD	4 × 32	SP8	H1 2027 (planned)	US$11,679
EPYC	9736	128 (256)	2.70	3.7	512 MB	360 W	4 × CCD; 2 × IOD	4 × 32	SP8	H1 2027 (planned)	US$10,639
EPYC	9736P	128 (256)	2.70	3.7	512 MB	360 W	4 × CCD; 2 × IOD	4 × 32	SP8	H1 2027 (planned)	US$9,989
EPYC	9646	96 (192)	2.80	3.7	512 MB	300 W	4 × CCD; 2 × IOD	4 × 24	SP8	H1 2027 (planned)	US$8,904
EPYC	9646P	96 (192)	2.80	3.7	512 MB	300 W	4 × CCD; 2 × IOD	4 × 24	SP8	H1 2027 (planned)	US$8,001
EPYC	9536	64 (128)	3.25	4.0	256 MB	300 W	2 × CCD; 2 × IOD	2 × 32	SP8	H1 2027 (planned)	US$7,837
EPYC	9536P	64 (128)	3.25	4.1	256 MB	300 W	2 × CCD; 2 × IOD	2 × 32	SP8	H1 2027 (planned)	US$6,595
EPYC	9526	64 (128)	2.75	3.7	256 MB	220 W	2 × CCD; 2 × IOD	2 × 32	SP8	H1 2027 (planned)	US$7,123
EPYC	9456	48 (96)	3.20	3.7	256 MB	265 W	2 × CCD; 2 × IOD	2 × 24	SP8	H1 2027 (planned)	US$5,252
EPYC	9456P	48 (96)	3.20	3.7	256 MB	265 W	2 × CCD; 2 × IOD	2 × 24	SP8	H1 2027 (planned)	US$4,628
EPYC	9336	32 (64)	3.15	3.7	128 MB	195 W	2 × CCD; 2 × IOD	1 × 32	SP8	H1 2027 (planned)	US$3,320

== See also ==
- Nova Lake – a competing consumer CPU lineup from Intel

Turion / ULV		Node range label	x86			
Microarchi.	Step	Node range label	Microarchi.	Step		
		180 nm	K7	Athlon Classic		
		180 nm	K7	Thunderbird		
		180 nm	K7	Palomino		
		130 nm	K7	Thoroughbred		
		130 nm	K7	Barton/Thorton		
		130 nm	K8	ClawHammer		
		130 nm	K8	Newcastle		
		130 nm	K8	SledgeHammer		
K8L	Lancaster	90 nm	K8	Winchester	K8(×2)	K9
K8L	Richmond	90 nm	K8	San Diego	Toledo	~~Greyhound~~
K8L	Taylor / Trinidad	90 nm	K8	San Diego	Windsor	
K8L	Tyler	65 nm	K8	Orleans	Brisbane	
K8L	Lion	65 nm	K10	Phenom	4 cores on mainstream desktop, DDR3 introduced	
K8L	Caspian	45 nm	K10	Phenom II / Athlon II	6 cores on mainstream desktop	
14h	Bobcat	40 nm				
		32 nm	K10	Lynx		
		32 nm	K10	Llano	APU introduced; CPU and GPU on single die	
		32 nm	Bulldozer 15h	Bulldozer	8 cores on mainstream desktop	
		32 nm	Bulldozer 15h	Piledriver		
16h	Jaguar	28 nm	Bulldozer 15h	Steamroller	APU/mobile-only	
16h	Puma	28 nm	Bulldozer 15h	Excavator	APU/mobile-only, DDR4 introduced	
K12	~~K12 (ARM64)~~	14 nm	Zen	Zen	SMT introduced	
		12 nm	Zen	Zen+		
		7 nm	Zen	Zen 2	12 and 16 cores on mainstream desktop, chiplet design	
		7 nm	Zen	Zen 3	3D V-Cache variants introduced	
		6 nm	Zen	Zen 3+	Mobile-only, DDR5 introduced	
		5 nm / 4 nm	Zen	Zen 4	High core density "Cloud" (Zen xc) variants introduced	
		4 nm / 3 nm	Zen	Zen 5	Ryzen AI NPU cores introduced	
		3 nm / 2 nm	Zen	Zen 6		
		16A / 14A	Zen	Zen 7		
