= AVX-512 =

Instruction set extension by Intel

AVX-512 are 512-bit extensions to the 256-bit Advanced Vector Extensions SIMD instructions for x86 instruction set architecture (ISA) proposed by Intel in July 2013, and first implemented in the 2016 Intel Xeon Phi x200 (Knights Landing), and then later in a number of AMD and other Intel CPUs (see list below). AVX-512 consists of multiple extensions that may be implemented independently. This policy is a departure from the historical requirement of implementing the entire instruction block. Only the core extension AVX-512F (AVX-512 Foundation) is required by all AVX-512 implementations.

Besides widening most 256-bit instructions, the extensions introduce various new operations, such as new data conversions, scatter operations, and permutations. The number of AVX registers is increased from 16 to 32, and eight new "mask registers" are added, which allow for variable selection and blending of the results of instructions. In CPUs with the vector length (VL) extension—included in most AVX-512-capable processors (see § CPUs with AVX-512)—these instructions may also be used on the 128-bit and 256-bit vector sizes.

AVX-512 is not the first 512-bit SIMD instruction set that Intel has introduced in processors: the earlier 512-bit SIMD instructions used in the first generation Xeon Phi coprocessors, derived from Intel's Larrabee project, are similar but not binary compatible and only partially source compatible.

The successor to AVX-512 is AVX10, announced in July 2023. AVX10 simplifies detection of supported instructions by introducing a version of the instruction set, where each subsequent version includes all instructions from the previous one. In the initial revisions of the AVX10 specification, the support for 512-bit vectors was made optional, which would allow Intel to support it in their E-cores. In later revisions, Intel made 512-bit vectors mandatory, with the intention to support 512-bit vectors both in P- and E-cores. The initial version 1 of AVX10 does not add new instructions compared to AVX-512, and for processors supporting 512-bit vectors it is equivalent to AVX-512 (in the set supported by Intel Sapphire Rapids processors). Later AVX10 versions will introduce new features.

== Instruction set ==
The AVX-512 instruction set consists of several separate sets each having their own unique CPUID feature bit. However, they are typically grouped by the processor generation that implements them.

F, CD, ER, PF: introduced with Xeon Phi x200 (Knights Landing) and Xeon Scalable (Skylake SP "Purley"), with the last two (ER and PF) being specific to Knights Landing & Knights Mill.

- AVX-512 Foundation (F) – expands most 32-bit and 64-bit based AVX instructions with the EVEX coding scheme to support 512-bit registers, operation masks, parameter broadcasting, and embedded rounding and exception control, implemented by Knights Landing and Skylake Xeon
- AVX-512 Conflict Detection Instructions (CD) – efficient conflict detection to allow more loops to be vectorized, implemented by Knights Landing and Skylake X
- AVX-512 Exponential and Reciprocal Instructions (ER) – exponential and reciprocal operations designed to help implement transcendental operations, implemented by Knights Landing
- AVX-512 Prefetch Instructions (PF) – new prefetch capabilities, implemented by Knights Landing

4VNNIW, 4FMAPS: introduced with and specific to Knights Mill.

- AVX-512 Vector Neural Network Instructions Word variable precision (4VNNIW) – vector instructions for deep learning, enhanced word, variable precision.
- AVX-512 Fused Multiply Accumulation Packed Single precision (4FMAPS) – vector instructions for deep learning, floating point, single precision.

VL, DQ, BW: introduced with Skylake-X/SP and Cannon Lake.

- AVX-512 Vector Length Extensions (VL) – extends most AVX-512 operations to also operate on XMM (128-bit) and YMM (256-bit) registers
- AVX-512 Doubleword and Quadword Instructions (DQ) – adds new 32-bit and 64-bit AVX-512 instructions
- AVX-512 Byte and Word Instructions (BW) – extends AVX-512 to cover 8-bit and 16-bit integer operations

IFMA, VBMI: introduced with Cannon Lake.

- AVX-512 Integer Fused Multiply Add (IFMA) – fused multiply add of integers using 52-bit precision.
- AVX-512 Vector Bit Manipulation Instructions (VBMI) adds vector byte permutation instructions which were not present in AVX-512BW.

VNNI: introduced with Cascade Lake.

- AVX-512 Vector Neural Network Instructions (VNNI) – vector instructions for deep learning.

VPOPCNTDQ: Vector population count instruction. Introduced with Knights Mill and Ice Lake.

VBMI2, BITALG: introduced with Ice Lake.

- AVX-512 Vector Bit Manipulation Instructions 2 (VBMI2) – byte/word load, store and concatenation with shift.
- AVX-512 Bit Algorithms (BITALG) – byte/word bit manipulation instructions expanding VPOPCNTDQ.

VP2INTERSECT: introduced with Tiger Lake.

- AVX-512 Vector Pair Intersection to a Pair of Mask Registers (VP2INTERSECT).

GFNI, VPCLMULQDQ, VAES: introduced with Ice Lake.

- These are not AVX-512 features per se. Together with AVX-512, they enable EVEX encoded versions of GFNI, PCLMULQDQ and AES instructions.

BMM: introduced with AMD Zen 6.

- AVX-512 Bit Manipulation Instructions (BMM) – includes Bit Matrix Multiply and Bit Reversal operations.

== Encoding and features ==
The VEX prefix used by AVX and AVX2, while flexible, did not leave enough room for the features Intel wanted to add to AVX-512. This has led them to define a new prefix called EVEX.

Compared to VEX, EVEX adds the following benefits:

- Expanded register encoding allowing 32 512-bit registers.
- Adds 8 new opmask registers for masking most AVX-512 instructions.
- Adds a new scalar memory mode that automatically performs a broadcast.
- Adds room for explicit rounding control in each instruction.
- Adds a new compressed displacement memory addressing mode.

The extended registers, SIMD width bit, and opmask registers of AVX-512 are mandatory and all require support from the OS.

=== SIMD modes ===
The AVX-512 instructions are designed to mix with 128/256-bit AVX/AVX2 instructions without a performance penalty. However, AVX-512VL extensions allows the use of AVX-512 instructions on 128/256-bit registers XMM/YMM, so most SSE and AVX/AVX2 instructions have new AVX-512 versions encoded with the EVEX prefix which allow access to new features such as opmask and additional registers. Unlike AVX-256, the new instructions do not have new mnemonics but share namespace with AVX, making the distinction between VEX and EVEX encoded versions of an instruction ambiguous in the source code. Since AVX-512F only works on 32- and 64-bit values, SSE and AVX/AVX2 instructions that operate on bytes or words are available only with the AVX-512BW extension (byte & word support).

Name	Extension sets	Registers	Types
Legacy SSE	SSE–SSE4.2	xmm0–xmm15	single floats from SSE2: bytes, words, doublewords, quadwords and double floats
AVX-128 (VEX)	AVX, AVX2	xmm0–xmm15	bytes, words, doublewords, quadwords, single floats and double floats
AVX-256 (VEX)	AVX, AVX2	ymm0–ymm15	single float and double float from AVX2: bytes, words, doublewords, quadwords
AVX-128 (EVEX)	AVX-512VL	xmm0–xmm31 (k0–k7)	doublewords, quadwords, single float and double float with AVX512BW: bytes and words. with AVX512-FP16: half float
AVX-256 (EVEX) AVX10/256	AVX-512VL	ymm0–ymm31 (k0–k7)	doublewords, quadwords, single float and double float with AVX512BW: bytes and words. with AVX512-FP16: half float
AVX-512 (EVEX) AVX10/512	AVX-512F	zmm0–zmm31 (k0–k7)	doublewords, quadwords, single float and double float with AVX512BW: bytes and words with AVX512-FP16: half float

=== Extended registers ===
x64 AVX-512 register scheme as extension from the x64 AVX (YMM0–YMM15) and x64 SSE (XMM0–XMM15) registers
511 256	255 128	127 0
ZMM0	YMM0	XMM0
ZMM1	YMM1	XMM1
ZMM2	YMM2	XMM2
ZMM3	YMM3	XMM3
ZMM4	YMM4	XMM4
ZMM5	YMM5	XMM5
ZMM6	YMM6	XMM6
ZMM7	YMM7	XMM7
ZMM8	YMM8	XMM8
ZMM9	YMM9	XMM9
ZMM10	YMM10	XMM10
ZMM11	YMM11	XMM11
ZMM12	YMM12	XMM12
ZMM13	YMM13	XMM13
ZMM14	YMM14	XMM14
ZMM15	YMM15	XMM15
ZMM16	YMM16	XMM16
ZMM17	YMM17	XMM17
ZMM18	YMM18	XMM18
ZMM19	YMM19	XMM19
ZMM20	YMM20	XMM20
ZMM21	YMM21	XMM21
ZMM22	YMM22	XMM22
ZMM23	YMM23	XMM23
ZMM24	YMM24	XMM24
ZMM25	YMM25	XMM25
ZMM26	YMM26	XMM26
ZMM27	YMM27	XMM27
ZMM28	YMM28	XMM28
ZMM29	YMM29	XMM29
ZMM30	YMM30	XMM30
ZMM31	YMM31	XMM31

The width of the SIMD register file is increased from 256 bits to 512 bits, and expanded from 16 to a total of 32 registers ZMM0–ZMM31. These registers can be addressed as 256 bit YMM registers from AVX extensions and 128-bit XMM registers from Streaming SIMD Extensions, and legacy AVX and SSE instructions can be extended to operate on the 16 additional registers XMM16-XMM31 and YMM16-YMM31 when using EVEX encoded form.

== Opmask registers ==
AVX-512 vector instructions may indicate an opmask register to control which values are written to the destination. The instruction encoding supports 0–7 for this field; however, only opmask registers k1–k7 (of k0–k7) can be used as the mask corresponding to the value 1–7, whereas the value 0 is reserved for indicating no opmask register is used; that is, a hardcoded constant (instead of 'k0') is used to indicate unmasked operations. The special opmask register 'k0' is still a functioning, valid register, it can be used in opmask register manipulation instructions or used as the destination opmask register. A flag controls the opmask behavior, which can either be "zero", which zeros everything not selected by the mask, or "merge", which leaves everything not selected untouched. The merge behavior is identical to the blend instructions.

The opmask registers are normally 16 bits wide, but can be up to 64 bits with the AVX-512BW extension. How many of the bits are actually used, though, depends on the vector type of the instructions masked. For the 32-bit single float or double words, 16 bits are used to mask the 16 elements in a 512-bit register. For double float and quad words, at most 8 mask bits are used.

The opmask register is the reason why several bitwise instructions which naturally have no element widths had them added in AVX-512. For instance, bitwise AND, OR or 128-bit shuffle now exist in both double-word and quad-word variants with the only difference being in the final masking.

=== New opmask instructions ===
The opmask registers have a new mini extension of instructions operating directly on them. Unlike the rest of the AVX-512 instructions, these instructions are all VEX encoded. The initial opmask instructions are all 16-bit (Word) versions. With AVX-512DQ 8-bit (Byte) versions were added to better match the needs of masking 8 64-bit values, and with AVX-512BW 32-bit (Double) and 64-bit (Quad) versions were added so they can mask up to 64 8-bit values. The instructions KORTEST and KTEST can be used to set the x86 flags based on mask registers, so that they may be used together with non-SIMD x86 branch and conditional instructions.

Instruction	Extension set	Description
KAND	F	Bitwise logical AND Masks
KANDN	F	Bitwise logical AND NOT Masks
KMOV	F	Move from and to Mask Registers or General Purpose Registers
KUNPCK	F	Unpack for Mask Registers
KNOT	F	NOT Mask Register
KOR	F	Bitwise logical OR Masks
KORTEST	F	OR Masks And Set Flags
KSHIFTL	F	Shift Left Mask Registers
KSHIFTR	F	Shift Right Mask Registers
KXNOR	F	Bitwise logical XNOR Masks
KXOR	F	Bitwise logical XOR Masks
KADD	BW/DQ	Add Two Masks
KTEST	BW/DQ	Bitwise comparison and set flags

== New instructions in AVX-512 foundation ==
Many AVX-512 instructions are simply EVEX versions of old SSE or AVX instructions. There are, however, several new instructions, and old instructions that have been replaced with new AVX-512 versions. The new or heavily reworked instructions are listed below. These foundation instructions also include the extensions from AVX-512VL and AVX-512BW since those extensions merely add new versions of these instructions instead of new instructions.

=== Blend using mask ===
There are no EVEX-prefixed versions of the blend instructions from SSE4; instead, AVX-512 has a new set of blending instructions using mask registers as selectors. Together with the general compare into mask instructions below, these may be used to implement generic ternary operations or cmov, similar to XOP's VPCMOV.

Since blending is an integral part of the EVEX encoding, these instructions may also be considered basic move instructions. Using the zeroing blend mode, they can also be used as masking instructions.

Instruction	Extension set	Description
VBLENDMPD	F	Blend float64 vectors using opmask control
VBLENDMPS	F	Blend float32 vectors using opmask control
VPBLENDMD	F	Blend int32 vectors using opmask control
VPBLENDMQ	F	Blend int64 vectors using opmask control
VPBLENDMB	BW	Blend byte integer vectors using opmask control
VPBLENDMW	BW	Blend word integer vectors using opmask control

=== Compare into mask ===
AVX-512F has four new compare instructions. Like their XOP counterparts they use the immediate field to select between 8 different comparisons. Unlike their XOP inspiration, however, they save the result to a mask register and initially only support doubleword and quadword comparisons. The AVX-512BW extension provides the byte and word versions. Note that two mask registers may be specified for the instructions, one to write to and one to declare regular masking.

Imme- diate	Compa- rison	Description
0	EQ	Equal
1	LT	Less than
2	LE	Less than or equal
3	FALSE	Set to zero
4	NEQ	Not equal
5	NLT	Greater than or equal
6	NLE	Greater than
7	TRUE	Set to one

Instruction	Extension set	Description
VPCMPD, VPCMPUD	F	Compare signed/unsigned doublewords into mask
VPCMPQ, VPCMPUQ	F	Compare signed/unsigned quadwords into mask
VPCMPB, VPCMPUB	BW	Compare signed/unsigned bytes into mask
VPCMPW, VPCMPUW	BW	Compare signed/unsigned words into mask

=== Logical set mask ===
The final way to set masks is using Logical Set Mask. These instructions perform either AND or NAND, and then set the destination opmask based on the result values being zero or non-zero. Note that like the comparison instructions, these take two opmask registers, one as destination and one a regular opmask.

Instruction	Extension set	Description
VPTESTMD, VPTESTMQ	F	Logical AND and set mask for 32 or 64 bit integers.
VPTESTNMD, VPTESTNMQ	F	Logical NAND and set mask for 32 or 64 bit integers.
VPTESTMB, VPTESTMW	BW	Logical AND and set mask for 8 or 16 bit integers.
VPTESTNMB, VPTESTNMW	BW	Logical NAND and set mask for 8 or 16 bit integers.

=== Compress and expand ===
The compress and expand instructions match the APL operations of the same name. They use the opmask in a slightly different way from other AVX-512 instructions. Compress only saves the values marked in the mask, but saves them compacted by skipping and not reserving space for unmarked values. Expand operates in the opposite way, by loading as many values as indicated in the mask and then spreading them to the selected positions.

Instruction	Description
VCOMPRESSPD, VCOMPRESSPS	Store sparse packed double/single-precision floating-point values into dense memory
VPCOMPRESSD, VPCOMPRESSQ	Store sparse packed doubleword/quadword integer values into dense memory/register
VEXPANDPD, VEXPANDPS	Load sparse packed double/single-precision floating-point values from dense memory
VPEXPANDD, VPEXPANDQ	Load sparse packed doubleword/quadword integer values from dense memory/register

=== Permute ===
A new set of permute instructions have been added for full two input permutations. They all take three arguments, two source registers and one index; the result is output by either overwriting the first source register or the index register. AVX-512BW extends the instructions to also include 16-bit (word) versions, and the AVX-512_VBMI extension defines the byte versions of the instructions.

Instruction	Extension set	Description
VPERMB	VBMI	Permute packed bytes elements.
VPERMW	BW	Permute packed words elements.
VPERMT2B	VBMI	Full byte permute overwriting first source.
VPERMT2W	BW	Full word permute overwriting first source.
VPERMI2PD, VPERMI2PS	F	Full single/double floating-point permute overwriting the index.
VPERMI2D, VPERMI2Q	F	Full doubleword/quadword permute overwriting the index.
VPERMI2B	VBMI	Full byte permute overwriting the index.
VPERMI2W	BW	Full word permute overwriting the index.
VPERMT2PS, VPERMT2PD	F	Full single/double floating-point permute overwriting first source.
VPERMT2D, VPERMT2Q	F	Full doubleword/quadword permute overwriting first source.
VSHUFF32x4, VSHUFF64x2, VSHUFI32x4, VSHUFI64x2	F	Shuffle four packed 128-bit lines.
VPMULTISHIFTQB	VBMI	Select packed unaligned bytes from quadword sources.

=== Bitwise ternary logic ===
Two new instructions added can logically implement all possible bitwise operations between three inputs. They take three registers as input and an 8-bit immediate field. Each bit in the output is generated using a lookup of the three corresponding bits in the inputs to select one of the 8 positions in the 8-bit immediate. Since only 8 combinations are possible using three bits, this allow all possible 3 input bitwise operations to be performed. These are the only bitwise vector instructions in AVX-512F; EVEX versions of the two source SSE and AVX bitwise vector instructions AND, ANDN, OR and XOR were added in AVX-512DQ.

The difference in the doubleword and quadword versions is only the application of the opmask.

Instruction	Description
VPTERNLOGD, VPTERNLOGQ	Bitwise Ternary Logic

=== Conversions ===
A number of conversion or move instructions were added; these complete the set of conversion instructions available from SSE2.

Instruction	Extension set	Description
VPMOVQD, VPMOVSQD, VPMOVUSQD, VPMOVQW, VPMOVSQW, VPMOVUSQW, VPMOVQB, VPMOVSQB, VPMOVUSQB, VPMOVDW, VPMOVSDW, VPMOVUSDW, VPMOVDB, VPMOVSDB, VPMOVUSDB	F	Down convert quadword or doubleword to doubleword, word or byte; unsaturated, saturated or saturated unsigned. The reverse of the sign/zero extend instructions from SSE4.1.
VPMOVWB, VPMOVSWB, VPMOVUSWB	BW	Down convert word to byte; unsaturated, saturated or saturated unsigned.
VCVTPS2UDQ, VCVTPD2UDQ, VCVTTPS2UDQ, VCVTTPD2UDQ	F	Convert with or without truncation, packed single or double-precision floating point to packed unsigned doubleword integers.
VCVTSS2USI, VCVTSD2USI, VCVTTSS2USI, VCVTTSD2USI	F	Convert with or without truncation, scalar single or double-precision floating point to unsigned doubleword integer.
VCVTPS2QQ, VCVTPD2QQ, VCVTPS2UQQ, VCVTPD2UQQ, VCVTTPS2QQ, VCVTTPD2QQ, VCVTTPS2UQQ, VCVTTPD2UQQ	DQ	Convert with or without truncation, packed single or double-precision floating point to packed signed or unsigned quadword integers.
VCVTUDQ2PS, VCVTUDQ2PD	F	Convert packed unsigned doubleword integers to packed single or double-precision floating point.
VCVTUSI2PS, VCVTUSI2PD	F	Convert scalar unsigned doubleword integers to single or double-precision floating point.
VCVTUSI2SD, VCVTUSI2SS	F	Convert scalar unsigned integers to single or double-precision floating point.
VCVTUQQ2PS, VCVTUQQ2PD	DQ	Convert packed unsigned quadword integers to packed single or double-precision floating point.
VCVTQQ2PD, VCVTQQ2PS	F	Convert packed quadword integers to packed single or double-precision floating point.

=== Floating-point decomposition ===
Among the unique new features in AVX-512F are instructions to decompose floating-point values and handle special floating-point values. Since these methods are completely new, they also exist in scalar versions.

Instruction	Description
VGETEXPPD, VGETEXPPS	Convert exponents of packed fp values into fp values
VGETEXPSD, VGETEXPSS	Convert exponent of scalar fp value into fp value
VGETMANTPD, VGETMANTPS	Extract vector of normalized mantissas from float32/float64 vector
VGETMANTSD, VGETMANTSS	Extract float32/float64 of normalized mantissa from float32/float64 scalar
VFIXUPIMMPD, VFIXUPIMMPS	Fix up special packed float32/float64 values
VFIXUPIMMSD, VFIXUPIMMSS	Fix up special scalar float32/float64 value

=== Floating-point arithmetic ===
This is the second set of new floating-point methods, which includes new scaling and approximate calculation of reciprocal, and reciprocal of square root. The approximate reciprocal instructions guarantee to have at most a relative error of 2^{−14}.

Instruction	Description
VRCP14PD, VRCP14PS	Compute approximate reciprocals of packed float32/float64 values
VRCP14SD, VRCP14SS	Compute approximate reciprocals of scalar float32/float64 value
VRNDSCALEPS, VRNDSCALEPD	Round packed float32/float64 values to include a given number of fraction bits
VRNDSCALESS, VRNDSCALESD	Round scalar float32/float64 value to include a given number of fraction bits
VRSQRT14PD, VRSQRT14PS	Compute approximate reciprocals of square roots of packed float32/float64 values
VRSQRT14SD, VRSQRT14SS	Compute approximate reciprocal of square root of scalar float32/float64 value
VSCALEFPS, VSCALEFPD	Scale packed float32/float64 values with float32/float64 values
VSCALEFSS, VSCALEFSD	Scale scalar float32/float64 value with float32/float64 value

=== Broadcast ===
Instruction	Extension set	Description
VBROADCASTSS, VBROADCASTSD	F, VL	Broadcast single/double floating-point value
VPBROADCASTB, VPBROADCASTW, VPBROADCASTD, VPBROADCASTQ	F, VL, DQ, BW	Broadcast a byte/word/doubleword/quadword integer value
VBROADCASTI32X2, VBROADCASTI64X2, VBROADCASTI32X4, VBROADCASTI32X8, VBROADCASTI64X4	F, VL, DQ, BW	Broadcast two or four doubleword/quadword integer values

=== Miscellaneous ===
Instruction	Extension set	Description
VALIGND, VALIGNQ	F, VL	Align doubleword or quadword vectors
VDBPSADBW	BW	Double block packed sum-absolute-differences (SAD) on unsigned bytes
VPABSQ	F	Packed absolute value quadword
VPMAXSQ, VPMAXUQ	F	Maximum of packed signed/unsigned quadword
VPMINSQ, VPMINUQ	F	Minimum of packed signed/unsigned quadword
VPROLD, VPROLVD, VPROLQ, VPROLVQ, VPRORD, VPRORVD, VPRORQ, VPRORVQ	F	Bit rotate left or right
VPSCATTERDD, VPSCATTERDQ, VPSCATTERQD, VPSCATTERQQ	F	Scatter packed doubleword/quadword with signed doubleword and quadword indices
VSCATTERDPS, VSCATTERDPD, VSCATTERQPS, VSCATTERQPD	F	Scatter packed float32/float64 with signed doubleword and quadword indices

== New instructions by sets ==
=== Conflict detection ===
The instructions in AVX-512 conflict detection (AVX-512CD) are designed to help efficiently calculate conflict-free subsets of elements in loops that normally could not be safely vectorized.

Instruction	Name	Description
VPCONFLICTD, VPCONFLICTQ	Detect conflicts within vector of packed double- or quadwords values	Compares each element in the first source, to all elements on same or earlier places in the second source and forms a bit vector of the results
VPLZCNTD, VPLZCNTQ	Count the number of leading zero bits for packed double- or quadword values	Vectorized LZCNT instruction
VPBROADCASTMB2Q, VPBROADCASTMW2D	Broadcast mask to vector register	Either 8-bit mask to quadword vector, or 16-bit mask to doubleword vector

=== Exponential and reciprocal ===
AVX-512 exponential and reciprocal (AVX-512ER) instructions contain more accurate approximate reciprocal instructions than those in the AVX-512 foundation; relative error is at most 2^{−28}. They also contain two new exponential functions that have a relative error of at most 2^{−23}.

Instruction	Description
VEXP2PD, VEXP2PS	Compute approximate exponential 2^{x} of packed single or double-precision floating-point values
VRCP28PD, VRCP28PS	Compute approximate reciprocals of packed single or double-precision floating-point values
VRCP28SD, VRCP28SS	Compute approximate reciprocal of scalar single or double-precision floating-point value
VRSQRT28PD, VRSQRT28PS	Compute approximate reciprocals of square roots of packed single or double-precision floating-point values
VRSQRT28SD, VRSQRT28SS	Compute approximate reciprocal of square root of scalar single or double-precision floating-point value

=== Prefetch ===
AVX-512 prefetch (AVX-512PF) instructions contain new prefetch operations for the new scatter and gather functionality introduced in AVX2 and AVX-512. T0 prefetch means prefetching into level 1 cache and T1 means prefetching into level 2 cache.

Instruction	Description
VGATHERPF0DPS, VGATHERPF0QPS, VGATHERPF0DPD, VGATHERPF0QPD	Using signed dword/qword indices, prefetch sparse byte memory locations containing single/double-precision data using opmask k1 and T0 hint.
VGATHERPF1DPS, VGATHERPF1QPS, VGATHERPF1DPD, VGATHERPF1QPD	Using signed dword/qword indices, prefetch sparse byte memory locations containing single/double-precision data using opmask k1 and T1 hint.
VSCATTERPF0DPS, VSCATTERPF0QPS, VSCATTERPF0DPD, VSCATTERPF0QPD	Using signed dword/qword indices, prefetch sparse byte memory locations containing single/double-precision data using writemask k1 and T0 hint with intent to write.
VSCATTERPF1DPS, VSCATTERPF1QPS, VSCATTERPF1DPD, VSCATTERPF1QPD	Using signed dword/qword indices, prefetch sparse byte memory locations containing single/double precision data using writemask k1 and T1 hint with intent to write.

=== 4FMAPS and 4VNNIW ===
The two sets of instructions perform multiple iterations of processing. They are generally only found in Xeon Phi products.

Instruction	Extension set	Description
V4FMADDPS, V4FMADDSS	4FMAPS	Packed/scalar single-precision floating-point fused multiply-add (4-iterations)
V4FNMADDPS, V4FNMADDSS	4FMAPS	Packed/scalar single-precision floating-point fused multiply-add and negate (4-iterations)
VP4DPWSSD	4VNNIW	Dot product of signed words with double word accumulation (4-iterations)
VP4DPWSSDS	4VNNIW	Dot product of signed words with double word accumulation and saturation (4-iterations)

=== BW, DQ and VBMI ===
AVX-512DQ adds new doubleword and quadword instructions. AVX-512BW adds byte and words versions of the same instructions, and adds byte and word version of doubleword/quadword instructions in AVX-512F. A few instructions which get only word forms with AVX-512BW acquire byte forms with the AVX-512_VBMI extension (VPERMB, VPERMI2B, VPERMT2B, VPMULTISHIFTQB).

Two new instructions were added to the mask instructions set: KADD and KTEST (B and W forms with AVX-512DQ, D and Q with AVX-512BW). The rest of mask instructions, which had only word forms, got byte forms with AVX-512DQ and doubleword/quadword forms with AVX-512BW. KUNPCKBW was extended to KUNPCKWD and KUNPCKDQ by AVX-512BW.

Among the instructions added by AVX-512DQ are several SSE and AVX instructions that didn't get AVX-512 versions with AVX-512F, among those are all the two input bitwise instructions and extract/insert integer instructions.

Instructions that are completely new are covered below.

==== Floating-point instructions ====
Three new floating-point operations are introduced. Since they are not only new to AVX-512 they have both packed/SIMD and scalar versions.

The VFPCLASS instructions tests if the floating-point value is one of eight special floating-point values, which of the eight values will trigger a bit in the output mask register is controlled by the immediate field. The VRANGE instructions perform minimum or maximum operations depending on the value of the immediate field, which can also control if the operation is done absolute or not and separately how the sign is handled. The VREDUCE instructions operate on a single source, and subtract from that the integer part of the source value plus a number of bits specified in the immediate field of its fraction.

Instruction	Extension set	Description
VFPCLASSPS, VFPCLASSPD	DQ	Test types of packed single and double precision floating-point values.
VFPCLASSSS, VFPCLASSSD	DQ	Test types of scalar single and double precision floating-point values.
VRANGEPS, VRANGEPD	DQ	Range restriction calculation for packed floating-point values.
VRANGESS, VRANGESD	DQ	Range restriction calculation for scalar floating-point values.
VREDUCEPS, VREDUCEPD	DQ	Perform reduction transformation on packed floating-point values.
VREDUCESS, VREDUCESD	DQ	Perform reduction transformation on scalar floating-point values.

==== Other instructions ====
Instruction	Extension set	Description
VPMOVM2D, VPMOVM2Q	DQ	Convert mask register to double- or quad-word vector register.
VPMOVM2B, VPMOVM2W	BW	Convert mask register to byte or word vector register.
VPMOVD2M, VPMOVQ2M	DQ	Convert double- or quad-word vector register to mask register.
VPMOVB2M, VPMOVW2M	BW	Convert byte or word vector register to mask register.
VPMULLQ	DQ	Multiply packed quadword store low result. A quadword version of VPMULLD.

=== VBMI2 ===
Extend VPCOMPRESS and VPEXPAND with byte and word variants. Shift instructions are new.

Instruction	Description
VPCOMPRESSB, VPCOMPRESSW	Store sparse packed byte/word integer values into dense memory/register
VPEXPANDB, VPEXPANDW	Load sparse packed byte/word integer values from dense memory/register
VPSHLD	Concatenate and shift packed data left logical
VPSHLDV	Concatenate and variable shift packed data left logical
VPSHRD	Concatenate and shift packed data right logical
VPSHRDV	Concatenate and variable shift packed data right logical

=== VNNI ===
Vector Neural Network Instructions: AVX512-VNNI adds EVEX-coded instructions described below. With AVX-512F, these instructions can operate on 512-bit vectors, and AVX-512VL further adds support for 128- and 256-bit vectors.

A later AVX-VNNI extension adds VEX encodings of these instructions which can only operate on 128- or 256-bit vectors. AVX-VNNI is not part of the AVX-512 suite, it does not require AVX-512F and can be implemented independently.

Instruction	Description
VPDPBUSD, VPDPBUSDS	Multiply groups of 4 pairs of signed bytes in the second input with corresponding unsigned bytes of the first input, summing those products and adding them to the doubleword result in the output. VPDPBUSDS performs signed saturation of the result.
VPDPWSSD, VPDPWSSDS	Multiply groups of 2 pairs of signed words in the second input with corresponding signed words of the first input, summing those products and adding them to the doubleword result in the output. VPDPWSSDS performs signed saturation of the result.

=== IFMA ===
Integer fused multiply-add instructions. AVX512-IFMA adds EVEX-coded instructions described below.

A separate AVX-IFMA instruction set extension defines VEX encoding of these instructions. This extension is not part of the AVX-512 suite and can be implemented independently.

Instruction	Extension set	Description
VPMADD52LUQ	IFMA	Packed multiply of unsigned 52-bit integers and add the low 52-bit products to 64-bit accumulators
VPMADD52HUQ	IFMA	Packed multiply of unsigned 52-bit integers and add the high 52-bit products to 64-bit accumulators

=== VPOPCNTDQ and BITALG ===
Instruction	Extension set	Description
VPOPCNTD, VPOPCNTQ	VPOPCNTDQ	Return the number of bits set to 1 in doubleword/quadword
VPOPCNTB, VPOPCNTW	BITALG	Return the number of bits set to 1 in byte/word
VPSHUFBITQMB	BITALG	Shuffle bits from quadword elements using byte indexes into mask

=== VP2INTERSECT ===
Instruction	Extension set	Description
VP2INTERSECTD, VP2INTERSECTQ	VP2INTERSECT	Compute intersection between doublewords/quadwords to a pair of mask registers

=== GFNI ===
GFNI is a standalone instruction set extension and can be enabled separately from AVX or AVX-512. Depending on whether AVX and AVX-512F support is indicated by the CPU, GFNI support enables legacy (SSE), VEX or EVEX-coded instructions operating on 128, 256 or 512-bit vectors.

In cryptography, these instructions can be used to implement Rijndael-style S-boxes, such as those used in Camellia and ARIA. These instructions can also be used for bit manipulation in networking and signal processing.

Instruction	Description
VGF2P8AFFINEINVQB	Galois field affine transformation inverse
VGF2P8AFFINEQB	Galois field affine transformation
VGF2P8MULB	Galois field multiply bytes

=== VPCLMULQDQ ===
VPCLMULQDQ with AVX-512F adds an EVEX-encoded 512-bit version of the PCLMULQDQ instruction. With AVX-512VL, it adds EVEX-encoded 256- and 128-bit versions. VPCLMULQDQ alone (that is, on non-AVX-512 CPUs) adds only VEX-encoded 256-bit version. (Availability of the VEX-encoded 128-bit version is indicated by different CPUID bits: PCLMULQDQ and AVX.) The wider than 128-bit variations of the instruction perform the same operation on each 128-bit portion of input registers, but they do not extend it to select quadwords from different 128-bit fields (the meaning of imm8 operand is the same: either low or high quadword of the 128-bit field is selected).

Instruction	Description
VPCLMULQDQ	Carry-less multiplication quadword

=== VAES ===
VEX- and EVEX-encoded AES instructions. The wider than 128-bit variations of the instruction perform the same operation on each 128-bit portion of input registers. The VEX versions can be used without AVX-512 support.

Instruction	Description
VAESDEC	Perform one round of an AES decryption flow
VAESDECLAST	Perform last round of an AES decryption flow
VAESENC	Perform one round of an AES encryption flow
VAESENCLAST	Perform last round of an AES encryption flow

=== BF16 ===
AI acceleration instructions operating on the Bfloat16 numbers.

Instruction	Description
VCVTNE2PS2BF16	Convert two vectors of packed single precision numbers into one vector of packed Bfloat16 numbers
VCVTNEPS2BF16	Convert one vector of packed single precision numbers to one vector of packed Bfloat16 numbers
VDPBF16PS	Calculate dot product of two Bfloat16 pairs and accumulate the result into one packed single precision number

=== FP16 ===
An extension of the earlier F16C instruction set, adding comprehensive support for the binary16 floating-point numbers (also known as FP16, float16 or half-precision floating-point numbers). The new instructions implement most operations that were previously available for single and double-precision floating-point numbers and also introduce new complex number instructions and conversion instructions. Scalar and packed operations are supported.

Unlike the single and double-precision format instructions, the half-precision operands are neither conditionally flushed to zero (FTZ) nor conditionally treated as zero (DAZ) based on MXCSR settings. Subnormal values are processed at full speed by hardware to facilitate using the full dynamic range of the FP16 numbers. Instructions that create FP32 and FP64 numbers still respect the MXCSR.FTZ bit.

==== Arithmetic instructions ====
Instruction	Description
VADDPH, VADDSH	Add packed/scalar FP16 numbers.
VSUBPH, VSUBSH	Subtract packed/scalar FP16 numbers.
VMULPH, VMULSH	Multiply packed/scalar FP16 numbers.
VDIVPH, VDIVSH	Divide packed/scalar FP16 numbers.
VSQRTPH, VSQRTSH	Compute square root of packed/scalar FP16 numbers.
VFMADD{132, 213, 231}PH, VFMADD{132, 213, 231}SH	Multiply-add packed/scalar FP16 numbers.
VFNMADD{132, 213, 231}PH, VFNMADD{132, 213, 231}SH	Negated multiply-add packed/scalar FP16 numbers.
VFMSUB{132, 213, 231}PH, VFMSUB{132, 213, 231}SH	Multiply-subtract packed/scalar FP16 numbers.
VFNMSUB{132, 213, 231}PH, VFNMSUB{132, 213, 231}SH	Negated multiply-subtract packed/scalar FP16 numbers.
VFMADDSUB{132, 213, 231}PH	Multiply-add (odd vector elements) or multiply-subtract (even vector elements) packed FP16 numbers.
VFMSUBADD{132, 213, 231}PH	Multiply-subtract (odd vector elements) or multiply-add (even vector elements) packed FP16 numbers.
VREDUCEPH, VREDUCESH	Perform reduction transformation of the packed/scalar FP16 numbers.
VRNDSCALEPH, VRNDSCALESH	Round packed/scalar FP16 numbers to a given number of fraction bits.
VSCALEFPH, VSCALEFSH	Scale packed/scalar FP16 numbers by multiplying it by a power of two.

==== Complex arithmetic instructions ====
Instruction	Description
VFMULCPH, VFMULCSH	Multiply packed/scalar complex FP16 numbers.
VFCMULCPH, VFCMULCSH	Multiply packed/scalar complex FP16 numbers. Complex conjugate form of the operation.
VFMADDCPH, VFMADDCSH	Multiply-add packed/scalar complex FP16 numbers.
VFCMADDCPH, VFCMADDCSH	Multiply-add packed/scalar complex FP16 numbers. Complex conjugate form of the operation.

==== Approximate reciprocal instructions ====
Instruction	Description
VRCPPH, VRCPSH	Compute approximate reciprocal of the packed/scalar FP16 numbers. The maximum relative error of the approximation is less than 2^{−11} + 2^{−14}.
VRSQRTPH, VRSQRTSH	Compute approximate reciprocal square root of the packed/scalar FP16 numbers. The maximum relative error of the approximation is less than 2^{−14}.

==== Comparison instructions ====
Instruction	Description
VCMPPH, VCMPSH	Compare the packed/scalar FP16 numbers and store the result in a mask register.
VCOMISH	Compare the scalar FP16 numbers and store the result in the flags register. Signals an exception if a source operand is QNaN or SNaN.
VUCOMISH	Compare the scalar FP16 numbers and store the result in the flags register. Signals an exception only if a source operand is SNaN.
VMAXPH, VMAXSH	Select the maximum of each vertical pair of the source packed/scalar FP16 numbers.
VMINPH, VMINSH	Select the minimum of each vertical pair of the source packed/scalar FP16 numbers.
VFPCLASSPH, VFPCLASSSH	Test packed/scalar FP16 numbers for special categories (NaN, infinity, negative zero, etc.) and store the result in a mask register.

==== Conversion instructions ====
Instruction	Description
VCVTW2PH	Convert packed signed 16-bit integers to FP16 numbers.
VCVTUW2PH	Convert packed unsigned 16-bit integers to FP16 numbers.
VCVTDQ2PH	Convert packed signed 32-bit integers to FP16 numbers.
VCVTUDQ2PH	Convert packed unsigned 32-bit integers to FP16 numbers.
VCVTQQ2PH	Convert packed signed 64-bit integers to FP16 numbers.
VCVTUQQ2PH	Convert packed unsigned 64-bit integers to FP16 numbers.
VCVTPS2PHX	Convert packed FP32 numbers to FP16 numbers. Unlike VCVTPS2PH from F16C, VCVTPS2PHX has a different encoding that also supports broadcasting.
VCVTPD2PH	Convert packed FP64 numbers to FP16 numbers.
VCVTSI2SH	Convert a scalar signed 32-bit or 64-bit integer to FP16 number.
VCVTUSI2SH	Convert a scalar unsigned 32-bit or 64-bit integer to FP16 number.
VCVTSS2SH	Convert a scalar FP32 number to FP16 number.
VCVTSD2SH	Convert a scalar FP64 number to FP16 number.
VCVTPH2W, VCVTTPH2W	Convert packed FP16 numbers to signed 16-bit integers. VCVTPH2W rounds the value according to the MXCSR register. VCVTTPH2W rounds toward zero.
VCVTPH2UW, VCVTTPH2UW	Convert packed FP16 numbers to unsigned 16-bit integers. VCVTPH2UW rounds the value according to the MXCSR register. VCVTTPH2UW rounds toward zero.
VCVTPH2DQ, VCVTTPH2DQ	Convert packed FP16 numbers to signed 32-bit integers. VCVTPH2DQ rounds the value according to the MXCSR register. VCVTTPH2DQ rounds toward zero.
VCVTPH2UDQ, VCVTTPH2UDQ	Convert packed FP16 numbers to unsigned 32-bit integers. VCVTPH2UDQ rounds the value according to the MXCSR register. VCVTTPH2UDQ rounds toward zero.
VCVTPH2QQ, VCVTTPH2QQ	Convert packed FP16 numbers to signed 64-bit integers. VCVTPH2QQ rounds the value according to the MXCSR register. VCVTTPH2QQ rounds toward zero.
VCVTPH2UQQ, VCVTTPH2UQQ	Convert packed FP16 numbers to unsigned 64-bit integers. VCVTPH2UQQ rounds the value according to the MXCSR register. VCVTTPH2UQQ rounds toward zero.
VCVTPH2PSX	Convert packed FP16 numbers to FP32 numbers. Unlike VCVTPH2PS from F16C, VCVTPH2PSX has a different encoding that also supports broadcasting.
VCVTPH2PD	Convert packed FP16 numbers to FP64 numbers.
VCVTSH2SI, VCVTTSH2SI	Convert a scalar FP16 number to signed 32-bit or 64-bit integer. VCVTSH2SI rounds the value according to the MXCSR register. VCVTTSH2SI rounds toward zero.
VCVTSH2USI, VCVTTSH2USI	Convert a scalar FP16 number to unsigned 32-bit or 64-bit integer. VCVTSH2USI rounds the value according to the MXCSR register. VCVTTSH2USI rounds toward zero.
VCVTSH2SS	Convert a scalar FP16 number to FP32 number.
VCVTSH2SD	Convert a scalar FP16 number to FP64 number.

==== Decomposition instructions ====
Instruction	Description
VGETEXPPH, VGETEXPSH	Extract exponent components of packed/scalar FP16 numbers as FP16 numbers.
VGETMANTPH, VGETMANTSH	Extract mantissa components of packed/scalar FP16 numbers as FP16 numbers.

==== Move instructions ====
Instruction	Description
VMOVSH	Move scalar FP16 number to/from memory or between vector registers.
VMOVW	Move scalar FP16 number to/from memory or general purpose register.

=== BMM ===
Bit matrix multiply and bit reversal instructions. Unlike other AVX-512 subsets, originally introduced by AMD.

Bit matrix multiply instructions are only defined for 256 and 512-bit vectors, where each of the 256-bit lanes represent a 16x16 bit matrix. For 512-bit versions, each vector contains two matrices, and the operation is performed on them in parallel.

Bit reversal instruction is defined for 128, 256 and 512-bit vectors.

Instruction	Description
VBMACOR16x16x16	16x16 non-transposed fused BMM-accumulate (BMAC) with OR reduction.
VBMACXOR16x16x16	16x16 non-transposed fused BMM-accumulate (BMAC) with XOR reduction.
VBITREV	Bit reversal within a byte boundary.

== Legacy instructions with EVEX-encoded versions ==
Group	Legacy encoding			Instructions	AVX-512 extensions			
Group	SSE SSE2 MMX	AVX SSE3 SSE4	AVX2 FMA	Instructions	F	VL	BW	DQ
VADD	Yes	Yes	No	VADDPD, VADDPS, VADDSD, VADDSS	Y	Y	N	N
VAND	Yes	Yes	No	VANDPD, VANDPS, VANDNPD, VANDNPS	N	Y	N	Y
VCMP	Yes	Yes	No	VCMPPD, VCMPPS, VCMPSD, VCMPSS	Y	N	N	N
VCOM	Yes	Yes	No	VCOMISD, VCOMISS	Y	N	N	N
VDIV	Yes	Yes	No	VDIVPD, VDIVPS, VDIVSD, VDIVSS	Y	Y	N	N
VCVT	Yes	Yes	No	VCVTDQ2PD, VCVTDQ2PS, VCVTPD2DQ, VCVTPD2PS, VCVTPH2PS, VCVTPS2PH, VCVTPS2DQ, VCVTPS2PD, VCVTSD2SI, VCVTSD2SS, VCVTSI2SD, VCVTSI2SS, VCVTSS2SD, VCVTSS2SI, VCVTTPD2DQ, VCVTTPS2DQ, VCVTTSD2SI, VCVTTSS2SI	Y	Y	N	N
VMAX	Yes	Yes	No	VMAXPD, VMAXPS, VMAXSD, VMAXSS	Y	Y	N	N
VMIN	Yes	Yes	No	VMINPD, VMINPS, VMINSD, VMINSS	Y	N	N	N
VMOV	Yes	Yes	No	VMOVAPD, VMOVAPS, VMOVD, VMOVQ, VMOVDDUP, VMOVHLPS, VMOVHPD, VMOVHPS, VMOVLHPS, VMOVLPD, VMOVLPS, VMOVNTDQA, VMOVNTDQ, VMOVNTPD, VMOVNTPS, VMOVSD, VMOVSHDUP, VMOVSLDUP, VMOVSS, VMOVUPD, VMOVUPS, VMOVDQA32, VMOVDQA64, VMOVDQU8, VMOVDQU16, VMOVDQU32, VMOVDQU64	Y	Y	Y	N
VMUL	Yes	Yes	No	VMULPD, VMULPS, VMULSD, VMULSS	Y	Y	N	N
VOR	Yes	Yes	No	VORPD, VORPS	Y	N	N	Y
VSQRT	Yes	Yes	No	VSQRTPD, VSQRTPS, VSQRTSD, VSQRTSS	Y	Y	N	N
VSUB	Yes	Yes	No	VSUBPD, VSUBPS, VSUBSD, VSUBSS	Y	Y	N	N
VUCOMI	Yes	Yes	No	VUCOMISD, VUCOMISS	Y	N	N	N
VUNPCK	Yes	Yes	No	VUNPCKHPD, VUNPCKHPS, VUNPCKLPD, VUNPCKLPS	Y	Y	N	N
VXOR	Yes	Yes	No	VXORPD, VXORPS	N	Y	N	Y
VEXTRACTPS	No	Yes	No	VEXTRACTPS	Y	N	N	N
VINSERTPS	No	Yes	No	VINSERTPS	Y	N	N	N
VPEXTR	No	Yes	No	VPEXTRB, VPEXTRW, VPEXTRD, VPEXTRQ	N	N	Y	Y
VPINSR	No	Yes	No	VPINSRB, VPINSRW, VPINSRD, VPINSRQ	N	N	Y	Y
VPACK	Yes	Yes	Yes	VPACKSSWB, VPACKSSDW, VPACKUSDW, VPACKUSWB	N	Y	Y	N
VPADD	Yes	Yes	Yes	VPADDB, VPADDW, VPADDD, VPADDQ, VPADDSB, VPADDSW, VPADDUSB, VPADDUSW	Y	Y	Y	N
VPAND	Yes	Yes	Yes	VPANDD, VPANDQ, VPANDND, VPANDNQ	Y	Y	N	N
VPAVG	Yes	Yes	Yes	VPAVGB, VPAVGW	N	Y	Y	N
VPCMP	Yes	Yes	Yes	VPCMPEQB, VPCMPEQW, VPCMPEQD, VPCMPEQQ, VPCMPGTB, VPCMPGTW, VPCMPGTD, VPCMPGTQ	Y	Y	Y	N
VPMAX	Yes	Yes	Yes	VPMAXSB, VPMAXSW, VPMAXSD, VPMAXSQ, VPMAXUB, VPMAXUW, VPMAXUD, VPMAXUQ	Y	Y	Y	N
VPMIN	Yes	Yes	Yes	VPMINSB, VPMINSW, VPMINSD, VPMINSQ, VPMINUB, VPMINUW, VPMINUD, VPMINUQ	Y	Y	Y	N
VPMOV	Yes	Yes	Yes	VPMOVSXBW, VPMOVSXBD, VPMOVSXBQ, VPMOVSXWD, VPMOVSXWQ, VPMOVSXDQ, VPMOVZXBW, VPMOVZXBD, VPMOVZXBQ, VPMOVZXWD, VPMOVZXWQ, VPMOVZXDQ	Y	Y	Y	N
VPMUL	Yes	Yes	Yes	VPMULDQ, VPMULUDQ, VPMULHRSW, VPMULHUW, VPMULHW, VPMULLD, VPMULLQ, VPMULLW	Y	Y	Y	N
VPOR	Yes	Yes	Yes	VPORD, VPORQ	Y	Y	N	N
VPSUB	Yes	Yes	Yes	VPSUBB, VPSUBW, VPSUBD, VPSUBQ, VPSUBSB, VPSUBSW, VPSUBUSB, VPSUBUSW	Y	Y	Y	N
VPUNPCK	Yes	Yes	Yes	VPUNPCKHBW, VPUNPCKHWD, VPUNPCKHDQ, VPUNPCKHQDQ, VPUNPCKLBW, VPUNPCKLWD, VPUNPCKLDQ, VPUNPCKLQDQ	Y	Y	Y	N
VPXOR	Yes	Yes	Yes	VPXORD, VPXORQ	Y	Y	N	N
VPSADBW	Yes	Yes	Yes	VPSADBW	N	Y	Y	N
VPSHUF	Yes	Yes	Yes	VPSHUFB, VPSHUFHW, VPSHUFLW, VPSHUFD, VPSLLDQ, VPSLLW, VPSLLD, VPSLLQ, VPSRAW, VPSRAD, VPSRAQ, VPSRLDQ, VPSRLW, VPSRLD, VPSRLQ, VPSLLVW, VPSLLVD, VPSLLVQ, VPSRLVW, VPSRLVD, VPSRLVQ, VPSHUFPD, VPSHUFPS	Y	Y	Y	N
VEXTRACT	No	Yes	Yes	VEXTRACTF32X4, VEXTRACTF64X2, VEXTRACTF32X8, VEXTRACTF64X4, VEXTRACTI32X4, VEXTRACTI64X2, VEXTRACTI32X8, VEXTRACTI64X4	Y	Y	N	Y
VINSERT	No	Yes	Yes	VINSERTF32x4, VINSERTF64X2, VINSERTF32X8, VINSERTF64x4, VINSERTI32X4, VINSERTI64X2, VINSERTI32X8, VINSERTI64X4	Y	Y	N	Y
VPABS	No	Yes	Yes	VPABSB, VPABSW, VPABSD, VPABSQ	Y	Y	Y	N
VPALIGNR	No	Yes	Yes	VPALIGNR	N	Y	Y	N
VPERM	No	Yes	Yes	VPERMD, VPERMILPD, VPERMILPS, VPERMPD, VPERMPS, VPERMQ	Y	Y	N	N
VPMADD	No	Yes	Yes	VPMADDUBSW VPMADDWD	N	Y	Y	N
VFMADD	No	No	Yes	VFMADD132PD, VFMADD213PD, VFMADD231PD, VFMADD132PS, VFMADD213PS, VFMADD231PS, VFMADD132SD, VFMADD213SD, VFMADD231SD, VFMADD132SS, VFMADD213SS, VFMADD231SS	Y	Y	N	N
VFMADDSUB	No	No	Yes	VFMADDSUB132PD, VFMADDSUB213PD, VFMADDSUB231PD, VFMADDSUB132PS, VFMADDSUB213PS, VFMADDSUB231PS	Y	Y	N	N
VFMSUBADD	No	No	Yes	VFMSUBADD132PD, VFMSUBADD213PD, VFMSUBADD231PD, VFMSUBADD132PS, VFMSUBADD213PS, VFMSUBADD231PS	Y	Y	N	N
VFMSUB	No	No	Yes	VFMSUB132PD, VFMSUB213PD, VFMSUB231PD, VFMSUB132PS, VFMSUB213PS, VFMSUB231PS, VFMSUB132SD, VFMSUB213SD, VFMSUB231SD, VFMSUB132SS, VFMSUB213SS, VFMSUB231SS	Y	Y	N	N
VFNMADD	No	No	Yes	VFNMADD132PD, VFNMADD213PD, VFNMADD231PD, VFNMADD132PS, VFNMADD213PS, VFNMADD231PS, VFNMADD132SD, VFNMADD213SD, VFNMADD231SD, VFNMADD132SS, VFNMADD213SS, VFNMADD231SS	Y	Y	N	N
VFNMSUB	No	No	Yes	VFNMSUB132PD, VFNMSUB213PD, VFNMSUB231PD, VFNMSUB132PS, VFNMSUB213PS, VFNMSUB231PS, VFNMSUB132SD, VFNMSUB213SD, VFNMSUB231SD, VFNMSUB132SS, VFNMSUB213SS, VFNMSUB231SS	Y	Y	N	N
VGATHER	No	No	Yes	VGATHERDPS, VGATHERDPD, VGATHERQPS, VGATHERQPD	Y	Y	N	N
VPGATHER	No	No	Yes	VPGATHERDD, VPGATHERDQ, VPGATHERQD, VPGATHERQQ	Y	Y	N	N
VPSRAV	No	No	Yes	VPSRAVW, VPSRAVD, VPSRAVQ	Y	Y	Y	N

== CPUs with AVX-512 ==
- Intel
  - Knights Landing (Xeon Phi x200): AVX-512 F, CD, ER, PF
  - Knights Mill (Xeon Phi x205): AVX-512 F, CD, ER, PF, 4FMAPS, 4VNNIW, VPOPCNTDQ
  - Skylake-SP, Skylake-X: AVX-512 F, CD, VL, DQ, BW
  - Cannon Lake: AVX-512 F, CD, VL, DQ, BW, IFMA, VBMI
  - Cascade Lake: AVX-512 F, CD, VL, DQ, BW, VNNI
  - Cooper Lake: AVX-512 F, CD, VL, DQ, BW, VNNI, BF16
  - Ice Lake, Rocket Lake: AVX-512 F, CD, VL, DQ, BW, IFMA, VBMI, VBMI2, VPOPCNTDQ, BITALG, VNNI, VPCLMULQDQ, GFNI, VAES
  - Tiger Lake (except Pentium and Celeron but some reviewer have the CPU-Z Screenshot of Celeron 6305 with AVX-512 support): AVX-512 F, CD, VL, DQ, BW, IFMA, VBMI, VBMI2, VPOPCNTDQ, BITALG, VNNI, VPCLMULQDQ, GFNI, VAES, VP2INTERSECT
  - Alder Lake (never officially supported by Intel, completely removed in newer CPUs^{Note 1}): AVX-512 F, CD, VL, DQ, BW, IFMA, VBMI, VBMI2, VPOPCNTDQ, BITALG, VNNI, VPCLMULQDQ, GFNI, VAES, BF16, VP2INTERSECT, FP16
  - Sapphire Rapids and later P-core-only Xeon processors: AVX-512 F, CD, VL, DQ, BW, IFMA, VBMI, VBMI2, VPOPCNTDQ, BITALG, VNNI, VPCLMULQDQ, GFNI, VAES, BF16, FP16
- Centaur Technology
  - "CNS" core (8c/8t): AVX-512 F, CD, VL, DQ, BW, IFMA, VBMI
- Hygon Information Technology
  - c86-4g core family: AVX-512 F, CD, VL, DQ, BW, IFMA, VBMI, VBMI2, VPOPCNTDQ, BITALG, VNNI, VPCLMULQDQ, GFNI, VAES, BF16, VP2INTERSECT
- AMD
  - Zen 4: AVX-512 F, CD, VL, DQ, BW, IFMA, VBMI, VBMI2, VPOPCNTDQ, BITALG, VNNI, VPCLMULQDQ, GFNI, VAES, BF16
  - Zen 5: Same as Zen 4 and VP2INTERSECT
  - Zen 6: Same as Zen 5 and FP16, BMM

Subset	F	CD	ER	PF	4FMAPS	4VNNIW	VPOPCNTDQ	VL	DQ	BW	IFMA	VBMI	VNNI	BF16	VBMI2	BITALG	VPCLMULQDQ	GFNI	VAES	VP2INTERSECT	FP16	BMM
Knights Landing (Xeon Phi x200, 2016)	Yes		Yes		No																	
Knights Mill (Xeon Phi x205, 2017)	Yes		Yes		Yes			No														
Skylake-SP, Skylake-X (2017)	Yes		No				No	Yes			No											
Cannon Lake (2018)	Yes		No				No	Yes			Yes		No									
Cascade Lake (2019)	Yes		No				No	Yes			No		Yes	No								
Cooper Lake (2020)	Yes		No				No	Yes			No		Yes	Yes	No							
Ice Lake (2019)	Yes		No				Yes							No	Yes					No		
Tiger Lake (2020)	Yes		No				Yes							No	Yes					Yes	No	
Rocket Lake (2021)	Yes		No				Yes							No	Yes					No		
Alder Lake (2021)	Partial^{Note 1}		No				Partial^{Note 1}															No
Zen 4 (2022)	Yes		No				Yes													No		
Sapphire Rapids (2023)	Yes		No				Yes													No	Yes	No
Zen 5 (2024)	Yes		No				Yes													Yes	No	
Zen 6 (TBD)	Yes		No				Yes															

^Note 1: Intel does not officially support AVX-512 family of instructions on the Alder Lake microprocessors. In early 2022, Intel began disabling in silicon (fusing off) AVX-512 in Alder Lake microprocessors to prevent customers from enabling AVX-512. In older Alder Lake family CPUs with some legacy combinations of BIOS and microcode revisions, it was possible to execute AVX-512 family instructions when disabling all the efficiency cores which do not contain the silicon for AVX-512.

== Performance ==
Intel Vectorization Advisor (starting from version 2017) supports native AVX-512 performance and vector code quality analysis (for "Core", Xeon and Intel Xeon Phi processors). Along with traditional hotspots profile, Advisor Recommendations and "seamless" integration of Intel Compiler vectorization diagnostics, Advisor Survey analysis also provides AVX-512 ISA metrics and new AVX-512-specific "traits", e.g. Scatter, Compress/Expand, mask utilization.

On some processors (mostly pre-Ice Lake Intel), AVX-512 instructions can cause a frequency throttling even greater than its predecessors, causing a penalty for mixed workloads. The additional downclocking is triggered by the 512-bit width of vectors and depends on the nature of instructions being executed; using the 128 or 256-bit part of AVX-512 (AVX-512VL) does not trigger it. As a result, gcc and clang default to prefer using the 256-bit vectors for Intel targets.

C/C++ compilers also automatically handle loop unrolling and preventing stalls in the pipeline in order to use AVX-512 most effectively, which means a programmer using language intrinsics to try to force use of AVX-512 can sometimes result in worse performance relative to the code generated by the compiler when it encounters loops plainly written in the source code. In other cases, using AVX-512 intrinsics in C/C++ code can result in a performance improvement relative to plainly written C/C++.

== Reception ==
There are many examples of AVX-512 applications, including media processing, cryptography, video games, neural networks, and even OpenJDK, which employs AVX-512 for sorting.

In a much-cited quote from 2020, Linus Torvalds said "I hope AVX-512 dies a painful death, and that Intel starts fixing real problems instead of trying to create magic instructions to then create benchmarks that they can look good on", stating that he would prefer the transistor budget be spent on additional cores and integer performance instead, and that he "detests" floating point benchmarks.

== See also ==
- AArch64 § Scalable Vector Extension (SVE) – a new vector instruction set (supplementing VFP and NEON) supporting very wide bit-widths, and single binary code that can adapt automatically to maximum width supported by hardware
- FMA instruction set (FMA)
- XOP instruction set (XOP)
