= OptiPlex =

Business-oriented line of computers by Dell

Dell OptiPlex
- Logo since 2018
- Developer: Dell
- Type: All-in-one PC
- Released: 1993
- Discontinued: January 2025
- Operating system: Windows, Linux
- CPU: Intel, AMD
- Graphics: Intel, ATI/AMD, Nvidia
- Marketing target: Business
- Successor: Dell Pro
- Related: Vostro, Latitude, Precision, XPS
- Website: Dell OptiPlex

OptiPlex (a portmanteau of "optimal" and "-plex") is a discontinued line of business-oriented desktop and all-in-one computers made for corporate enterprises, healthcare, the government, and education markets. Initially released in 1993 by Dell, these computers typically contain Intel CPUs, beginning with Celeron and Pentium and currently with the Core microarchitecture (i3, i5, i7, i9). Business-oriented components, such as Gigabit Ethernet, Display Port, tool-less Chassis and software such as data protection utilities, along with management features such as Intel vPro often come standard with OptiPlex systems. Their configurations can be completed by the purchaser for components such as CPU, GPU, RAM, storage and wireless options, as well as Dell Pro support.

== History ==
Dell released the OptiPlex and NetPlex lines in 1993 in the wake of its first quarterly loss. Its disappointing results were partially attributed to poor returns on its notebook division; however, Dell's desktop and server lines continued to see success, particularly within the enterprise market.

The new offerings were positioned accordingly. The NetPlex line consisted of inexpensive i486 workstations designed to be used as corporate network clients. The OptiPlex line offered the same networking capabilities as the NetPlex along with additional features such as VESA Local Bus expansion slots, expandable VRAM, and stronger processor models. It also targeted large enterprises with features such as embedded diagnostics.

On 6 January, 2025, Dell announced that they were consolidating their desktop and laptop product lines into three new simplified categories, with OptiPlex rebranding into Dell Pro alongside Latitude.

In January 2025 Dell announced a major restructuring that saw the demise of the OptiPlex brand, along with others. OptiPlex was folded into Dell Pro along with Latitude.

== Series 1 ==
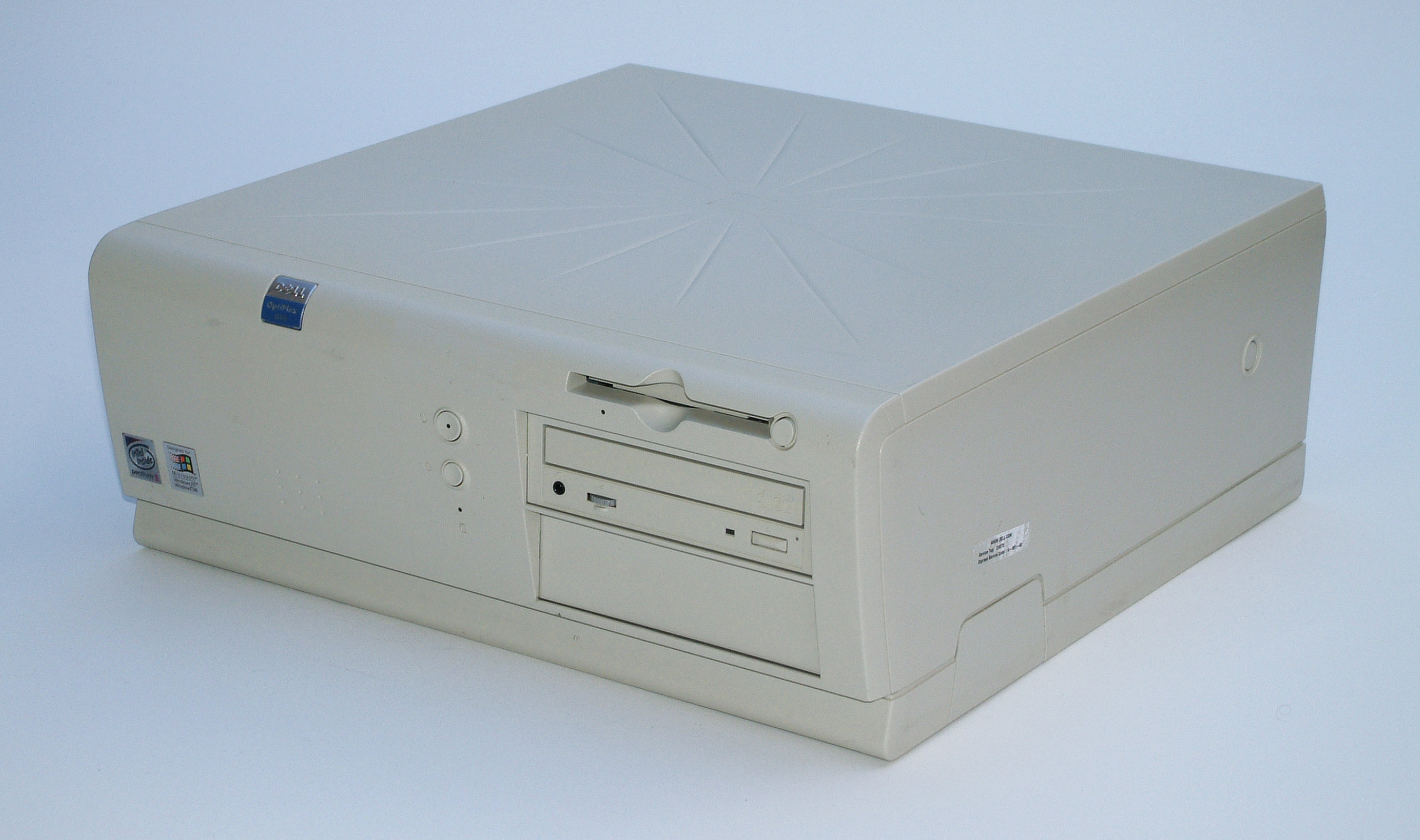
First generation Dell OptiPlex GX1 desktop workstation

Series 1 came in the classic beige chassis.

Form factors
Chassis	Models	Height	Width	Depth	external bays		internal bays
Chassis	Models	Height	Width	Depth	5.25"	3.5"	internal bays
NX1 Specific		9.27 cm (3.65 inches)	33.71 cm (13.27 inches)	34.93 cm (13.75 inches)	—N/a	—N/a	1x 3.5" HDD
SFF		9.14 cm (3.6 inches)	31.75 cm (12.5 inches)	37.8 cm (14.9 inches)	1 slim optical	1.44 floppy	1x 3.5" HDD
Low-profile desktop		10.9 cm (4.3 inches)	40.9 cm (16.1 inches)	43.7 cm (17.2 inches)	1	1.44 floppy	1x 3.5" HDD
Midsize desktop		16.5 cm (6.5 inches)	41.9 cm (16.5 inches)	44.5 cm (17.5 inches)	2	1.44 floppy	2x 3.5" HDD
Mini-tower	(GX400 Black chassis)	44.5 cm (17.5 inches)	20.6 cm (8.1 inches)	43.7 cm (17.2 inches)	3	1.44 floppy	2x 3.5" HDD

Models
Model	Release	Chipset	CPU	FSB	RAM Type	RAM Speed	RAM Max	Chassis	Comments	PCI /AGP /PCIe	USB
4xx LN (450/Le, 466/Le, 4100/Le)	1995	VLSI	i486 50, 66, 100 MHz	25/33 MHz	SIMM, 2	70 ns	64 MB	4 x 17 x 17	Cirrus Logic CL-GD5429, 1 MB	3x ISA, 2x VL (optional)	
5xx/L (560/L, 566/L)	1995	Intel 430LX	Pentium 60, 66	60/66 MHz	SIMM, 4			4 x 17 x 17	Cirrus Logic CL-GD5430, 1 MB	1x PCI, 2x ISA (1x shared)	
XL 5xxx	1996	Intel 82434NX PCI	Pentium 75, 90, 100, 120, 133	50/60/66 MHz	SIMM, 4	70 ns		ex, XL 575, XL 5133	From 8 to 64 MB (64 MiB) of RAM. 1995/1996		
XM 5xxx	1996	Intel 82430NX PCIset	Pentium 75, 90/120, 100/133	50/60/66 MHz	SIMM, 4	70 ns		6 x 16 x 16	S3 Vision 864, 1 MB standard, upgradable to 2 MB.		
XMT 5xxx	1996	Intel 82430NX PCIset	Pentium 75, 90/120, 100/133	50/60/66 MHz	SIMM, 4	70 ns		16.40 x 7.75 x 17.40	S3 Vision 864, 1 MB standard, upgradable to 2 MB.		
GXL 5xxx	1996	Intel 82430FX PCIset	Pentium 90, 120, 150, 100, 133, 166, 200	60/66 MHz	SIMM, 4	60-ns EDO or 70-ns fast-page mode		midsize			
GXM 5xxx	1996	Intel 82430FX	Pentium 90, 120, 150, 100, 133, 166, 200	60/66 MHz	SIMM, 4	60-ns EDO		4 x 17 x 17	S3 (Trio64V+) PCI, 2 MB.		
GXMT 5xxx	1996	Intel 82430FX PCIset	Pentium 90, 120, 150, 100, 133, 166, 200	60/66 MHz	SIMM, 4	60-ns EDO	128 MB	16.4 x 7.75 x 17.4	S3 (Trio64V+) PCI, 2 MB.		
GL and GL+	1996	Intel 82430FX PCI	Pentium 75, 90/120, 100/133/166	50/60/66 MHz	SIMM, 4	60-ns EDO or 70-ns fast-page mode		4 x 17 x 17	S3 764-P (Trio64), 1 MB standard, upgradable to 2 MB.		
GM and GM+	1996	Intel 82430FX PCIset	Pentium 75, 90/120, 100/133/166	50/60/66 MHz	SIMM, 4	60-ns EDO		6.0 x 17 x 17	S3 764-P (Trio64), 1 MB standard, upgradable to 2 MB.		
GMT and GMT+	1996	Intel 82430FX PCIset	Pentium 75, 90/120, 100/133/166	50/60/66 MHz	SIMM, 4	60-ns EDO		16.4 x 7.75 x 17.4	S3 764-P (Trio64), 1 MB standard, upgradable to 2 MB.		
Gs, Gs+	1996	Intel 430FX PCI	Pentium 133, 166, 200	66 MHz	SIMM, 4	60-ns EDO		low-profile, midsize	S3 (Trio64V+) PCI, 2 MB, Gs+ contains onboard Ethernet.		
GXpro	1997	Intel 82440FX PCIset	Pentium Pro 180, 200	60 or 66 MHz	SDRAM, 4	PC66		midsize, minitower			
GXpro	1997	Intel 82440FX PCIset	Pentium Pro 180, 200	60 or 66 MHz	DRAM, 4	60-ns EDO		midsize, minitower	60ns EDO DRAM DIMM		USB
GXi	1996	Intel 430HX PCIset	Pentium 133-200, Pentium MMX 166-233	66 MHz	3.3v EDO DIMM, 4	60-ns EDO	512 MB	Low-profile, Midsize, Minitower	S3 (Trio64V+) 86C765		USB
Gn/Gn+	1996	Intel 430TX PCIset	Pentium MMX 166-233	66 MHz	SDRAM, 2	PC66		Low-profile, Midsize, Minitower			
N	1996	Intel 430TX PCIset	Pentium MMX 166-233	66 MHz	SDRAM, 2	PC66		3.65 x 13.27 x 13.75	S3 Trio64V2 86C785, 2 MB.		
GXa	1997	Intel 82440LX PCI/AGP	Pentium II Klamath 233, 266, 300, 333	66 MHz	SDRAM, 3	PC66		Low-profile, Midsize, Minitower	Slot 1		USB 1.1 x2
NX	1997	Intel 82440LX PCI/AGP	Pentium II 266-333	66 MHz	SDRAM, 3	PC66		3.65 x 13.27 x 13.75	Integrated ATI 3D Rage Pro (2X AGP) graphics, Video memory 2 MB (upgradable to 4 MB) SGRAM	1x PCI	
G1	1998	Intel 440BX AGP set	Pentium II 266-333, 350-450 or Celeron 266-400 MHz	66 or 100 MHz	SDRAM, 2	PC100		Low-profile, Midsize, Minitower	Introduced in June 1998. Along with the IBM 300PL, one of the most widely used business desktops of the 1999–2005 era.		
E1	1997	Intel 440EX AGPset	Celeron 266-400	66 MHz	SDRAM, 2	PC100		Low-profile, Minitower	Slot 1		
NX1	1999	Intel 440BX PIIX4e	Pentium II 266, 333, 350-450 or Pentium III 450 MHz	66/100 MHz	SDRAM, 3	PC100 (ECC or non-ECC)	384 MB	3.65 x 13.27 x 13.75	Integrated ATI Rage Pro (2X AGP), 4 MB (upgradable to 8 MB) SGRAM. First PIII model.	1x PCI	USB 1.1 x2
GX1	1998-1999	Intel 440BX PIIX4e	Pentium II 266, 333, 350-450 or Pentium III 450-600 MHz	66 or 100 MHz	SDRAM, 3	PC100 (ECC or non-ECC)	768 MB	SFF, low-profile, midsize, minitower	Integrated ATI Rage Pro 4 MB (up. to 8 MB). GX1 machines used Slot 1 Pentium II and Pentium III CPUs.	2x, 3x or 5x PCI 2x, 3x or 4x ISA	USB 1.1 x2
GX1p	1999	Intel 440BX AGPSet	Pentium II 400, 450 or Pentium III 450-600	100 MHz	SDRAM, 3	PC100 (ECC or non-ECC)	768 MB	midsize, minitower	Integrated ATI Rage Pro 8 MB.	3x or 5x PCI 3x or 4x ISA	USB 1.1 x2
GC	1999	Intel 810e	Pentium III or Celeron	66/100 MHz	SDRAM, 2	PC100		SFF			
GX100	2000	Intel 810	Celeron Mendocino and Coppermine	66/100 MHz	SDRAM, 2	PC100		SFF, low-profile, minitower	Socket 370. Some motherboards do not accept the Coppermine Celeron.	No AGP slot	USB 1.1 x2
GX110	2000	Intel 810e	Pentium III Coppermine	66/100 MHz	SDRAM, 2	PC100	512 MB	SFF, low-profile, midsize (370 only), minitower	Slot1 or Socket 370 CPU.		USB 1.1 x2
GX115	2000	Intel 815E	Pentium III or Celeron	100/133 MHz	SDRAM	PC100/PC133	512 MB	SFF, low-profile, minitower	Price cut in 2000-11-06 after GX150 release		
GX200	2000	Intel 820 PCI/AGP	Pentium III	100/133 MHz	RDRAM, 2	PC800	1 GB	SFF, low-profile, midsize, minitower			
GX300	2000	Intel 820 PCI/AGP	Pentium III	100/133 MHz	RDRAM, 2	PC600 or PC800	1 GB	Minitower	1 or 2 CPUS, typically Slot1.	1x 4X AGP 5x PCI |	
GX400	2001	Intel 850	Pentium 4	400 MHz	RDRAM, 4	PC800	2 GB	Minitower	Black classic style chassis. Socket 423	1x AGP, 5x PCI	4x USB 1.1
Model	Release	Chipset	CPU	FSB	RAM Type	RAM Speed	RAM Max	Chassis	Comments	PCI /AGP /PCIe	USB

== Series 2 ==
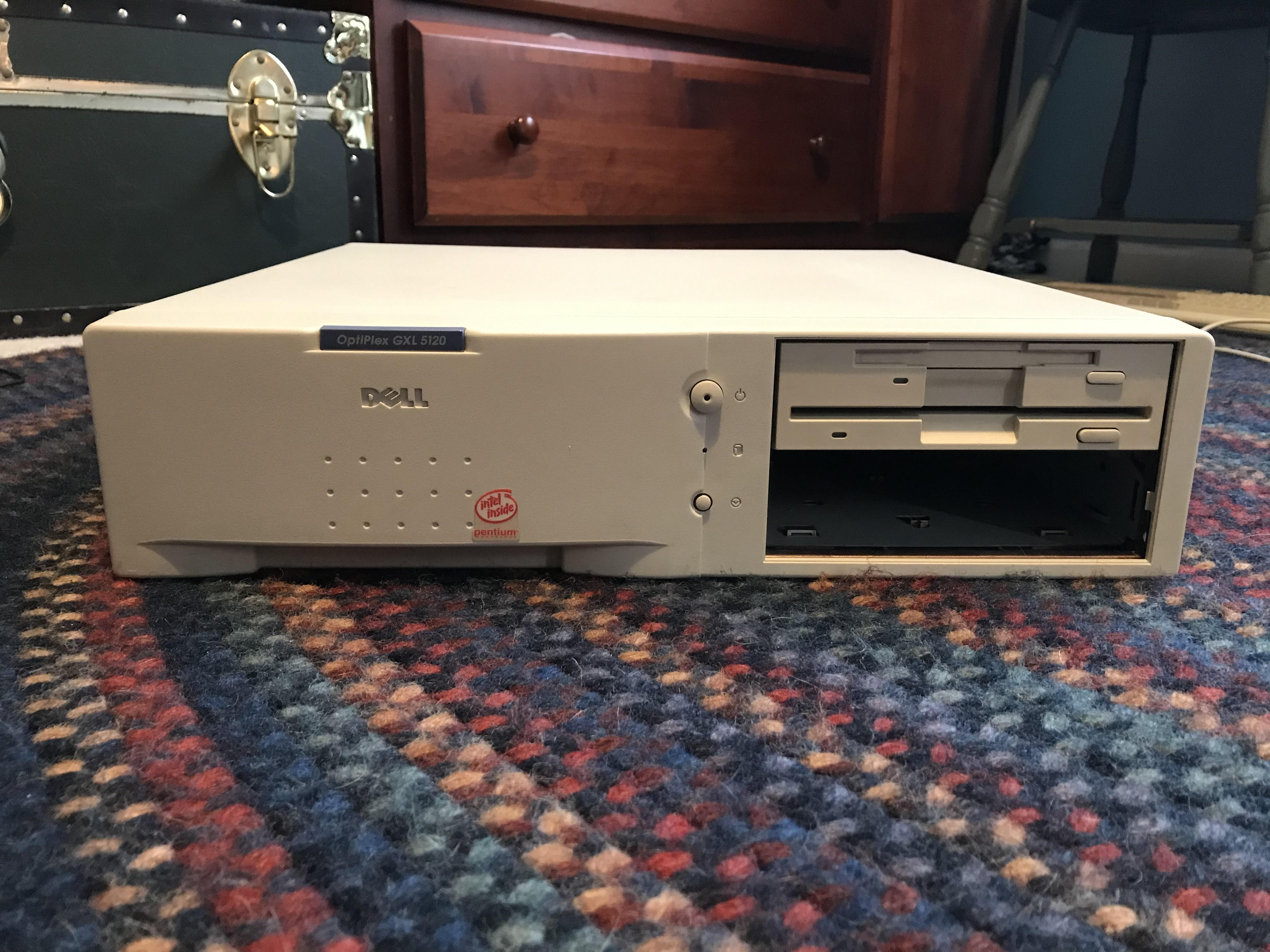
Second generation 1995 Dell OptiPlex GXL desktop computer

Series 2 came in the midnight-gray chassis.

Form factors
Chassis	Models	Height	Width	Depth	Expansion Card Slots	External Bays		Internal Bays	Power Supply
Chassis	Models	Height	Width	Depth	Expansion Card Slots	5.25"	3.5"	Internal Bays	Power Supply
Mini Tower	160L to 170L	36.8 cm (14.5 Inches)	18.4 (7.25 inches)	42.6 cm (16.75 inches)	4x Full Height	2	1	1x 3.5" (Optional 2x)	250 W
USFF	SX260 to SX270	24.7 cm (9.9 inches)	24.2 cm (9.7 inches)	8.5 cm (3.4 inches)	N/A	1 Media Bay	—N/a	1x 3.5" HDD	150 W 6-Pin Power Adapter
SF/SFF	GX50 to GX280	9.0 cm (3.57 inches)	31.9 cm (12.54 inches)	35.4 cm (13.93 inches)	2x Half Height	1 slim optical	1 slim floppy	1x 3.5" HDD	160 W
Small Desktop (SD) / Desktop (DT)	GX50 to GX280 Inc 170L	10.6 cm (4.2 inches)	38.9 cm (15.3 inches)	43.2 cm (17 inches)	1x Half Height, 2x Full Height (Riser)	1	1.44 floppy	1x 3.5" HDD	180 W
Small Mini Tower (SMT) / Mini Tower (MT)	L60/GX240 to GX280	42.5 cm (16.7 inches)	18.1 cm (7.13 inches)	44.7 cm (17.6 inches)	5x Full Height	2	(1) + 1.44 floppy	2x 3.5" HDD	250 W

Models
Model	Release	Chipset	CPU	FSB	RAM Type	RAM Speed	RAM Max	Chassis	Comments	Storage	PCI /AGP /PCIe	USB
GX150	2000	Intel 815E	Pentium III or Celeron	100/133 MHz	SDRAM, 2	PC133	512 MB	SFF, desktop, minitower	First to have new midnight-gray chassis. One of the last Dells to support two floppy drives. Product Announcement Date:Dec 1, 2000			USB 1.1
GX50	2001	Intel 810 or Intel 810E	Pentium III or Celeron	66/100 MHz	SDRAM, 2	PC100	512 MB	SFF, desktop, minitower	Models up to 800 MHz have the 810, 850 MHz and up have 810E		No AGP slot	
GX240	2001	Intel 845	Pentium 4 1.5-2.0 Willamette or 2.2-2.8 Northwood	400 MHz	SDRAM	PC133 (ECC or non-ECC)	1 GB	SF, SD, SMT	First Socket 478 Pentium 4 OptiPlex Lacks onboard graphics, AGP Graphics card required			USB 1.1
GX260	2002	Intel 845G	Pentium 4 or Celeron	400/533 MHz	DDR	PC2700 (200/266)	2 GB	SF, SD, SMT	Socket 478	SFF and DT: 1x 3.5, MT, 2 × 3.5 SATA	SFF: 2x PCI, DT: 3x PCI, MT: 1x AGP, 4x PCI	USB 2.0 x6 (4 rear, 2 front),
GX60	2002	Intel 845GL or Intel 845GV	Celeron	400 MHz	DDR	PC2100 or PC2700	2 GB	SFF, desktop, minitower	845GV supports PC2700 and 533 MHz FSB CPUs.		No AGP or PCI-Express slots	USB 2.0
SX260	2002	Intel 845G	Pentium 4 1.5-2.0 Willamette or 2.0-2.6 Northwood (or Celeron)	400/533 MHz	DDR, 2	PC1600 or PC2100	2 GB	USFF	Socket 478	1x 2.5"	N/A	USB 2.0 6x
L60	2002	Intel 845GL	Pentium 4 or Celeron (Northwood)	400 MHz	DDR, 2	PC2100	2 GB	SF, DT, MT	One of the last Dells to support Windows 98.	SFF and DT: 1x 3.5, MT, 2 × 3.5 PATA		USB 2.0 6x
160L	2002	Intel 845GV	Pentium 4 or Celeron (Northwood)	400 MHz	DDR, 2	PC2100 or PC2700	2 GB	MT	MT shares chassis with the Dell Dimension 2400 Has a different front bezel	2 × 3.5 PATA	3x PCI	USB 2.0 6x
GX270	2003	Intel 865G	Pentium 4 and P4 (HT) or Celeron (Prescott)	400/ 533/ 800 MHz	DDR, 2 (SFF board)/4 (other boards); 333/400	PC2700 or PC3200	2 GB	SF, DT, MT	Socket 478 Intel graphics or dedicated 8x AGP card.	SATA + PATA	1x 8X AGP, 4x PCI	USB 2.0 6x
SX270	2003	Intel 865G	Pentium 4 and P4 (HT) or Celeron (Prescott)	400/ 533/ 800 MHz	DDR, 2	PC2700 or PC3200	1 GB	USFF	Optional stand and cable cover.	1x 2.5"	N/A	USB 2.0 6x
170L	2004	Intel 865GV	Pentium 4 or Celeron (Prescott)	400/ 533/ 800 MHz	DDR, 2	PC2700 or PC3200	2 GB	DT, MT	MT shares chassis with the Dell Dimension 4600, however two DIMMs, AGP and one SATA port have been omitted. Has a different front bezel	MT: 2x 3.5, DT: 1 × 3.5 PATA	MT: 3x PCI, DT: 1x PCI (3x PCI with optional riser)	USB 2.0 6x
GX280	2004	Intel 915G	Pentium 4 (HT) or Celeron D (Prescott)	400/ 533/ 800 MHz	DDR2, 4 (SF, 2)	400/533	4 GB	SF, SD, MT	PS/2 connectors available only via optional accessory card that includes 9-pin serial connector.	SFF and DT: 1x 3.5, MT, 2 × 3.5 SATA	SFF: 1x PCIe x16, 1x PCI, DT: 1x PCIe (Riser), 2x PCI, MT: 1x PCe x16, 1x PCIe 1x, 3x PCI	USB 2.0 x8
Model	Release	Chipset	CPU	FSB	RAM Type	RAM Speed	RAM Max	Chassis	Comments	Storage	PCI /AGP /PCIe	USB

== Series 3 ==
Dell OptiPlex from 2005 to 2009 followed Intel's BTX standard. The first model to sport the new BTX layout was the uncommon BTX version of the GX280 The last model to be BTX is the OptiPlex 780. 7xx Series DT models can be configured with a riser card to accommodate two full height cards. The riser card fits over the top PCIe x16 slot and middle PCI which is slightly longer with extra pins, this is however not PCI-X. Features DirectDetect system health status indicators for troubleshooting and diagnostics.

Form factors
Chassis	Models	Image	Height	Width	Depth	Expansion Card Slots	External Bays		Internal Bays	Power Supply
Chassis	Models	Image	Height	Width	Depth	Expansion Card Slots	5.25"	3.5"	Internal Bays	Power Supply
USFF	SX280 to 760		23.7 cm (9.3 inches)	6.5 cm (2.6 inches)	24.0 cm (9.4 inches)	—N/a	1 D/Bay Module (Optical or Floppy, common with Latitude)	—N/a	3.5" HDD	180 W or 220 W 8-Pin Power Adapter
SFF	GX520/GX280 to 780		31.37 cm (12.35 inches)	9.26 cm (3.65 inches)	34.03 cm (13.4 inches)	2 Low profile	1 Slim optical	1	3.5" HDD	235 W
DT	GX280 to 780		39.9 cm (15.7 inches)	11.4 cm (4.5 inches)	35.3 cm (13.9 inches)	3 Low profile and 4 Low profile for 960/980 Models A riser card is available which converts a low profile PCIe x16 and PCI or two PCI or one PCIe x16 and PCI full height. the last PCI (and PCIe x16 on 960/980) remains low profile.	1	1	2x 3.5" HDD	255 W
MT	GX280 to 780		41.4 cm (16.3 inches)	18.5 cm (7.3 inches)	43.9 cm (17.3 inches)	4 Full height	2	1	2x 3.5" HDD	255 W or 305 W

Models
Model	Release	Chipset	CPU	FSB	RAM Type	RAM Speed	RAM Max	Chassis	Comments	Storage	PCI /AGP /PCIe	USB
GX280 BTX	2004	Intel 915G	Pentium 4 (HT) or Celeron D (Prescott)	400/ 533/ 800 MHz	DDR2, 4 (SF, 2)	400/533	4 GB	SF, SD, MT	Rare BTX Version of the GX280	MT: 2x 3.5, DT and SFF: 1 × 3.5 SATA	MT and DT: 2x PCI, SFF: 1x PCI	USB 2.0 x8
SX280	2004	Intel 915G	Pentium 4 or Celeron (Prescott)	533/800 MHz	DDR2, 2	400	2 GB	USFF	DVI-I port. No PS/2.	3.5 SATA	N/A	USB 2.0 7x
210L	2006	Intel 915GV	Pentium 4 or Celeron (Prescott)	533/800 MHz	DDR2, 2	400/533	4 GB	DT, MT	integrated Intel GMA 900. Socket 775	DT: 1x 3.5, MT: 2x 3.5	1x PCIe x1, 2x PCI	USB 2.0 6x
GX520	2005	Intel 945 Express	Pentium 4, or Celeron D (Prescott)	533/800 MHz	DDR2, 2	400/533	4 GB (3.5 GB Usable)	SFF, DT, MT	integrated Intel GMA 950. Socket 775	MT: 2x 3.5, DT and SFF: 1 × 3.5 SATA	MT and DT: 2x PCI, SFF: 1x PCI	USB 2.0 8x
GX620	2005	Intel 945 Express	Pentium 4, Pentium D, or Celeron (Prescott)	533/800 MHz	DDR2, 4	533/667	4 GB (3.5 GB Usable)	USFF, SFF, DT, MT	The latest models with a trusted platform module. The USFF cable cover increases the dimensions of the machine (available in standard and extended sizes). PS/2 connectors available only via optional accessory card that includes 9-pin serial connector. Up to Radeon X600	MT: 2x 3.5, DT, SFF and USFF: 1 × 3.5 SATA	MT: 1x PCIe x16, 1x PCIe x1, 2x PCI, DT: 1x PCIe x16, 2x PCI, SFF: 1x PCIe x15, 1x PCI	USB 2.0 8x
320	2006	ATI Radeon Xpress 1100 Professional	Intel Pentium D, Pentium 4 (HT), Celeron D (Cedar Mill/Conroe)	533 MHz	DDR2, 2	533	4 GB	DT, MT	Up to Radeon X300 or X1300	MT: 2x 3.5, DT, SFF and USFF: 1 × 3.5 PATA	1x PCIe x16, 2x PCI	USB 2.0 x6 (4 rear, 2 front)
745	2006	Intel 965 Express	Intel Pentium D, 4 (HT) and Dual core, Celeron D, Core 2 Duo (Cedar Mill/Conroe)	533/ 800/ 1066 MHz	DDR2, 4 (USFF: 2)	533/667/800	8 GB (USFF 4 GB)	USFF, SFF, DT, MT	*Only latest BIOS Supports Core 2 Quad and 8 GB DDR2. USFF does not support 2 GB/800 memory units. A 2 GB/800. Up to Radeon X1300 Pro	MT: 2x 3.5, DT, SFF and USFF: 1 × 3.5 SATA	MT: 1x PCIe x16, 1x PCIe x1, 2x PCI, DT: 1x PCIe x16, 2x PCI, SFF: 1x PCIe x15, 1x PCI	USB 2.0 x8
745c	2006	Intel Q965 Express	Intel Pentium D, 4 and Dual core, Celeron D, Core 2 Duo (Cedar Mill/Conroe)	533/ 800/ 1066 MHz	DDR2, 4 (USFF: 2)	533/667/800	8 GB (USFF 4 GB)	USFF, SFF, desktop, minitower	Intel VPro support Up to Radeon X1300 Pro	MT: 2x 3.5, DT, SFF and USFF: 1 × 3.5 SATA	MT: 1x PCIe x16, 1x PCIe x1, 2x PCI, DT: 1x PCIe x16, 2x PCI, SFF: 1x PCIe x15, 1x PCI	USB 2.0 x8
330	Late 2007	Intel G31 Express	Intel Core 2 Duo/Quad, Pentium Dual Core, Celeron, Celeron D (Conroe)	533/ 800/ 1066/ 1333* MHz	DDR2, 2	533/667/800	8 GB*	DT, MT	*Only latest BIOS Supports Core 2 Quad Processors, 1333 FSB and 8 GB DDR2 Up to Radeon 2400 XT	MT: 2x 3.5, DT 1 × 3.5 SATA	1x PCIe x16, 2x PCI	USB 2.0 8x
755	Mid 2007	Intel Q35 Express	Intel Core 2 Duo/Quad, Pentium Dual-Core, Celeron (Conroe)	800/ 1066/ 1333 MHz	DDR2, 4 (USFF: 2)	667/800	8 GB (USFF 4 GB)	MT, DT, SFF, USFF	USFF only has 2 DIMM slots and maximum 4 GB memory. Up to Radeon 2400 XT	MT: 2x 3.5, DT, SFF and USFF: 1 × 3.5 SATA	MT: 1x PCIe x16, 1x PCIe x1, 2x PCI, DT: 1x PCIe x16, 2x PCI, SFF: 1x PCIe x15, 1x PCI	USB 2.0 8x
360	Late 2008	Intel G31 Express	Intel Core 2 Duo/Quad*, Pentium Dual Core, Celeron D (Conroe)	533/ 800/ 1066/MHz	DDR2, 2	533/667/800	4 GB	DT, MT	*Only latest BIOS Supports Core 2 Quad and 1333 FSB Up to Radeon HD 3450 or GeForce 9300 GE	MT: 2x 3.5, DT 1 × 3.5 SATA	1x PCIe x16, 2x PCI	USB 2.0 8x
740	2008	NVIDIA Quadro NVS 210S (with nForce 430 MCP)	AMD Athlon 64 X2, Athlon 64, AMD Phenom	1066 MHz	DDR2, 4	533/667/800	8 GB	SFF, DT, MT	Integrated Quadro NVS 210S video Up to Radeon HD 3470, 2400 XT or GeForce 9300 GE	MT: 2x 3.5, DT and SFF: 1 × 3.5 SATA	MT: PCI x2, PCIe x16 x1, PCIe x1 x1 DT: PCI x2, PCIe x16 x1 SFF: PCI x1, PCIe x16 x1	USB 2.0 x7 (5 rear, 2 front)
760	Late 2008	Intel Q43	Intel Core 2 Duo/Quad, Pentium Dual Core, Celeron (Wolfdale)	800/ 1066/ 1333 MHz	DDR2, 4	667/800	8 GB	MT, DT, SFF, USFF	USFF only has 2 DIMM slots and maximum 4 GB memory Up to Radeon HD 3470, DisplayPort	MT: 2x 3.5, DT, SFF and USFF: 1 × 3.5 SATA	MT: 1x PCIe x16, 1x PCIe x1, 2x PCI, DT: 1x PCIe x16, 2x PCI, SFF: 1x PCIe x15, 1x PCI	USB 2.0 8x
160	2008	SiSM671	Intel Atom 230 or 330	533 MHz	DDR2, 2	667	4 GB	Tiny Desktop	Also marketed as FX160	1x 2.5	—N/a	USB 2.0 6x
380	Late 2009	Intel G41	Intel Core 2 Duo/Quad, Pentium Dual Core, Celeron (Wolfdale)	800/ 1066/ 1333 MHz	DDR3, 2	1066	8 GB	SFF, DT, MT	Up to Radeon HD 3450 or GeForce 9300 GE	MT: 2x 3.5, DT and SFF: 1 × 3.5 SATA	MT: PCI x2, PCIe x16 x1, PCIe x1 x1 DT: PCI x2, PCIe x16 x1 SFF: PCI x1, PCIe x16 x1 USFF: -	USB 2.0 8x
580	Early 2010	AMD 785G	AMD Sempron, Athlon II X2, Athlon II, AMD Phenom II (AMD K10)	1066/ 1333 MHz	DDR3, 4	1333	16 GB	SFF, DT, MT	Chassis similar to 7xx Series but lacks parallel port DisplayPort, Up to Radeon HD 3470, 4550, GeForce 9300 GE, or Quadro NVS 420	MT: 2x 3.5, DT and SFF 1 × 3.5 SATA	MT: PCI x2, PCIe x16 x2, DT, PCI x1, PCIe x16 x2, SFF: PCIe x2	USB 2.0
780	Late 2009	Intel Q45	Intel Core 2 Duo/Quad, Pentium Dual Core, Celeron (Wolfdale)	800/ 1066/ 1333 MHz	DDR3, 4	1066/1333	16 GB	(USFF Model 780 wasn't until Series 4) SFF, DT, MT	USFF chassis was released separately and resembles the OptiPlex 9xx case and a maximum of 8 GB RAM due to 2 DIMM slots. DisplayPort, Up to Radeon HD 3470, GeForce 9300 GE or Quadro NVS 420	MT: 2x 3.5, DT and SFF: 1x 3.5, USFF: 1 × 2.5 SATA II	MT: 1x PCIe x16, 1x PCIe x1, 2x PCI, DT: 1x PCIe x16, 2x PCI, SFF: 1x PCIe x15, 1x PCI	USB 2.0 x8 (6 rear, 2 front)
Model	Release	Chipset	CPU	FSB	RAM Type	RAM Speed	RAM Max	Chassis	Comments	Storage	PCI /AGP /PCIe	USB

=== Capacitor issues ===
OptiPlex models (mostly produced in 2003 and 2004), notably the GX270, suffered from frequent failures due to faulty capacitors supplied by Nichicon as part of the capacitor plague. These capacitors would bulge and leak, resulting in product failure after only a few years of use. Leaked internal documents allege that Dell knew that the computers were likely to fail, and continued to ship them.

== Series 4 ==
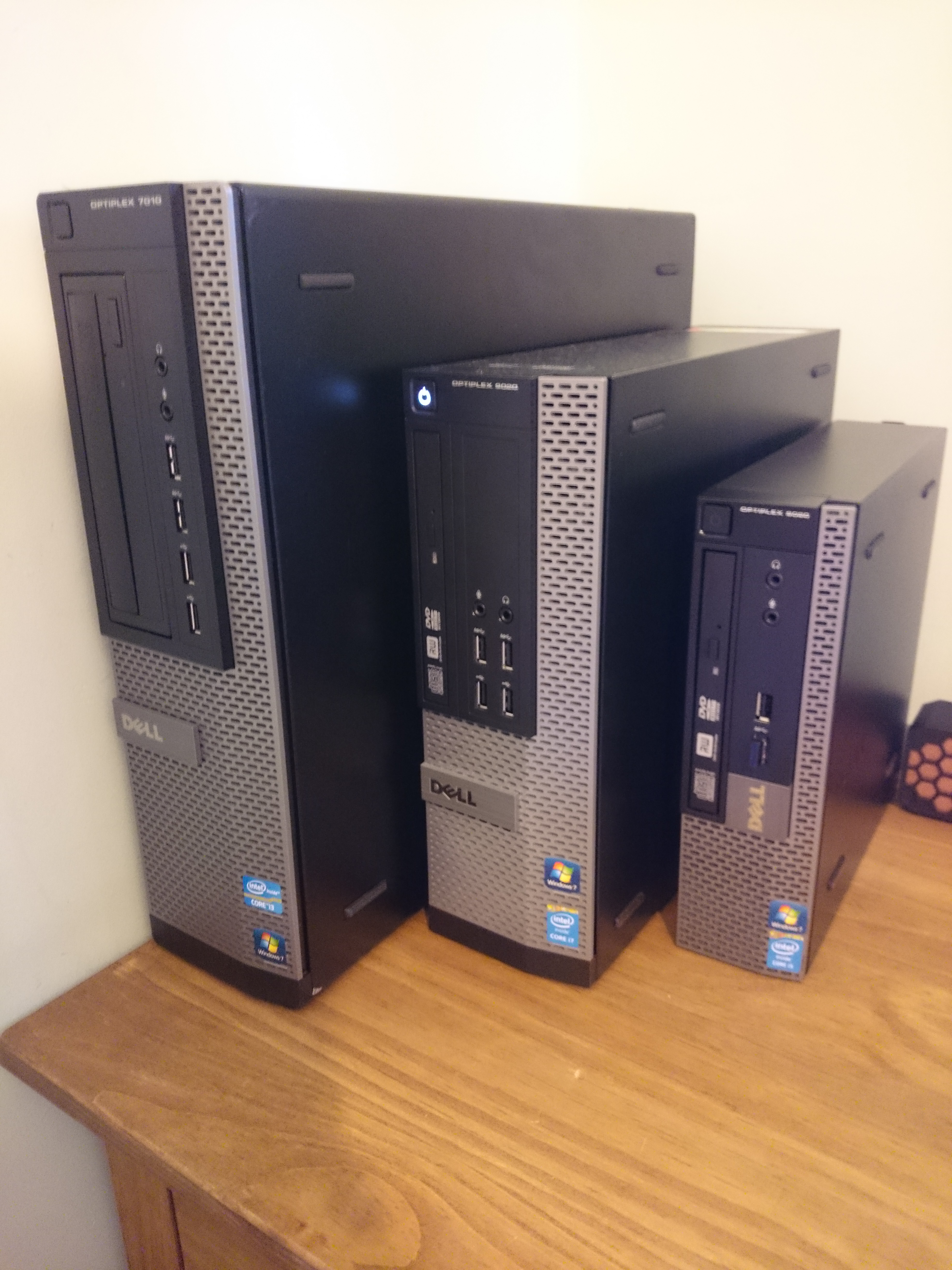
Dell OptiPlex Series 4 DT, SFF and USFF Chassis

The OptiPlex 960 introduced a new style of cases, made with recyclable plastics. The first two models, namely the 960 and 980 were based on BTX, However the rest of this series was built upon the standard ATX and DTX. From the x020 and onwards, Dell switched over from a standard 24 pin power connector to a proprietary 12v only 8 pin connector for better power efficiency. The DT and SFF models from this series used standard TFX and LFX power supplies, respectively (the LFX power supplies do have a nonstandard depth of 240 mm, however), while the MT models used standard ATX power supplies.

Form factors
Chassis	Models	Image	Height	Width	Depth	Expansion Card Slots	External Bays		Internal Bays	Power Supply
Chassis	Models	Image	Height	Width	Depth	Expansion Card Slots	5.25"	3.5"	Internal Bays	Power Supply
SFF BTX	960, 980 and XE only		28.96 cm (11.40 inches)	8.52 cm (3.35 inches)	32.36 cm (12.74 inches)	2 (low-profile)	1 Slim Optical	1	3.5" HDD	235 W (80+ Gold Optional)(OptiPlex XE 280 W 80+ Silver)
DT BTX	960, 980 and XE only		39.65 cm (15.61 inches)	10.93 cm (4.30 inches)	34.80 cm (13.70 inches)	4 (low-profile), a riser card is available for the DT. This converts a low profile PCIe x16 and PCI or two PCI full height. the last two remain low profile.	1	1	3.5" HDD	255 W (80+ Gold Optional)(OptiPlex XE 300 W 80+ Silver)
MT BTX	960, 980 only		40.80 cm (16.06 inches)	18.70 cm (7.36 inches)	43.08 cm (16.96 inches)	4 (full-height)	2	1	2x 3.5" HDD	305 W (80+ Gold Optional)
USFF	780 to 9020		23.70 cm (9.33 inches)	6.50 cm (2.56 inches)	24.00 cm (9.45 inches)	—N/a	1 (slim-line)	—N/a	2.5" HDD	200 W 80+ Gold (OptiPlex 780 180 W 80+ Gold)
SFF DTX	790 to 9020		29.00 cm (11.42 inches)	9.26 cm (3.65 inches)	31.20 cm (12.28 inches)	2 (low-profile)	1 (slim-line)	—N/a	3.5" HDD	240 W 80+ Bronze or Gold (OptiPlex XE2 315 W 80+ Gold)
DT	790 to 9010		36.00 cm (14.17 inches)	10.20 cm (4.02 inches)	41.0 cm (16.14 inches)	4 (low-profile)	1	—N/a	3.5" & 2.5" HDD	250 W 80+ Bronze or Gold
MT	790 to 9020	OptiPlex 7010 Mini Tower	36.00 cm (14.17 inches)	17.50 cm (6.89 inches)	41.70 cm (16.42 inches)	4 (full-height)	2	—N/a	2x 3.5" HDD	290 W 80+ Bronze or Gold (OptiPlex XE2 365 W 80+ Gold)

Models
Model	Release	Chipset	CPU	FSB	RAM Type	RAM Speed	RAM Max	Chassis	Comments	Display	Storage	PCI/AGP/PCIe	USB
Entry line
390	Mid 2011	Intel H61	Intel Core i3, i5 (2nd gen/Sandy Bridge)	DMI 2.0	DDR3, 2	1066	16 GB	MT, DT, SFF, USFF	Chassis similar to 9xx OptiPlex Up to Radeon HD 6450	N/A	SATA II x4 (MT), x2 (SFF)	MT PCIe x16, 3x PCIe x1 (Full height) DT PCIe x16, 3x PCIe x1 (Half height) SFF PCIe x16, PCIe x1 (Half height)	USB 2.0 x6 (4 rear, 2 front)
3010	Mid 2012	Intel H61	Intel 2nd gen/Sandy Bridge Core i3, Pentium or Celeron; 3rd gen/Ivy Bridge Intel Core i3, i5, or Pentium	DMI 2.0	DDR3, 2	1333	16 GB	MT, DT, SFF, USFF, All-in-one	Chassis similar to 9xxx OptiPlex Up to Radeon HD 7570	N/A	SATA II x4 (MT), x2 (SFF)	MT PCIe x16, 3x PCIe x1 (Full height) DT PCIe x16, 3x PCIe x1 (Half height) SFF PCIe x16, PCIe x1 (Half height)	USB 2.0 x8 (6 rear, 2 front)
3011	Mid 2013	Intel B75	Intel Core i3, i5, Pentium, Celeron (3rd gen/Ivy Bridge)	DMI 2.0	DDR3l, 2 SODIMM	1600	8 GB	All-in-one	—N/a	20" 1600x900	SATA II x1	—N/a	USB 2.0 x4 (rear) USB 3.0 x2 (Side)
3020	Late 2013	Intel H81	Intel Core i3, i5, Pentium, Celeron (4th gen/Haswell)	DMI 2.0	DDR3, 2	1600	16 GB	MT, SFF, Micro	Chassis similar to 9xxx OptiPlex Up to Radeon R7 250	N/A	SATA III x3, (MT) x2 (SFF)	MT: PCIe x16, 3 PCIe x1 SFF (half-height): PCIe x16, PCIe x1 Micro: M.2	MT & SFF: USB 2.0 x6, 3.0 x2 Micro: USB 2.0 x4, 3.0 x2
3030	Early 2014	Intel H81	Intel Core i3, i5, Pentium, Celeron (4th gen/Haswell)	DMI 2.0	DDR3, 2 SODIMM	1600	16 GB	All-in-one	Gigabit Ethernet, VGA Up to Radeon R5 A240	19.5" 1600x900 (IPS, Touch Optional)	SATA III x, 2.5" Bay	—N/a	USB 2.0 x4, 3.0 x2
Mainstream line
780	Late 2009	Intel Q45	Intel Core 2 Duo, (Note: doesn't support Quad Extreme) Pentium Dual Core, Celeron	800/ 1066/ 1333 MHz	DDR3, 2	1066/1333	8 GB	USFF	USFF chassis was released separately and resembles the OptiPlex 9xx case, does not support Quad Extreme	—N/a	SATA II x1 Dell Wireless 1510 mini PCIe WLAN card (802.11n); Dell Wireless 1520 mini PCIe WLAN card (802.11n)	—N/a	USB 2.0 x7 (5 rear, 2 front)
790	Early 2011	Intel Q65	Intel Core i3, i5 i7 (2nd gen/Sandy Bridge)	DMI 1.0	DDR3, 4	1066/1333	16 GB	MT, DT, SFF, USFF	Chassis similar to 9xx OptiPlex Up to Radeon HD 6450	N/A	SATA II x2 (USFF), x3 (SFF, DT, MT)	MT & DT (DT half height): PCI, PCIe x16, PCIe x16 (wired as x4), PCIe x1 SFF (half height): PCIe x16, PCIe x16 (wired as x4); USFF: miniPCIe	USB 2.0, optional USB 3.0 PCIe card
7010	Mid 2012	Intel Q77	Intel Core i3, i5, i7 or Pentium; 3rd gen/Ivy Bridge	DMI 2.0	DDR3, 4	1600	32 GB	MT, DT, SFF, USFF	Chassis similar to 9xxx OptiPlex Up to Radeon HD 7570	N/A	SATA III (Max 2) & SATA II, x2 (USFF), x3 (SFF and DT), 4x (MT)	MT & DT (DT half height): PCI, PCIe x16, PCIe x16 (wired as x4), PCIe x1 SFF (half height): PCIe x16, PCIe x16 (wired as x4); USFF: miniPCIe	MT, DT, & SFF: USB 2.0 x6, 3.0 x4 USFF: USB 2.0 x4, 3.0 x4
7020	Mid 2014	Intel Q87	Intel Core i3, i5, i7, Pentium (4th gen/Haswell)	DMI 2.0	DDR3, 4	1600	32 GB	MT, SFF	Chassis similar to 9xxx OptiPlex Up to Radeon R7 250	N/A	SATA III x3 (SFF), x4 (MT)	MT: PCI, PCIe x16, PCIe x16 (wired as x4), PCIe x1 SFF: PCIe x16, PCIe x4	USB 2.0 x6, 3.0 x4
High-tier line
960	Late 2008	Intel Q45	Intel Core 2 Duo/Quad (Wolfdale)	1333 MHz	DDR2, 4	1333	8 GB	MT, DT, SFF	Chassis similar to 9xx OptiPlex however uses BTX Standard Up to Radeon 4670 or GeForce 9300 GT	N/A	SATA II x3 (SFF, DT), x4 (MT)	DT & MT: PCI x2, PCIe x16 x1, PCIe x1 x1 SFF: PCI x1, PCIe x16 x1	DT, SFF: USB 2.0 x8, MT: USB 2.0 x10
980	Early 2010	Intel Q57	Intel Core i3, i5, i7 (Lynnfield/Clarkdale)	DMI 1.0	DDR3, 4	1333	16 GB	MT, DT, SFF	Chassis similar to 9xx OptiPlex however uses BTX Standard Up to Radeon HD 4550, Quadro NVS 420 or GT 330	N/A	SATA II x3 (SFF), x4 (DT, MT)	DT & MT: PCI x2, PCIe x16 x1, PCIe x1 x1 SFF: PCI x1, PCIe x16 x1	DT, SFF: USB 2.0 x8, MT: USB 2.0 x10
990	Early 2011	Intel Q67	Intel Core i3, i5 i7 (2nd gen/Sandy Bridge)	DMI 2.0	DDR3, 4	1333	32 GB	MT, DT, SFF, USFF	Chassis similar to 9xxx OptiPlex Up to Radeon HD 6670	N/A	SATA II x2 (USFF) x3,(SFF, DT) x4 (MT)	MT & DT (DT half height): PCI, PCIe x16, PCIe x16 (wired as x4), PCIe x1 SFF (half height): PCIe x16, PCIe x16 (wired as x4); USFF: miniPCIe	USB 2.0 x10
9010	Mid 2012	Intel Q77	Intel Core i3, i5, i7, Pentium (3rd gen/Ivy Bridge)	DMI 2.0	DDR3, 4	1600	32 GB	MT, DT, SFF, USFF, All-in-one	Chassis similar to 9xxx OptiPlex Up to Radeon HD 7570 or GT 640	23" 1920×1080 on AIO Model	SATA III (Max 2) & SATA II, x2 (USFF), x3 (SFF), x4 (DT, MT)	MT & DT (DT half height): PCI, PCIe x16, PCIe x16 (wired as x4), PCIe x1 SFF (half height): PCIe x16, PCIe x16 (wired as x4); USFF: miniPCIe	MT, DT, & SFF: USB 2.0 x6, 3.0 x4 USFF: USB 2.0 x4, 3.0 x4
9020	Mid 2013	Intel Q87	Intel Core i3, i5, i7, Pentium (4th gen/Haswell)	DMI 2.0	DDR3, 4	1600	MT, SFF: 32 GB / USFF, Micro, All-in-one: 16 GB	MT, SFF, USFF, Micro, All-in-one	Chassis similar to 9xx OptiPlex DisplayPort 1.2 with a DisplayPort MST Not All (ONLY after release BLANK date and after). Up to GTX 745, R7 250 or Dual Radeon R5 240	23" 1920×1080 on AIO Model	MT: SATA III x2 & SATA II x2 SFF: SATA III x2 & SATA II x1 USFF: SATA III x2 Micro: SATA III x1 All-in-one: SATA (version unknown) x2	MT: PCI, PCIe x16, PCIe x16 (wired as x4), PCIe x1 SFF (half height): PCIe x16, PCIe x16 (wired as x4); USFF: miniPCIe	MT & SFF: USB 2.0 x6, 3.0 x4 USFF: USB 2.0 x4, 3.0 x4
9030	Mid 2014	Intel Q87	Intel Core i3, i5, i7 (4th gen/Haswell)	DMI 2.0	DDR3, 2 SODIMM	1600	16 GB	All-in-one	Displayport 1.2, HDMI in and out Up to Radeon R7 A265	23" 1920×1080 (IPS, Touch Optional)	1 SATA III 1 M.2 (Note: Needs BIOS upgrades)	—N/a	USB 2.0 x4 (3 internal), 3.0 x6
Model	Release	Chipset	CPU	FSB	Ram Type	Ram Speed	RAM Max	Chassis	Comments	Display	Storage	PCI/AGP/PCIe	USB

== Series 5 ==
Dell OptiPlex computers sold from 2015 to 2020 use cases that resembled the style used in Dell laptops of the same era. These OptiPlex machines are no longer standard ATX or MicroATX.

Form factors
Chassis	Models	Image	Height	Width	Depth	Expansion Card Slots	external bays		Internal bays	Power Supply
Chassis	Models	Image	Height	Width	Depth	Expansion Card Slots	5.25"	3.5"	Internal bays	Power Supply
MFF	7040 to 7070		18.3 cm (7.2 in)	3.5 cm (1.4 in)	17.8 cm (7.0 in)	—N/a	—N/a	—N/a	1 M.2 2280 SSD, 1 2.5" HDD	65 or 90 W Power Adapter
SFF	7040 to 7070		29.0 cm (11.4 in)	9.27 cm (3.65 in)	29.2 cm (11.5 in)	2 (low-profile)	1 (slim-line)	—N/a	1 M.2 2280 SSD, 1 3.5"/2.5" HDD	180, 200 or 240 W 80+ Bronze or Platinum (OptiPlex XE3 300 W 80+ Gold)
MT	7040 to 7070		35.05 cm (13.80 in)	15.4 cm (6.1 in)	27.4 cm (10.8 in)	4 (full-height)	2 (slim-line and full)	—N/a	1 M.2 2280 SSD, 1 3.5", 2 2.5" HDD	240 or 315 W 80+ Bronze or Platinum (OptiPlex XE3 360 W 80+ Gold)

Models
Model	Release	Chipset	CPU	FSB	Ram Type	RAM Speed	RAM Max	Chassis	Comments	Display	Storage	PCI/AGP/PCIe	USB
Entry line
3040	Late 2015	Intel H110	Intel Core i3, i5, Pentium, Celeron (6th gen/Skylake)	DMI 3.0	DDR3L, 2 (Micro: SODIMM)	1600	16 GB	MT, SFF, Micro	Gigabit Ethernet, DisplayPort 1.2, HDMI 1.4, Optional VGA Up to Radeon R7 350X	N/A	1 3.5"/2.5"	MT: PCIe x16, 3x PCIe x1, SFF: PCIe x16, PCIe x1 (Half height)	USB 2.0 x4, 3.0 x4
3046	Early 2016	Intel H110	Intel Core i3, i5, Pentium, Celeron (6th gen/Skylake)	DMI 3.0	DDR4, 2 (Micro: SODIMM)	2133	16 GB	MT, SFF, Micro	Gigabit Ethernet, DisplayPort 1.2, HDMI 1.4, Optional VGA Up to Radeon R7 350X	N/A	1 3.5"/2.5"	MT: PCIe x16, 3x PCIe x1, SFF: PCIe x16, PCIe x1 (Half height)	USB 2.0 x4, 3.0 x4
3240	Early 2016	Intel H110	Intel Core i3, i5, Pentium, Celeron (6th gen/Skylake)	DMI 3.0	DDR3L, 2 SODIMM	2133	16 GB	All-in-one	Gigabit Ethernet, DisplayPort 1.2, HDMI 1.4, Optional VGA Up to Radeon R7 A360	21.5" 1920×1080 (IPS, Touch Optional)	1 2.5", M.2 (WiFi Only)	—N/a	USB 2.0 x2, 3.0 x4
3050	Early 2017	Intel B250	Intel Core i3, i5, Pentium, Celeron (6th gen/Skylake)/(7th gen/Kaby Lake)	DMI 3.0	DDR4, 2 (Micro: SODIMM)	2400	32 GB	MT, SFF, Micro	Gigabit Ethernet, HDMI 1.4, DisplayPort 1.2 (Micro: DP 1.2 x1) Up to Radeon R5 450	N/A	MT & SFF (half height): PCIe x16, 3x PCIe x1, M.2 80 mm (Micro: M.2 30 mm (WiFi only)), M.2 80 mm		MT & SFF: 4x 3.1, 4 × 2.0 (Micro: 4x 3.1, 2x 2.0)
3050	Early 2017	Intel B250	Intel Core i3, i5, Pentium, Celeron (6th gen/Skylake)/(7th gen/Kaby Lake)	DMI 3.0	DDR4, 2 (Micro: SODIMM)	2400	32 GB	All-in-one	Gigabit Ethernet, DisplayPort 1.2, VGA/Serial, 1.0 MP 720p Webcam	19.5" IPS 1600x900 (Optional touch)	2.5" bay, Two M.2 slots	—N/a	USB 2.0 x2, 3.1 Gen 1 x4
3060	April 2018	Intel H370	Intel Core i3, i5, i7, Pentium, Celeron (8th gen/Coffee Lake)	DMI 3.0	DDR4, 2	2666	32 GB	MT, SFF, Micro	Gigabit Ethernet, HDMI 1.4, DisplayPort 1.2 Up to GT 730 or Radeon RX 550	N/A	1 3.5"/2.5", 1 M.2	MT: PCIe x16, 3x PCIe x1, SFF: PCIe x16, PCIe x1 (Half height)	MT & SFF: 4x 3.1, 4 × 2.0 (Micro: 4x 3.1, 2x 2.0)
3070	June 2019	Intel H370	Intel Core i3, i5, i7, Pentium, Celeron (9th gen/Coffee Lake Refresh)	DMI 3.0	DDR4, 2 (Micro: SODIMM)	2666	32 GB	MT, SFF, Micro	Gigabit Ethernet, HDMI 1.4, DisplayPort 1.2 Up to GT 730 or Radeon RX 550	N/A	1 3.5"/2.5", 1 M.2	MT: PCIe x16, 3x PCIe x1, SFF: PCIe x16, PCIe x1 (Half height)	MT & SFF: 4x 3.1, 4 × 2.0 (Micro: 4x 3.1, 2x 2.0)
Mainstream line
5040	Late 2015	Intel Q170	Intel Core i3, i5, i7 (6th gen/Skylake)	DMI 3.0	DDR3L, 4	1600	16 GB	MT, SFF	Gigabit Ethernet, HDMI 1.4, DisplayPort 1.2 x2 Up to Radeon R7 350X	—N/a	1 3.5"/2.5", 1 M.2	MT: 2x PCIe x16, PCIe x1, PCI, SFF: PCIe x16, PCIe x4 (Half height)	USB 2.0 x4, 3.0 x6
5050	Early 2017	Intel Q270	Intel Core i3, i5, i7 (6th gen/Skylake)/(7th gen/Kaby Lake)	DMI 3.0	DDR4, 4 (Micro: 2 SODIMM)	2400	64 GB (Micro: 32 GB)	MT, SFF, Micro	Gigabit Ethernet, HDMI 1.4, DisplayPort 1.2 x2 (Micro: DP 1.2 x1) Up to Radeon R7 450	N/A	MT & SFF (half height): PCIe x16, 3x PCIe x1, M.2 80 mm (Micro: M.2 30 mm (WiFi only)), M.2 80 mm		MT & SFF: 6 × 3.1 A, 4 × 2.0 (Micro: 6 × 3.1 A)
5250	Early 2017	Intel Q270	Intel Core i3, i5, i7 (6th gen/Skylake)/(7th gen/Kaby Lake)	DMI 3.0	DDR4, 2 SODIMM	2400	32 GB	All-in-one	Gigabit Ethernet, HDMI 1.4, DisplayPort 1.2, 2.0 MP 1080p Webcam Up to Radeon R7 M465	21.5" IPS 1920×1080 (Optional touch)	2.5" bay, Two M.2 slots	—N/a	USB 2.0 x2, 3.1 Gen 1 x4
5055	Sept 2017	AMD B350	AMD Ryzen 3, 5, 7 PRO CPU/APU (Summit Ridge / Raven Ridge) AMD PRO A6, A8, A10, A12 APU (Bristol Ridge)	PCIe 3.0	DDR4, 4	2400	64 GB	MT, SFF	Gigabit Ethernet, DisplayPort 1.2 x2 Up to Radeon R7 450 or Dual R5 430	N/A	1 3.5"/2.5", 1 M.2	SFF (half height): PCIe x16, PCIe x4, MT 2x PCIe x1, PCIe x4, PCIe x16	USB 2.0 x4, USB 3.1 Gen 1 x6
5060	April 2018	Intel Q370	Intel Core i3, i5, i7, Pentium Gold (8th gen/Coffee Lake)	DMI 3.0	DDR4, 4 (Micro: 2 SODIMM)	2666	64 GB (Micro: 32 GB)	MT, SFF, Micro	Gigabit Ethernet, DisplayPort 1.2 x2 Up to GTX 1050 or Dual Radeon RX 550	N/A	MT & SFF (half height): PCIe x16, 3x PCIe x1, M.2 80 mm, M.2 30 mm (WiFi only) (Micro: M.2 80 mm, M.2 30 mm (WiFi only))		MT & SFF: 1 × 3.1 Gen 2, 5x 3.1, 4 × 2.0 (Micro: 1 × 3.1 Gen 2, 5x 3.1)
5260	April 2018	Intel Q370	Intel Core i3, i5, i7, Pentium Gold (8th gen/Coffee Lake)	DMI 3.0	DDR4, 2 SODIMM	2666	32 GB	All-in-one	Gigabit Ethernet, DisplayPort 1.2, 2.0 MP 1080p Webcam	21.5" IPS 1920×1080 (Optional Touch)	2.5" bay, M.2 80 mm, M.2 30 mm (WiFi only)	—N/a	USB 2 × 3.1 Gen 2, 2x 3.1, 2x 2.0
5070	June 2019	Intel Q370	Intel Core i3, i5, i7, Pentium, Celeron (9th gen/Coffee Lake Refresh)	DMI 3.0	DDR4, 4 (Micro: 2 SODIMM)	2666	64 GB	MT, SFF, Micro	Gigabit Ethernet, DisplayPort 1.2 x2 Up to GTX 1050 or Dual Radeon RX 550	N/A	1 3.5"/2.5", 1 M.2	MT: 2x PCIe x16, PCIe x1, PCI, SFF: PCIe x16, PCIe x4 (Half height)	MT & SFF: 1 × 3.1 Gen 2, 5 x 3.1, 2 × 2.0 (Micro: 1 × 3.1 Gen 2, 5x 3.1)
5270	Sept 2019	Intel Q370	Intel Core i3, i5, i7, Pentium, Celeron (9th gen/Coffee Lake Refresh)	DMI 3.0	DDR4 SODIMM	2666	32 GB	All-in-one	Gigabit Ethernet, HDMI 1.4 (In & Out), DisplayPort 1.2, 2.0 MP 1080p Webcam, 802.11ax	21.5" IPS 1920×1080 (Optional touch)	2.5" bay, Two M.2 slots	—N/a	USB 2 × 3.1 Gen 2, 2x 3.1, 2x 2.0
High-tier line
7040	Late 2015	Intel Q170	Intel Core i3, i5, i7 (6th gen/Skylake)	DMI 3.0	DDR4, 4 (Micro: 2 SODIMM)	2133	64 GB (Micro: 32 GB)	MT, SFF, Micro	Gigabit Ethernet, HDMI 1.4, DisplayPort 1.2, 2.0 MP 1080p Webcam Up to Nvidia GTX 745 or Radeon R7 350X	N/A	1 3.5"/2.5", 1 M.2	MT: 2x PCIe x16, PCIe x1, PCI, SFF: PCIe x16, PCIe x4 (Half height)	USB 2.0 x4, 3.0 x6
7440	Late 2015	Intel Q170	Intel Core i3, i5, i7 (6th gen/Skylake)/(7th gen/Kaby Lake)	DMI 3.0	DDR4, 2 SODIMM	2400	32 GB	All-in-one	Gigabit Ethernet, HDMI 1.4, DisplayPort 1.2, 2.0 MP 1080p Webcam Up to Radeon R7 A370	23.8" IPS 1920×1080 (Optional 4k, touch)	2.5" bay, Two M.2 slots	—N/a	USB 2.0 x2, 3.1 Gen 1 x4
7050	Early 2017	Intel Q270	Intel Core i3, i5, i7 (6th gen/Skylake)/(7th gen/Kaby Lake)	DMI 3.0	DDR4, 4 (Micro: 2 SODIMM)	2400	64 GB (Micro: 32 GB)	MT, SFF, Micro	Gigabit Ethernet, HDMI 1.4, DisplayPort 1.2 x2 (Micro: DP 1.2 x1) Up to Radeon R7 450	N/A	MT & SFF (half height): PCIe x16, 3x PCIe x1, M.2 80 mm (Micro: M.2 30 mm (WiFi only)), M.2 80 mm		MT & SFF: 6 × 3.1 (1 C, 5 A), 4 × 2.0 (Micro: 6 × 3.1 (1 C, 5 A))
7450	Early 2017	Intel Q270	Intel Core i3, i5, i7 (6th gen/Skylake)/(7th gen/Kaby Lake)	DMI 3.0	DDR4, 2 SODIMM	2400	32 GB	All-in-one	Gigabit Ethernet, HDMI 1.4, DisplayPort 1.2, 2.0 MP 1080p Webcam Up to Radeon R7 M465X	23.8" IPS 1920×1080 (Optional 4k, touch)	2.5" bay x2, Two M.2 slots	—N/a	USB 2.0 x2, 3.1 Gen 1 x4
7060	April 2018	Intel Q370	Intel Core i3, i5, i7 (8th gen/Coffee Lake)	DMI 3.0	DDR4, 4 (Micro: 2 SODIMM)	2666	64 GB (Micro: 32 GB)	MT, SFF, Micro	Gigabit Ethernet, DisplayPort 1.2 x2 Up to GTX 1050 or Dual Radeon RX 550	N/A	MT & SFF (half height): PCIe x16, 3x PCIe x1, M.2 80 mm, M.2 30 mm (WiFi only) (Micro: M.2 80 mm, M.2 30 mm (WiFi only))		MT & SFF: 1 × 3.1 Gen 2, 5x 3.1, 4 × 2.0 (Micro: 1 × 3.1 Gen 2, 5x 3.1)
7460	April 2018	Intel Q370	Intel Core i3, i5, i7 (8th gen/Coffee Lake)	DMI 3.0	DDR4, 2 SODIMM	2666	32 GB	All-in-one	Gigabit Ethernet, HDMI 1.4 (In & Out), DisplayPort 1.2, 2.0 MP 1080p Webcam Up to GTX 1050	23.8" IPS 1920×1080 (Optional 4k, touch)	2.5" bay, M.2 80 mm, M.2 30 mm (WiFi only)	—N/a	USB 1 × 3.1 Gen 2, 5x 3.1
7760	April 2018	Intel Q370	Intel Core i3, i5, i7 (8th gen/Coffee Lake)	DMI 3.0	DDR4, 2 SODIMM	2666	32 GB	All-in-one	Gigabit Ethernet, HDMI 1.4 (In & Out), DisplayPort 1.2, 2.0 MP 1080p Webcam Up to GTX 1050	27" IPS 1920×1080, (Optional 4K, Touch)	2.5" bay, M.2 80 mm, M.2 30 mm (WiFi only)	—N/a	USB 1 × 3.1 Gen 2, 5x 3.1
7070	June 2019	Intel Q370	Intel Core i3, i5, i7, i9, (9th gen/Coffee Lake Refresh)	DMI 3.0	DDR4, 4 (Micro: 2 SODIMM)	2666	64 GB	MT, SFF, Micro	Gigabit Ethernet, DisplayPort 1.2 x2 Up to GTX 1050 or Dual Radeon RX 550	N/A	1 3.5"/2.5", 1 M.2	MT: 2x PCIe x16, PCIe x1, PCI, SFF: PCIe x16, PCIe x4 (Half height)	MT & SFF: 1 × 3.1 Gen 2, 5 x 3.1, 2 × 2.0 (Micro: 1 × 3.1 Gen 2, 5x 3.1)
7470	Sept 2019	Intel Q370	Intel Core i3, i5, i7, i9, (9th gen/Coffee Lake Refresh)	DMI 3.0	DDR4, 2 SODIMM	2666	32 GB	All-in-one	Gigabit Ethernet, HDMI 1.4 (In & Out), DisplayPort 1.2, 2.0 MP 1080p Webcam, Optional 802.11ax, Up to GTX 1050 4 GB	23.8" IPS 1920×1080 (Optional touch)	2.5" bay, Two M.2 slots	—N/a	USB 3 × 3.1 Gen 2 (1x Type C), 2x 3.1, 2x 2.0
7770	Sept 2019	Intel Q370	Intel Core i3, i5, i7, i9, (9th gen/Coffee Lake Refresh)	DMI 3.0	DDR4, 2 SODIMM	2666	32 GB	All-in-one	Gigabit Ethernet, HDMI 1.4 (In & Out), DisplayPort 1.2, 2.0 MP 1080p Webcam, Optional 802.11ax, Up to GTX 1050 4 GB	27" IPS 1920×1080, (Optional 4K, Touch)	2.5" bay, Two M.2 slots	—N/a	USB 3 × 3.1 Gen 2 (1x Type C), 2x 3.1, 2x 2.0
7070 Ultra	Sept 2019	—N/a	Intel Core i3, i5, i7, (8th gen/Whiskey Lake 25 W)	DMI 3.0	DDR4, 2 SODIMM	2400	64 GB	Ultra	Gigabit Ethernet, DisplayPort over USB C, Attaches inside Monitor stand	—N/a	1 2230 M.2	—N/a	1x USB 3.0, 4x USB 3.1 Gen 2
Model	Release	Chipset	CPU	FSB	Ram Type	Ram Speed	RAM Max	Chassis	Comments	Display	Storage	PCI/AGP/PCIe	USB

=== Windows 11 support ===
Windows 11 requires TPM 2.0 and an 8th generation Intel or newer processor. Some models in Series 5 between 2015 and 2019 shipped with TPM 1.2, but are capable of meeting these requirements with a firmware upgrade to TPM 2.0 and the appropriate minimum CPU.

Potential models that may be able to support Windows 11 include: Intel H370 chipset (3060 / 3070), Intel Q370 chipset (5060 / 5070, 5260 / 5270, 7060 / 7070 / 7070 Ultra, 7460 / 7470, 7760 / 7770).

== Series 6 ==
The Dell OptiPlex chassis now follows the Pro 2 chassis introduced with the OptiPlex 7071 and now also on the 3080, 5080 and 7080 models. Up to a 500 W 92% 80+ Platinum PSU and support for Nvidia RTX Graphics Cards. All Models including All-in-ones offer Wi-Fi 6 Options and all Desktop models offer a Serial Port Adapter, which can be expanded with a variety of ports including; Serial ports, VGA, DisplayPorts, HDMI, and USB Type-C alt DisplayPorts. OptiPlex offers Energy Star 8.0 configurations, as well as EPEAT Silver and Gold configurations to its customers.

Form factors
Chassis	Models	Height	Width	Depth	Expansion Card Slots	External Bays	Internal Bays	Power Supply
MFF	7080 - Current	18.2 cm (7.2 in)	3.6 cm (1.4 in)	17.856 cm (7.030 in)	1 (low-profile on 7000 series only)	—N/a	2 M.2 2280 SSD, 1 2.5" HDD	90, 130 or 180 W Power Adapter
SFF	7080 - Current	29.0 cm (11.4 in)	9.26 cm (3.65 in)	29.28 cm (11.53 in)	2 (low-profile)	1 (slim-line)	2 M.2 2280 SSD, 1 3.5"/2.5" HDD	200 W 80+ Bronze or Platinum
MTE	7080 - Current	32.43 cm (12.77 in)	15.4 cm (6.06 in)	29.22 cm (11.5 in)	4 (full-height)	1 (slim-line)	2 M.2 2280 SSD, 2 3.5", 2 2.5" HDD	260 W 80+ Bronze / 260, 360 or 500 W 80+ Platinum
MTP	7080 - Current	36.7 cm (14.45 in)	16.9 cm (6.65 in)	30 cm (11.84 in)	4 (full-height)	1 (slim-line)	2 M.2 2280 SSD, 2 3.5", 2 2.5" HDD	260 W 80+ Bronze / 260, 360 or 500 W 80+ Platinum
AIO	AiO 3280	32.94 cm (12.96 in)	49.79 cm (19.6 in)	5.45 cm (2.14 in)	N/A	N/A	Dual M.2 2230/2280 SSDs (class 35, 40) and one 2.5-inch HDD	Power Adapter
AIO	AiO 5480	34.4 cm (13.54 in)	54.02 cm (21.26 in)	5.28 cm (2.07 in)	N/A	N/A	Dual M.2 2230/2280 SSDs (class 35, 40) and one 2.5-inch HDD	Internal 155 W 80+ Bronze or 220 W 80+ Platinum (for discrete graphics options)
AIO	AiO 7480	34.4 cm (13.54 in)	54.02 cm (21.26 in)	5.28 cm (2.07 in)	N/A	N/A	Dual M.2 2230/2280 SSDs (class 35, 40) and one 2.5-inch HDD	220 W 80+ Platinum
AIO	AiO 7780	38.9 cm (15.31 in)	61.4 cm (24.17 in)	5.8 cm (2.28 in)	N/A	N/A	Dual M.2 2230/2280 SSDs (class 35, 40) and one 2.5-inch HDD	220 W 80+ Platinum
UFF	7070 - Current	1.97 cm (0.78 in)	9.61 cm (3.78 in)	25.62 cm (10.09 in)	N/A	N/A	M.2 2230 SSD (class 35), and one 2.5-inch SATA SSD/HDD	Power Provided by stand

Models
Model	Release	Chipset	CPU	FSB	Ram Type	Ram Speed	RAM Max	Chassis	Comments	Display	Storage	PCI/AGP/PCIe	USB
Entry line
3080	May 2020	Intel B460	Intel Core i3, i5, Pentium (10th gen/Comet lake)	DMI 3.0	DDR4, 2 (Micro: 2 SODIMM)	2666	64 GB	MT, SFF, Micro	Up to AMD Radeon RX 640	—N/a	1 3.5", 1 M.2	MT: 1x PCIe x16, 2x PCIe x1, SFF: PCIe x16, PCIe x1 (Half height)	4x USB 3.2 Gen 1, 4x 2.0
3280	May 2020	Intel B460	Intel Core i3, i5, Pentium (10th gen/Comet lake)	DMI 3.0	DDR4, 2 SODIMM	2666	64 GB	All-in-one	Gigabit Ethernet, DisplayPort 1.4	21.5" 1920×1080 (72% NTSC, 250 Nits, IPS, Touch Optional)	1 2.5", 1 M.2	—N/a	4x USB 3.2 Gen 1 (1x Type C), 2x 2.0
3090	Jan 2021	N/A	Intel Core i3, i5 (11th gen/Tiger lake)	DMI 3.0	DDR4, 2 SODIMM	3200	64 GB	Ultra	Realtek RTL8111HS NIC	N/A	1 2230 PCIe Gen 4 NVMe	N/A	5x USB 3.2 Gen 2 (1x Type C)
3090	Oct 2021	Intel Q470	Intel Core i3, i5, Pentium (10th gen/Comet lake)	DMI 3.0	DDR4, 2 (Micro: 2 SODIMM)	2666	64 GB	MT, SFF, Micro	2x DisplayPort 1.4, Intel I219-LM NIC, Up to AMD Radeon RX 640	N/A	1 2230 PCIe Gen 3 NVMe	MT: 1x PCIe x16, 3x PCIe x1, SFF: PCIe x16, PCIe x4 (Half height)	4x USB 2.0 4x USB 3.2 Gen 1, Micro: 5x USB 3.2 Gen 1
3000	2022	Intel B660	Intel Core i3, i5, Pentium (12th gen)	DMI 3.0	DDR4, 2 (Micro: 2 SODIMM 260 pin)	3200	64 GB	MT, SFF, Micro	DisplayPort 1.4, HDMI 1.4b	N/A	1x 2230 PCIe Gen 3 NVMe up to Gen 4	MT: 1x PCIe x16, 3x PCIe x1, SFF: PCIe x16, PCIe x4 (Half height)	4x USB 2.0 4x USB 3.2 Gen 1, Micro: 5x USB 3.2 Gen 1
Mainstream line
5080	May 2020	Intel Q470	Intel Core i3, i5, i7, Pentium (10th gen/Comet lake)	DMI 3.0	DDR4, 4 (Micro: 2 SODIMM)	2666/2933	128 GB (Micro: 64 GB)	MT, SFF, Micro	Up to GTX 1660 Super	—N/a	3.5", 2 2.5" bay, M.2 80 mm, M.2 30 mm (WiFi only)	MT: 2x PCIe x16, PCIe x1, PCI, SFF: PCIe x16, PCIe x4 (Half height)	MT & SFF: 1 × 3.2 Gen 2 Type C, 5 × 3.2 Gen 1, 4x 2.0
5480	May 2020	Intel Q470	Intel Core i3, i5, i7, Pentium (10th gen/Comet lake)	DMI 3.0	DDR4, 2 SODIMM	2666/2933	64 GB	All-in-one	GTX 1050 K1, 3 GB Optional, DisplayPort 1.4	23.8" 1920×1080 (72% NTSC, 250 Nits, IPS, Touch Optional)	2.5" bay, 2 M.2 80 mm, M.2 30 mm (WiFi only)	—N/a	4x USB 3.2 Gen 1 (1x Type C), 2x 2.0
5090	June 2021	Intel Q570	Intel Core i3, i5, i7, (11th gen/Rocket lake)	DMI 3.0 x8	DDR4, 2 SODIMM	3200	128 GB	MT, SFF, Micro	Up to GTX 1660 Super	—N/a	3.5", 2 2.5" bay, 2 M.2 80 mm PCIe 4 NVMe, M.2 30 mm (WiFi only)	MT: 2x PCIe x16, PCIe x1, PCI, SFF: PCIe x16, PCIe x4 (Half height)	MT & SFF: 1 × 3.2 Gen 2 Type C, 5 × 3.2 Gen 1, 4x 2.0
5490	Aug 2021	Intel Q570	Intel Core i3, i5, i7, (11th gen/Rocket lake)	DMI 3.0 x8	DDR4, 2 SODIMM	3200	64 GB	All-in-one	Up to GTX 1650 4 GB	23.8" 1920×1080 (72% NTSC, 250 Nits, IPS, Touch Optional)	2.5" bay, 2 M.2 80 mm, M.2 30 mm (WiFi only)	N/A	4x USB 3.2 Gen 2 (1x Type C), 2x 2.0
5000	March 2022	Intel Q670	Intel Core i3, i5, i7, (12th gen/Alder lake)	DMI 3.0 x8	DDR4, 4 DIMM (Micro: 2 SODIMM)	3200	128 GB	MT, SFF, Micro	Up to AMD RX 640	—N/a	3.5", 2 2.5" bay, 2 M.2 80 mm PCIe 4 NVMe, M.2 30 mm (WiFi only)	MT: 2x PCIe x16, PCIe x1, PCI, SFF: PCIe x16, PCIe x4 (Half height)	MT & SFF: 1 × 3.2 Gen 2 Type C, 5 × 3.2 Gen 1, 4x 2.0
High-tier line
7071	Sept 2019	Intel Q370	Intel Core i3, i5, i7, i9, (9th gen/Coffee Lake Refresh)	DMI 3.0	DDR4, 4	2666	128 GB	Pro 2 (MT)	Up to RTX 2080, 9700k and 9900k K Sku available	—N/a	2 3.5", 2 2.5", 1 M.2	PCIe x16, PCIe x16 (Wired as x4), PCI PCI x1	4x USB 2.0, 5x USB 3.0, 1x USB 3.1 Gen 2 Type C
7080	May 2020	Intel Q470	Intel Core i3, i5, i7, i9 (10th gen/Comet lake)	DMI 3.0	DDR4, 4 (Micro: 2 SODIMM)	2666/2933	128 GB (Micro: 64 GB)	MT, SFF, Micro Pro 2	Up to RTX 2070 Super and i9-10900K K Sku on MT, Up to AMD RX 640 on MFF	—N/a	3.5", 2 2.5" bay, 2 M.2 80 mm, M.2 30 mm (WiFi only)	MT: 2x PCIe x16, PCIe x1, PCI, SFF: PCIe x16, PCIe x4 (Half height)	MT & SFF: 3 × 3.2 Gen 2 (1x Type C, 2x Type A) 3 × 3.2 Gen 1, 4 × 2.0 (USB 3.1 Gen 2/DP Optional)
7480	May 2020	Intel Q470	Intel Core i3, i5, i7, i9 (10th gen/Comet lake)	DMI 3.0	DDR4, 2 SODIMM	2666/2933	64 GB	All-in-one	HDMI 1.4 (In & Out), DisplayPort 1.4, 2.0 MP 1080p Webcam, Up to GTX 1650 4 GB	23.8" 1920×1080 (72% NTSC, 250 Nits, IPS, Touch Optional)	2.5" bay, 2 M.2 80 mm, M.2 30 mm (WiFi only)	—N/a	5x USB 3.2 Gen 2 (1x Type C) 1 × 3.2 Gen 1
7780	May 2020	Intel Q470	Intel Core i3, i5, i7, i9 (10th gen/Comet lake)	DMI 3.0	DDR4, 2 SODIMM	2666/2933	64 GB	All-in-one	HDMI 1.4 (In & Out), DisplayPort 1.4, 2.0 MP 1080p Webcam, Up to GTX 1650 4 GB	27" IPS 1920×1080, (Optional 4K, Touch)	2.5" bay, 2 M.2 80 mm, M.2 30 mm (WiFi only)	—N/a	5x USB 3.2 Gen 2 (1x Type C) 1 × 3.2 Gen 1
7090	Jan 2021	N/A	Intel Core i3, i5, i7 (11th gen/Tiger lake)	DMI 3.0	DDR4, 2 SODIMM	3200	64 GB	Ultra	DisplayPort 1.4 and Thunderbolt 4.0 over USB Type C Connector	N/A	1 2230 M.2 PCIe 4 NVMe	N/A	1x USB 4, 4x USB 3.2 Gen 2 (1x Type C)
7090	June 2021	Intel Q570	Intel Core i3, i5, i7, i9 (11th gen/Rocket lake)	DMI 3.0 x8	DDR4, 2 SODIMM	3200	128 GB	MT, SFF, Micro Pro 2	Up to RTX 3070 Super and i9-11900K K Sku on MT, Up to AMD RX 640 on MFF	N/A	3.5", 2 2.5" bay, 2 M.2 80 mm PCIe 4 NVMe, M.2 30 mm (WiFi only)	MT: 2x PCIe x16, PCIe x1, PCI, SFF: PCIe x16, PCIe x4 (Half height)	MT & SFF: 4x USB 2.0, 3 × 3.2 Gen 1, 2 × 3.2 Gen 2, 1 × 3.2 Gen 2x2 (Type C)(USB 3.1 Gen 2/DP Optional)
7490	Aug 2021	Intel Q570	Intel Core i3, i5, i7, i9 (11th gen/Rocket lake)	DMI 3.0 x8	DDR4, 2 SODIMM	3200	64 GB	All-in-one	Up to GTX 1650 Ti	23.8" 1920×1080 (72% NTSC, 250 Nits, IPS, Touch Optional)	2.5" bay, 2 M.2 80 mm, M.2 30 mm (WiFi only)	N/A	4x USB 3.2 Gen 2, 1x USB 3.2 Gen1, 1x USB 3.2 2x2 Type C
7000	March 2022	Intel Q670	Intel Core i3, i5, i7, i9 (12th gen/Alder Lake)	DMI 4.0	SFF: DDR4, 4, MT: DDR5, 4	DDR4 3200 / DDR5 4400	128 GB	MT, SFF	3x DisplayPort, Up to RTX 3070 8 GB	—N/a	1 3.5"/2 2.5", 1 M.2	MT: 1x PCIe x16 4.0, 1x PCIe x4 3.0, 1x PCIe x1, 1x PCI, SFF: 1x PCIe 4.0 x16, 1x PCIe 3.0 x4	MT & SFF: 1 × 3.2 Gen 2x2 (Type C), 2 × 3.2 Gen 2, 2x USB 3.2 Gen 2, 4x 2.0
Model	Release	Chipset	CPU	FSB	Ram Type	Ram Speed	RAM Max	Chassis	Comments	Display	Storage	PCI/AGP/PCIe	USB

New models need update (Still series 6 / Pro 2 ?)

2023 - 7010

2024 - 7020

2025 - Dell Pro Micro / Dell Pro Micro Plus

== OptiPlex XE ==
The Dell OptiPlex XE is a special version designed for equipment manufacturer, retail/point-of-sale (POS) systems. They are based on the standard OptiPlex models with added features; such as a higher heat threshold, MIL-STD 810G testing and powered USB/Serial.

XE line
Model	Release	Chipset	CPU	FSB	Ram Type	RAM Speed	RAM Max	Chassis	Comments	Display	Storage	PCI/AGP/PCIe	USB
XE	Early 2010	Intel Q45	Intel Core 2 Duo/Quad (Wolfdale)	1333 MHz	DDR3, 4	1333	8 GB	DT, SFF	Intel AMT features disabled, Dual NICs, Powered USB 24v. Optional external power buttons and dust filter. (Requires Bios updates) Based on OptiPlex 960	—N/a	DT and SFF: 1x 3.5" SATA	DT: PCI x2, PCIe x16 x1, PCIe x1 x1 SFF: PCI x1, PCIe x16 x1	24v USB, 6x USB 2.0
XE2	Mid 2013	Intel Q87	Intel Core i3, i5, i7, Pentium (4th gen/Haswell)(65 W S series Processors only)	DMI 2.0	DDR3, 4	1600	32 GB	MT, SFF	Based on OptiPlex 9020 with black front bezel.	—N/a	MT: 2x 3.5", SFF: 1 × 3.5 SATA III	MT: PCI, PCIe x16, PCIe x16 (wired as x4), PCIe x1 SFF (half height): PCIe x16, PCIe x16 (wired as x4)	MT & SFF: USB 2.0 x6, 3.0 x4
XE3	Mid 2018	Intel Q370	Intel Core i3, i5, i7 (8th gen/Coffee Lake)	DMI 3.0	DDR4, 4	2666	64 GB	MT, SFF	Based on OptiPlex 7060	—N/a	1 3.5"/2.5", 1 M.2	MT & SFF (half height): PCIe x16, 3x PCIe x1, M.2 80 mm, M.2 30 mm (WiFi only)	MT & SFF: 1 × 3.1 Gen 2, 5x 3.1, 4x
XE4	March 2022	Intel Q670	Intel Core i3, i5, i7, i9 (12th gen/Alder Lake)	DMI 4.0	SFF: DDR4, 4, MT: DDR5, 4	DDR4 3200 / DDR5 4400	128 GB	MT, SFF	Based on OptiPlex 7000	—N/a	1 3.5"/2 2.5", 1 M.2	MT: 1x PCIe x16 4.0, 1x PCIe x4 3.0, 1x PCIe x1, 1x PCI, SFF: 1x PCIe 4.0 x16, 1x PCIe 3.0 x4	MT & SFF: 1 × 3.2 Gen 2x2 (Type C), 2 × 3.2 Gen 2, 2x USB 3.2 Gen 2, 4x 2.0
