= Rocket Lake =

Intel microprocessor released in 2021

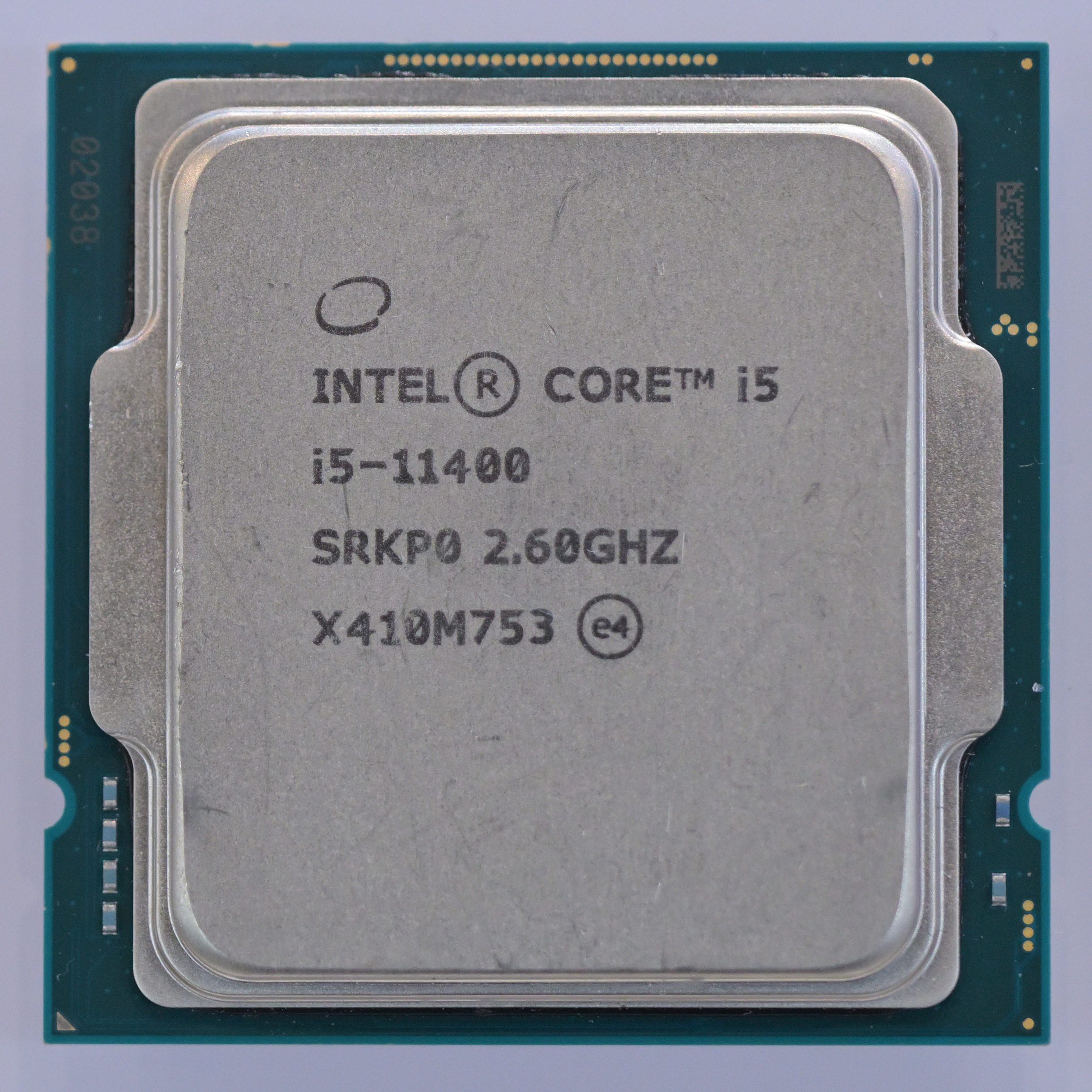
- Intel Core i5-11400

General information
- Launched: March 30, 2021; 5 years ago
- Discontinued: February 23, 2024; 2 years ago
- Product code: 80708

Performance
- Max. CPU clock rate: 1.3 GHz to 5.3 GHz

Physical specifications
- Cores: Up to 8
- Socket: LGA 1200

Cache
- L1 cache: 80 KB per core: 32 KB instructions; 48 KB data
- L2 cache: 512 KB per core
- L3 cache: 2 MB per core

Architecture and classification
- Technology node: Intel 14 nm++
- Microarchitecture: Cypress Cove
- Instruction set: x86
- Instructions: x86-16, IA-32, x86-64
- Extensions: AES-NI, CLMUL, RDRAND, SHA, TXT; MMX, SSE, SSE2, SSE3, SSSE3, SSE4.1, SSE4.2; AVX, AVX2, AVX-512, FMA3; VT-x, VT-d

Products, models, variants
- Product code name: RKL
- Brand name: Core; Xeon

History
- Predecessor: Comet Lake
- Successors: Alder Lake (desktops); Raptor Lake (low-end servers)

Support status
- Legacy support for iGPU

Rocket Lake is Intel's codename for its 11th-generation Core-branded microprocessors. Released on March 30, 2021, it is based on the new Cypress Cove microarchitecture, a variant of Sunny Cove (used by Intel's Ice Lake mobile processors) backported to Intel's 14 nm process node. Rocket Lake cores contain significantly more transistors than Skylake-derived Comet Lake cores.

Rocket Lake features the same LGA 1200 socket and 400-series chipset compatibility as Comet Lake, except H410 and B460 chipsets. It is accompanied by new 500-series chipsets as well. Rocket Lake has up to eight cores, down from 10 cores for Comet Lake. It features Intel Xe graphics, and PCIe 4.0 support. Only a single M.2 drive is supported in PCIe 4.0 mode, while all the rest are wired via PCIe 3.0.

Intel officially launched the Rocket Lake desktop family on March 16, 2021, with sales commencing on March 30. The 11th generation Core i3, as well as Rocket Lake-based Pentium Gold and Celeron CPUs were not included along with the higher-end models; instead, Intel launched refreshed models for Comet Lake Core i3 and Pentium Gold CPUs. These processors have the same characteristics as their original parts, albeit with a 100 MHz higher frequency and the last digit of their model numbers changing from zero to five. Intel also released Tiger Lake processors as part of the 11th generation lineup in the desktop/NUC and tablet market. Such processors have the new B suffix in the model names.

== Features ==
=== CPU ===
Rocket Lake die from an i5-11400

- Intel Cypress Cove CPU cores
- Up to 19% claimed increase in IPC (instructions-per-clock)
- DL Boost (low-precision arithmetic for Deep Learning) and AVX-512 instructions
- Compared to its predecessors, SGX instruction set extensions are removed

=== GPU ===
- Intel Xe-LP ("Gen12") GPU with up to 32 execution units
- Fixed-function hardware for decoding HEVC 12-bit, 4:2:2/4:4:4; VP9 12-bit 4:4:4 and AV1 8K 10-bit 4:2:0
- DisplayPort 1.4a with Display Stream Compression; HDMI 2.0b
- Support for a single 8K 12-bit HDR display or two 4K 10-bit HDR displays
- Hardware accelerated Dolby Vision
- Sampler Feedback support
- Dual Queue Support
- Variable Rate Shading
- Integer- and nearest neighbor image scaling
- GPUs on desktop CPUs support 5K 60 Hz

=== I/O ===
- Up to 20 CPU lanes of PCI Express 4.0
- DDR4-3200 memory support
- USB 3.2 Gen 2×2
- Optional USB4 / Thunderbolt 4 when paired with Intel JHL8540 Thunderbolt 4 Controller
- DMI 3.0 x8 link with Intel 500 Series Chipsets

== List of 11th generation Rocket Lake processors ==
=== Rocket Lake-S (Desktop processors) ===
- All CPUs listed below support DDR4-3200 natively. The Core i9 K/KF processors support a 1:1 ratio of DRAM to memory controller by specification at DDR4-3200, whereas the Core i9 non K/KF and all other CPUs listed below support a 2:1 ratio of DRAM to memory controller at DDR4-3200 and a 1:1 ratio at DDR4-2933.
- All CPUs support up to 128 GB of RAM in dual channel mode
- Core i9 CPUs (except 11900T) support Intel Thermal Velocity Boost technology

Processor branding	Model	Cores (Threads)	Clock rate (GHz)					GPU		Smart Cache (L3)	TDP	Price (USD) (Note: Price is Recommended Customer Price (RCP) at launch. RCP is the trade price that processors are sold by Intel to retailers and OEMs. Actual MSRP for consumers is higher.)
Processor branding	Model	Cores (Threads)	Base	Turbo Boost				Model	Max clock rate (GHz)	Smart Cache (L3)	TDP	Price (USD)
Processor branding	Model	Cores (Threads)	Base	All-Core	2.0	3.0	TVB	Model	Max clock rate (GHz)	Smart Cache (L3)	TDP	Price (USD)
Core i9	11900K	8 (16)	3.5	4.8	5.1	5.2	5.3	UHD 750	1.3	16 MB	125 W	$539
Core i9	11900KF	8 (16)	3.5	4.8	5.1	5.2	5.3	—N/a		16 MB	125 W	$513
Core i9	11900	8 (16)	2.5	4.7	5.0	5.1	5.2	UHD 750	1.3	16 MB	65 W	$439
Core i9	11900F	8 (16)	2.5	4.7	5.0	5.1	5.2	—N/a		16 MB	65 W	$422
Core i9	11900T	8 (16)	1.5	3.7	4.8	4.9	—N/a	UHD 750	1.3	16 MB	35 W	$439
Core i7	11700K	8 (16)	3.6	4.6	4.9	5.0	—N/a	UHD 750	1.3	16 MB	125 W	$399
Core i7	11700KF	8 (16)	3.6	4.6	4.9	5.0	—N/a	—N/a		16 MB	125 W	$374
Core i7	11700	8 (16)	2.5	4.4	4.8	4.9	—N/a	UHD 750	1.3	16 MB	65 W	$323
Core i7	11700F	8 (16)	2.5	4.4	4.8	4.9	—N/a	—N/a		16 MB	65 W	$298
Core i7	11700T	8 (16)	1.4	3.6	4.5	4.6	—N/a	UHD 750	1.3	16 MB	35 W	$323
Core i5	11600K	6 (12)	3.9	4.6	4.9	—N/a	—N/a	UHD 750	1.3	12 MB	125 W	$262
Core i5	11600KF	6 (12)	3.9	4.6	4.9	—N/a	—N/a	—N/a		12 MB	125 W	$237
Core i5	11600	6 (12)	2.8	4.3	4.8	—N/a	—N/a	UHD 750	1.3	12 MB	65 W	$213
Core i5	11600T	6 (12)	1.7	3.5	4.1	—N/a	—N/a	UHD 750	1.3	12 MB	35 W	$213
Core i5	11500	6 (12)	2.7	4.2	4.6	—N/a	—N/a	UHD 750	1.3	12 MB	65 W	$192
Core i5	11500T	6 (12)	1.5	3.4	3.9	—N/a	—N/a	UHD 750	1.2	12 MB	35 W	$192
Core i5	11400	6 (12)	2.6	4.2	4.4	—N/a	—N/a	UHD 730	1.3	12 MB	65 W	$182
Core i5	11400F	6 (12)	2.6	4.2	4.4	—N/a	—N/a	—N/a		12 MB	65 W	$157
Core i5	11400T	6 (12)	1.3	3.3	3.7	—N/a	—N/a	UHD 730	1.2	12 MB	35 W	$182

=== Workstation processors ===
- These CPUs support UDIMM ECC memory and require Intel W480 or W580 chipset
- Support up to 128 GB of DDR4-3200 RAM in dual channel mode

Processor branding	Model	Cores (Threads)	Clock rate (GHz)		GPU		Smart cache	TDP	Price (USD)
Processor branding	Model	Cores (Threads)	Base	Turbo	Model	Max clock rate (GHz)	Smart cache	TDP	Price (USD)
Xeon W	1390P	8 (16)	3.5	5.3	UHD P750	1.3	16 MB	125 W	$539
Xeon W	1390	8 (16)	2.8	5.2	UHD P750	1.3	16 MB	80 W	$494
Xeon W	1390T	8 (16)	1.5	4.9	UHD P750	1.3	16 MB	35 W	$494
Xeon W	1370P	8 (16)	3.6	5.2	UHD P750	1.3	16 MB	125 W	$428
Xeon W	1370	8 (16)	2.9	5.1	UHD P750	1.3	16 MB	80 W	$362
Xeon W	1350P	6 (12)	4.0	5.1	UHD P750	1.3	12 MB	125 W	$311
Xeon W	1350	6 (12)	3.3	5.0	UHD P750	1.3	12 MB	80 W	$255

=== Server processors ===
- CPUs support ECC memory and require Intel C252 or C256 chipset
- Support up to 128 GB of DDR4-3200 RAM in dual channel mode

Processor branding	Model	Cores (Threads)	Clock rate (GHz)		GPU		Smart cache	TDP	Price (USD)
Processor branding	Model	Cores (Threads)	Base	Turbo	Model	Max clock rate (GHz)	Smart cache	TDP	Price (USD)
Xeon E	2388G	8 (16)	3.2	5.1	UHD P750	1.3	16 MB	95 W	$539
Xeon E	2378G	8 (16)	2.8	5.1	UHD P750	1.3	16 MB	80 W	$494
Xeon E	2378	8 (16)	2.6	4.8	—N/a		16 MB	65 W	$362
Xeon E	2386G	6 (12)	3.5	5.1	UHD P750	1.3	12 MB	95 W	$450
Xeon E	2356G	6 (12)	3.2	5.0	UHD P750	1.3	12 MB	80 W	$311
Xeon E	2336	6 (12)	2.9	4.8	—N/a		12 MB	65 W	$284
Xeon E	2374G	4 (8)	3.7	5.0	UHD P750	1.3	8 MB	80 W	$334
Xeon E	2334	4 (8)	3.4	4.8	—N/a		8 MB	65 W	$250
Xeon E	2324G	4 (4)	3.1	4.6	UHD P750	1.3	8 MB	65 W	$209
Xeon E	2314	4 (4)	2.8	4.5	—N/a		8 MB	65 W	$182

== See also ==
- List of Intel CPU microarchitectures
- Intel Core

Atom (ULV)		Node name	Pentium/Core						
Microarch.	Step	Node name	Microarch.	Step					
		600 nm	P6	Pentium Pro (133 MHz)					
		500 nm	P6	Pentium Pro (150 MHz)					
		350 nm	P6	Pentium Pro (166–200 MHz)					
		350 nm	P6	Klamath					
		250 nm	P6	Deschutes					
		250 nm	P6	Katmai	NetBurst				
		180 nm	P6	Coppermine	Willamette				
		130 nm	P6	Tualatin	Northwood				
		130 nm	Pentium M	Banias	Northwood		NetBurst(HT)		NetBurst(×2)
		90 nm	Pentium M	Dothan	Prescott	⇨	Prescott‑2M	⇨	Smithfield
		90 nm	Pentium M	Dothan	~~Tejas~~	→	⇩	→	~~Cedarmill (Tejas)~~
		65 nm	Pentium M	Yonah	~~Nehalem (NetBurst)~~		Cedar Mill	⇨	Presler
		65 nm	Core	Merom	4 cores on mainstream desktop, DDR3 introduced				
Bonnell	Bonnell	45 nm	Core	Penryn					
Bonnell	Bonnell	45 nm	Nehalem	Nehalem	HT reintroduced, integrated MC, PCH; L3-cache introduced, 256 KB L2-cache/core				
Bonnell	Saltwell	32 nm	Nehalem	Westmere	Introduced GPU on same package and AES-NI				
Bonnell	Saltwell	32 nm	Sandy Bridge	Sandy Bridge	On-die ring bus, no more non-UEFI motherboards				
Silvermont	Silvermont	22 nm	Sandy Bridge	Ivy Bridge					
Silvermont	Silvermont	22 nm	Haswell	Haswell	Fully integrated voltage regulator				
Silvermont	Airmont	14 nm	Haswell	Broadwell					
Silvermont	Airmont	14 nm	Skylake	Skylake	DDR4 introduced on mainstream desktop				
Goldmont		14 nm	Skylake	Kaby Lake					
Goldmont		14 nm	Skylake	Coffee Lake	6 cores on mainstream desktop				
Goldmont		14 nm	Skylake	Amber Lake	Mobile-only				
Goldmont Plus		14 nm	Skylake	Whiskey Lake	Mobile-only				
Goldmont Plus		14 nm	Skylake	Coffee Lake Refresh	8 cores on mainstream desktop				
Goldmont Plus		14 nm	Skylake	Comet Lake	10 cores on mainstream desktop				
Goldmont Plus		14 nm	Sunny Cove	Cypress Cove (Rocket Lake)	Backported Sunny Cove microarchitecture for 14 nm				
Tremont		10 nm	Skylake	Palm Cove (Cannon Lake)	Mobile-only				
Tremont		10 nm	Sunny Cove	Sunny Cove (Ice Lake)	512 KB L2-cache/core				
Tremont		10 nm	Sunny Cove	Willow Cove (Tiger Lake)	X^{e} graphics engine				
Gracemont		Intel 7 (10 nm ESF)	Golden Cove	Golden Cove (Alder Lake)	Hybrid, DDR5, PCIe 5.0				
Gracemont		Intel 7 (10 nm ESF)	Golden Cove	Raptor Cove (Raptor Lake)					
Crestmont		Intel 4	Redwood Cove	Meteor Lake	Mobile-only; NPU, chiplet architecture				
Crestmont		Intel 3	Redwood Cove	Arrow Lake-U					
Skymont		TSMC N3B	Lion Cove	Lunar Lake	Low power mobile only (9–30 W)				
Skymont		TSMC N3B	Lion Cove	Arrow Lake					
Darkmont		Intel 18A	Cougar Cove	Panther Lake					
Arctic Wolf		Intel 18A and/or TSMC N2P	Coyote Cove	Nova Lake					
