= LGA 1151 =

Intel microprocessor compatible socket

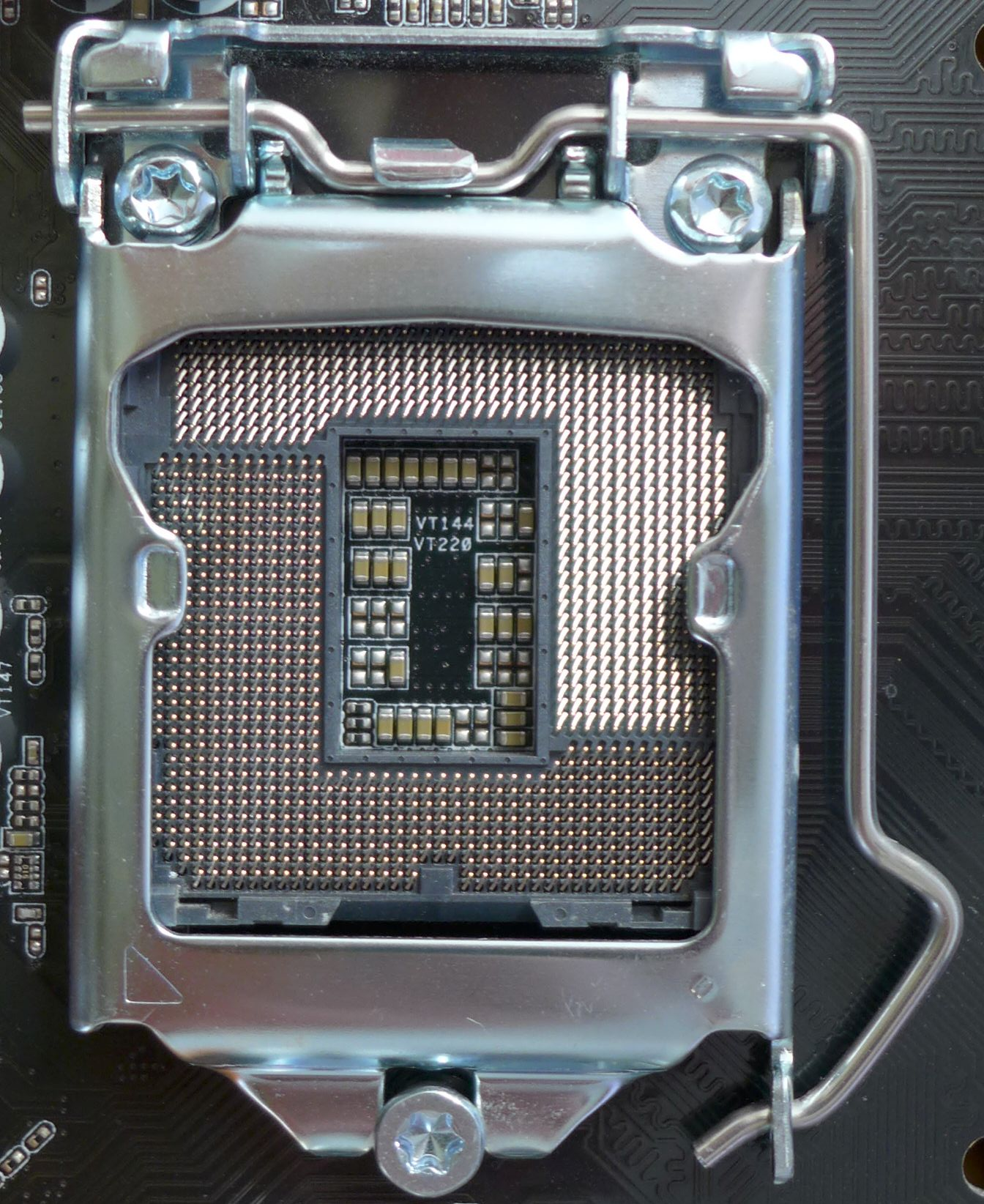
- Release date: September 1, 2015
- Designed by: Intel
- Manufactured by: Lotes
- Type: LGA-ZIF
- Chip form factors: Flip-chip
- Contacts: 1151
- FSB protocol: PCI Express
- Processor dimensions: 37.5 × 37.5 mm 1,406.25 mm²
- Processors: Skylake (2.00 - 4.00 GHz) Kaby Lake (2.40 - 4.20 GHz) Coffee Lake (1.70 - 4.00 GHz)
- Predecessor: LGA 1150
- Successor: LGA 1200
- Memory support: DDR3; DDR3L; DDR4
- This article is part of the CPU socket series

LGA 1151, also known as Socket H4, is a type of zero insertion force flip-chip land grid array (LGA) socket for Intel desktop processors which comes in two distinct versions: the first revision which supports both Intel's Skylake and Kaby Lake CPUs, and the second revision which supports Coffee Lake CPUs exclusively.

LGA 1151 is designed as a replacement for the LGA 1150 (known as Socket H3). LGA 1151 has 1151 protruding pins to make contact with the pads on the processor. The Fully Integrated Voltage Regulator, i.e. a voltage regulator which integrated on the CPU's die, introduced with Haswell and Broadwell, has again been moved to the motherboard.

It is the successor of LGA 1150 and was itself succeeded by LGA 1200 in 2020. Alongside LGA 2066, it is the last Intel socket to support Windows 7, Windows Server 2008 R2, Windows 8, Windows Server 2012, Windows 8.1 and Windows Server 2012 R2 and the earliest Intel socket to officially support all versions of Windows 11.

Most motherboards for the first revision of the socket support solely DDR4 memory, a lesser number support DDR3(L) memory, and the least number have slots for both DDR4 or DDR3(L) but only one memory type can be installed. Some have UniDIMM support, enabling either type of memory to be placed in the same DIMM, rather than having separate DDR3 and DDR4 DIMMs. The second revision socket motherboards support only DDR4 memory.

Skylake, Kaby Lake, and Coffee Lake chipsets support VT-d, Intel Rapid Storage Technology, Intel Clear Video Technology, and Intel Wireless Display Technology (an appropriate CPU is required). Most motherboards with the LGA 1151 socket support varying video outputs (DVI, HDMI 1.4 or DisplayPort 1.2 – depending on the model). VGA output is optional since Intel dropped support for this video interface starting with Skylake. HDMI 2.0 (4K@60 Hz) is only supported on motherboards equipped with Intel's Alpine Ridge Thunderbolt controller.

Skylake, Kaby Lake, and Coffee Lake chipsets do not support the legacy conventional PCI interface; however, motherboard vendors may implement it using external chips.

== Heatsink ==
The 4 holes for fastening the heatsink to the motherboard are placed in a square with a lateral length of 75 mm for Intel's sockets LGA 1156, LGA 1155, LGA 1150, LGA 1151 and LGA 1200. Cooling solutions should therefore be interchangeable.

== LGA 1151 revision 1 ==
=== DDR3 memory support ===
Intel officially states that Skylake's and Kaby Lake's integrated memory controllers (IMC) support DDR3L memory modules only rated at 1.35 V and DDR4 at 1.2 V, which led to the speculation that higher voltages of DDR3 modules could damage or destroy the IMC and processor. Meanwhile, ASRock, Gigabyte, and Asus guarantee that their Skylake and Kaby Lake DDR3 motherboards support DDR3 modules rated at 1.5 and 1.65V.

=== Skylake chipsets (100 series and C230 series) ===
		H110	B150	Q150	H170	C236	Q170	Z170
Overclocking		CPU (via BCLK only; might be disabled in new motherboards and BIOS releases) + GPU + RAM (limited)						CPU (multiplier + BCLK) + GPU + RAM
Kaby Lake CPUs support		Yes, after a BIOS update						
Coffee Lake CPUs support		No						
Memory support		DDR4 (max. 32 GB total; 16 GB per slot) or DDR3(L) (max. 16 GB total; 8 GB per slot)	DDR4 (max. 64 GB total; 16 GB per slot) or DDR3(L) (max. 32 GB total; 8 GB per slot)					
Maximum DIMM slots		2	4					
Maximum USB ports	2.0	6				4		
Maximum USB ports	3.0	4	6	8		10		
Maximum SATA 3.0 ports		4	6			8	6	
Processor PCI Express v3.0 configuration		1 ×16				Either 1 ×16; 2 ×8; or 1 ×8 and 2 ×4		
PCH PCI Express configuration		6 × 2.0	8 × 3.0	10 × 3.0	16 × 3.0	20 × 3.0		
Independent Display Support (digital ports/pipes)		3/2	3/3					
SATA RAID 0/1/5/10 support		No			Yes	Intel Rapid Storage Technology Enterprise	Yes	
Intel Active Management, Trusted Execution and vPro Technology		No		Yes	No	Yes		No
Chipset TDP		6 W						
Chipset lithography		22 nm						
Release date		September 1, 2015		Q3'15	September 1, 2015	Q4'15	September 1, 2015	August 5, 2015

=== Kaby Lake chipsets (200 series) ===
There is no equivalent Kaby Lake chipset analogous to the H110 chipset. Four additional PCH PCI-E lanes in Kaby Lake chipsets are reserved for implementing an M.2 slot to support Intel Optane Memory. Otherwise, corresponding Kaby Lake and Skylake chipsets are practically the same.

Light blue indicates a difference between comparable Skylake and Kaby Lake chipsets.

		B250	Q250	H270	Q270	Z270
Overclocking		No				CPU (multiplier + BCLK) + GPU + RAM
Skylake CPUs support		Yes				
Coffee Lake CPUs support		No				
Memory support		DDR4 (max. 64 GB total; 16 GB per slot) or DDR3(L) (max. 32 GB total; 8 GB per slot)				
Maximum DIMM slots		4				
Maximum USB ports	2.0	6			4	
Maximum USB ports	3.0	6	8		10	
Maximum SATA 3.0 ports		6				
Processor PCI Express v3.0 configuration		1 ×16			Either 1 ×16; 2 ×8; or 1 ×8 and 2 ×4	
PCH PCI Express configuration		12 × 3.0	14 × 3.0	20 × 3.0	24 × 3.0	
Independent Display Support (digital ports/pipes)		3/3				
SATA RAID 0/1/5/10 support		No		Yes		
Intel Active Management, Trusted Execution and vPro Technology		No			Yes	No
Intel Optane Memory Support		Yes, requires Core i3/i5/i7 CPU				
Chipset TDP		6 W				
Chipset lithography		22 nm				
Release date		January 3, 2017				

== LGA 1151 revision 2 ==
The LGA 1151 socket was revised for the Coffee Lake generation CPUs and comes along with the Intel 300-series chipsets. While physical dimensions remain unchanged, the updated socket reassigns some reserved pins, adding power and ground lines to support the requirements of 6-core and 8-core CPUs. The new socket also relocates the processor detection pin, breaking compatibility with earlier processors and motherboards. As a result, desktop Coffee Lake CPUs are officially not compatible with the 100 (original Skylake) and 200 (Kaby Lake) series chipsets. Similarly, 300 series chipsets officially only support Coffee Lake and are not compatible with Skylake and Kaby Lake CPUs.

Socket 1151 rev 2 is sometimes also referred to as "1151-2".

=== Coffee Lake chipsets (300 series and C240 series) ===
Like with Kaby Lake chipsets, four additional PCH PCI-E lanes in Coffee Lake chipsets are reserved for implementing an M.2 slot to support Intel Optane Memory.

There's a 22 nm version of H310 chipset, H310C, which is sold only in China. Motherboards based on this chipset support DDR3 memory as well.

		H310	B365	B360	H370	C246	Q370	Z370	Z390
Overclocking		No						CPU (multiplier + BCLK) + GPU + RAM	
Skylake/Kaby Lake CPUs support		No							
Coffee Lake (8th gen) CPUs support		Yes							
Coffee Lake Refresh (9th gen) CPUs support		Yes with BIOS update	Yes	Yes with BIOS update					Yes
Memory [DDR4] by Coffee Lake generation	8th gen	Max. 32 GB total; 16 GB per slot	Max. 64 GB total; 16 GB per slot						
Memory [DDR4] by Coffee Lake generation	9th gen	Max. 64 GB total; 32 GB per slot	Max. 128 GB total; 32 GB per slot						
Maximum DIMM slots		2	4						
Maximum USB 2.0 ports		10	14	12	14				
Maximum USB 3.1 ports configuration	Gen1	4 Ports	8 Ports	6 Ports	8 Ports	10 Ports			
Maximum USB 3.1 ports configuration	Gen2	N/A		Up to 4 Ports		Up to 6 Ports		N/A	Up to 6 Ports
Maximum SATA 3.0 ports		4	6			8	6		
Processor PCI Express v3.0 configuration		1 ×16				Either 1 ×16; 2 ×8; or 1 ×8 and 2 ×4			
PCH PCI Express configuration		6 × 2.0	20 × 3.0	12 × 3.0	20 × 3.0	24 × 3.0			
Independent Display Support (digital ports/pipes)		3/2	3/3						
Integrated Wireless (802.11ac)		Yes**	No	Yes**				No	Yes**
SATA RAID 0/1/5/10 support		No	Yes	No	Yes	Intel Rapid Storage Technology Enterprise	Yes		
Intel Optane Memory Support		No	Yes, requires Core i3/i5/i7/i9 CPU			Yes, requires Core i3/i5/i7/i9 or Xeon E CPU	Yes, requires Core i3/i5/i7/i9 CPU		
Intel Smart Sound Technology		No	Yes						
Chipset TDP		6 W							
Chipset lithography		14 nm	22 nm	14 nm				22 nm	14 nm
Release date		April 2, 2018	Q4'18	April 2, 2018				October 5, 2017	October 8, 2018

** depends on OEM's implementation

== See also ==
- List of Intel microprocessors
- List of Intel chipsets
