= Comet Lake =

Intel processor family released in 2019

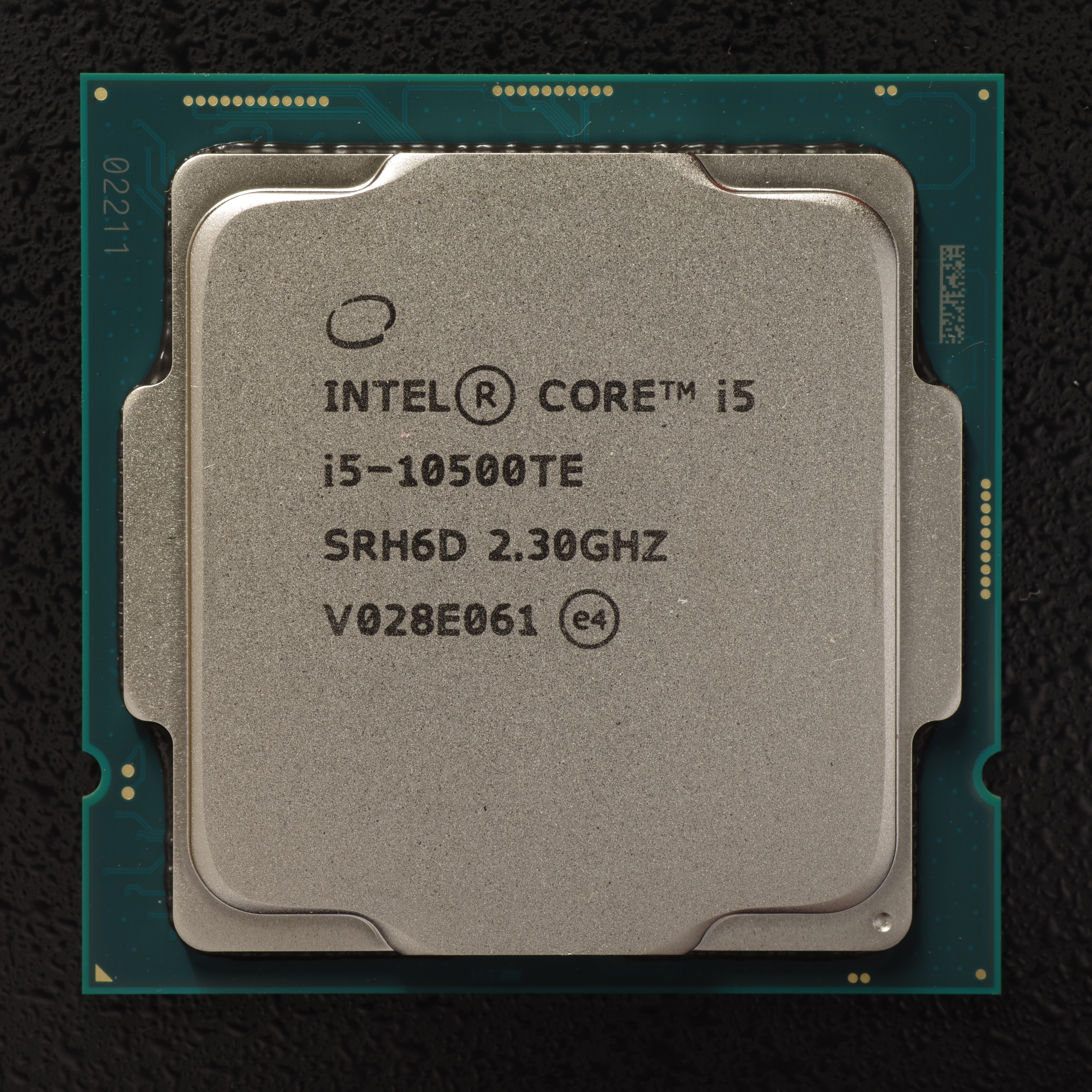
- An Intel Core i5 -10500TE

General information
- Launched: August 21, 2019; 7 years ago (official launch date, retail availability is later)
- Discontinued: December 16, 2020; 5 years ago (desktop except for low-end); September 30, 2022; 3 years ago (mobile)
- Marketed by: Intel
- Designed by: Intel
- Common manufacturer: Intel
- Product code: 80701

Performance
- Max. CPU clock rate: 1.1 GHz - 5.3 GHz
- DMI speeds: 8 GT/s

Physical specifications
- Cores: 2–10
- Sockets: Desktop; LGA 1200; Mobile; BGA 1440; BGA 1528

Cache
- L1 cache: 64 KB (Note: Transistorized memory, such as RAM, ROM, flash and cache sizes as well as file sizes are specified using binary meanings for K (1024^{1}), M (1024^{2}), G (1024^{3}), etc.) per core
- L2 cache: 256 KB per core
- L3 cache: 2 MB per core

Architecture and classification
- Technology node: Intel 14 nm++
- Microarchitecture: Skylake
- Instruction set: x86
- Instructions: x86-64
- Extensions: MMX, SSE, SSE2, SSE3, SSSE3, SSE4.1, SSE4.2, AVX, AVX2, FMA3, AES-NI, CLMUL, RDRAND; TXT, SGX, VT-x, VT-d

Products, models, variants
- Product code name: CML
- Brand name: Xeon W; Core i9; Core i7; Core i5; Core i3; Pentium; Celeron

History
- Predecessors: Mobile: Amber Lake Mobile: Whiskey Lake (3rd optimization) Desktop: Coffee Lake
- Successors: Same generation: Ice Lake (10nm, new architecture); Next generation: Tiger Lake (mobile); Rocket Lake (desktop)

Support status
- Legacy support for iGPU

Comet Lake is Intel's 10th-generation Core-branded processor family. They are manufactured using Intel's third 14 nm Skylake process revision, succeeding the Whiskey Lake U-series mobile processor and Coffee Lake desktop processor families. Intel announced low-power mobile Comet Lake-U CPUs on August 21, 2019, H-series mobile CPUs on April 2, 2020, desktop Comet Lake-S CPUs on April 30, 2020, and Xeon W-1200 series workstation CPUs on May 13, 2020. Comet Lake processors and Ice Lake 10 nm processors are together branded as the Intel "10th Generation Core" family. In March 2021, Intel officially launched Comet Lake-Refresh Core i3 and Pentium CPUs on the same day as the 11th Gen Core Rocket Lake launch. The low-power mobile Comet Lake-U Core and Celeron 5205U CPUs were discontinued on July 7, 2021.

== Generational changes ==
All Comet Lake CPUs feature an updated Platform Controller Hub with CNVio2 controller with Wi-Fi 6 and external AX201 CRF module support.

Comet Lake-S compared to Coffee Lake-S Refresh

- Up to ten CPU cores
- Hyperthreading on all models, except for Celeron
- Single core turbo boost up to 5.3 GHz (300 MHz higher); all-core turbo boost up to 4.9 GHz; Thermal Velocity Boost for Core i9; Turbo Boost Max 3.0 support for Core i7 and i9
- DDR4-2933 memory support for Core i7 and i9; DDR4-2666 for Core i3, Core i5, Pentium Gold, Celeron
- 400-series chipset based on the LGA 1200 socket

Comet Lake-H compared to Coffee Lake-H Refresh

- Higher turbo frequencies by up to 300 MHz
- DDR4-2933 memory support
- Thermal Velocity Boost for Core i7 and i9

Comet Lake-U compared to Whiskey Lake-U

- Up to six CPU cores
- Higher turbo frequencies by up to 300 MHz
- DDR4-2666 and LPDDR3-2133 memory support

One notable architectural change of Comet Lake from its predecessors is removal of TSX instruction set extensions.

Entry-level CPUs like the i3 series no longer support ECC memory.

== List of 10th generation Comet Lake processors ==
=== Desktop ===
==== Comet Lake-S ====
Pentium and Celeron CPUs lack AVX and AVX2 support.

Processor branding	Model	Cores (Threads)	CPU clock rate (GHz)					GPU		Smart cache (L3)	TDP		Memory support	Price (USD) (Note: Price is Recommended Customer Price (RCP) at launch. RCP is the trade price that processors are sold by Intel to retailers and OEMs. Actual MSRP for consumers is higher.)
Processor branding	Model	Cores (Threads)	Base	Turbo Boost				Model	Max clock rate (GHz)	Smart cache (L3)	TDP		Memory support	Price (USD)
Processor branding	Model	Cores (Threads)	Base	All-Core	2.0	3.0	TVB	Model	Max clock rate (GHz)	Smart cache (L3)	Base	Down	Memory support	Price (USD)
Core i9	10900K	10 (20)	3.7	4.8	5.1	5.2	5.3	UHD 630	1.20	20 MB	125 W	95 W	DDR4-2933 dual-channel up to 128 GB	$488
Core i9	10900KF	10 (20)	3.7	4.8	5.1	5.2	5.3	—N/a		20 MB	125 W	95 W	DDR4-2933 dual-channel up to 128 GB	$472
Core i9	10910	10 (20)	3.6	4.7	5.0	—N/a	—N/a	UHD 630	1.2	20 MB	125 W	95 W	DDR4-2933 dual-channel up to 128 GB	OEM
Core i9	10900	10 (20)	2.8	4.5	5.0	5.1	5.2	UHD 630	1.2	20 MB	65 W	—N/a	DDR4-2933 dual-channel up to 128 GB	$438
Core i9	10900F	10 (20)	2.8	4.5	5.0	5.1	5.2	—N/a		20 MB	65 W	—N/a	DDR4-2933 dual-channel up to 128 GB	$422
Core i9	10900T	10 (20)	1.9	3.7	4.5	4.6	—N/a	UHD 630	1.2	20 MB	35 W	25 W	DDR4-2933 dual-channel up to 128 GB	$438
Core i9	10850K	10 (20)	3.6	4.8	5.0	5.1	5.2	UHD 630	1.2	20 MB	125 W	95 W	DDR4-2933 dual-channel up to 128 GB	$453
Core i7	10700K	8 (16)	3.8	4.7	5.0	5.1	—N/a	UHD 630	1.2	16 MB	125 W	95 W	DDR4-2933 dual-channel up to 128 GB	$374
Core i7	10700KF	8 (16)	3.8	4.7	5.0	5.1	—N/a	—N/a		16 MB	125 W	95 W	DDR4-2933 dual-channel up to 128 GB	$349
Core i7	10700	8 (16)	2.9	4.6	4.7	4.8	—N/a	UHD 630	1.2	16 MB	65 W	—N/a	DDR4-2933 dual-channel up to 128 GB	$323
Core i7	10700F	8 (16)	2.9	4.6	4.7	4.8	—N/a	—N/a		16 MB	65 W	—N/a	DDR4-2933 dual-channel up to 128 GB	$298
Core i7	10700T	8 (16)	2.0	3.7	4.4	4.5	—N/a	UHD 630	1.2	16 MB	35 W	25 W	DDR4-2933 dual-channel up to 128 GB	$325
Core i5	10600K	6 (12)	4.1	4.5	4.8	—N/a	—N/a	UHD 630	1.2	12 MB	125 W	95 W	DDR4-2666 dual-channel up to 128 GB	$262
Core i5	10600KF	6 (12)	4.1	4.5	4.8	—N/a	—N/a	—N/a		12 MB	125 W	95 W	DDR4-2666 dual-channel up to 128 GB	$237
Core i5	10600	6 (12)	3.3	4.4	4.8	—N/a	—N/a	UHD 630	1.2	12 MB	65 W	—N/a	DDR4-2666 dual-channel up to 128 GB	$213
Core i5	10600T	6 (12)	2.4	3.7	4.0	—N/a	—N/a	UHD 630	1.2	12 MB	35 W	25 W	DDR4-2666 dual-channel up to 128 GB	$213
Core i5	10500	6 (12)	3.1	4.2	4.5	—N/a	—N/a	UHD 630	1.15	12 MB	65 W	—N/a	DDR4-2666 dual-channel up to 128 GB	$192
Core i5	10500T	6 (12)	2.3	3.5	3.8	—N/a	—N/a	UHD 630	1.15	12 MB	35 W	25 W	DDR4-2666 dual-channel up to 128 GB	$192
Core i5	10400	6 (12)	2.9	4.0	4.3	—N/a	—N/a	UHD 630	1.1	12 MB	65 W	—N/a	DDR4-2666 dual-channel up to 128 GB	$182
Core i5	10400F	6 (12)	2.9	4.0	4.3	—N/a	—N/a	—N/a		12 MB	65 W	—N/a	DDR4-2666 dual-channel up to 128 GB	$157
Core i5	10400T	6 (12)	2.0	3.2	3.6	—N/a	—N/a	UHD 630	1.1	12 MB	35 W	25 W	DDR4-2666 dual-channel up to 128 GB	$182
Core i3	10320	4 (8)	3.8	4.4	4.6	—N/a	—N/a	UHD 630	1.15	8 MB	65 W	—N/a	DDR4-2666 dual-channel up to 128 GB	$154
Core i3	10300	4 (8)	3.7	4.2	4.4	—N/a	—N/a	UHD 630	1.15	8 MB	65 W	—N/a	DDR4-2666 dual-channel up to 128 GB	$143
Core i3	10300T	4 (8)	3.0	3.6	3.9	—N/a	—N/a	UHD 630	1.1	8 MB	35 W	25 W	DDR4-2666 dual-channel up to 128 GB	$143
Core i3	10100	4 (8)	3.6	4.1	4.3	—N/a	—N/a	UHD 630	1.1	6 MB	65 W	—N/a	DDR4-2666 dual-channel up to 128 GB	$122
Core i3	10100F	4 (8)	3.6	4.1	4.3	—N/a	—N/a	—N/a		6 MB	65 W	—N/a	DDR4-2666 dual-channel up to 128 GB	$79
Core i3	10100T	4 (8)	3.0	3.5	3.8	—N/a	—N/a	UHD 630	1.1	6 MB	35 W	25 W	DDR4-2666 dual-channel up to 128 GB	$122
Pentium; Gold	G6600	2 (4)	4.2	—N/a		—N/a	—N/a	UHD 630	1.1	4 MB	58 W	—N/a	DDR4-2666 dual-channel up to 128 GB	$86
Pentium; Gold	G6500	2 (4)	4.1	—N/a		—N/a	—N/a	UHD 630	1.1	4 MB	58 W	—N/a	DDR4-2666 dual-channel up to 128 GB	$75
Pentium; Gold	G6500T	2 (4)	3.5	—N/a		—N/a	—N/a	UHD 630	1.05	4 MB	35 W	25 W	DDR4-2666 dual-channel up to 128 GB	$75
Pentium; Gold	G6400	2 (4)	4.0	—N/a		—N/a	—N/a	UHD 610	1.05	4 MB	58 W	—N/a	DDR4-2666 dual-channel up to 128 GB	$64
Pentium; Gold	G6400T	2 (4)	3.4	—N/a		—N/a	—N/a	UHD 610	1.05	4 MB	35 W	25 W	DDR4-2666 dual-channel up to 128 GB	$64
Celeron	G5925	2 (2)	3.6	—N/a		—N/a	—N/a	UHD 610	1.05	4 MB	58 W	—N/a	DDR4-2666 dual-channel up to 128 GB	$52
Celeron	G5920	2 (2)	3.5	—N/a		—N/a	—N/a	UHD 610	1.05	2 MB	58 W	—N/a	DDR4-2666 dual-channel up to 128 GB	$52
Celeron	G5905	2 (2)	3.5	—N/a		—N/a	—N/a	UHD 610	1.05	4 MB	58 W	—N/a	DDR4-2666 dual-channel up to 128 GB	$42
Celeron	G5905T	2 (2)	3.3	—N/a		—N/a	—N/a	UHD 610	1.0	4 MB	35 W	25 W	DDR4-2666 dual-channel up to 128 GB	$42
Celeron	G5900	2 (2)	3.4	—N/a		—N/a	—N/a	UHD 610	1.05	2 MB	58 W	—N/a	DDR4-2666 dual-channel up to 128 GB	$42
Celeron	G5900T	2 (2)	3.2	—N/a		—N/a	—N/a	UHD 610	1.0	2 MB	35 W	25 W	DDR4-2666 dual-channel up to 128 GB	$42

==== Comet Lake-W (Workstation) ====
Comet Lake-W CPUs support UDIMM ECC memory and require the W480 chipset.

Processor branding	Model	Cores (threads)	CPU clock rate (GHz)				GPU	Smart cache (L3)	TDP	Memory support	Price (USD)
Processor branding	Model	Cores (threads)	Base	Turbo Boost			GPU	Smart cache (L3)	TDP	Memory support	Price (USD)
Processor branding	Model	Cores (threads)	Base	2.0	3.0	TVB	GPU	Smart cache (L3)	TDP	Memory support	Price (USD)
Xeon W	1290P	10 (20)	3.7	5.1	5.2	5.3	UHD P630	20 MB	125 W	DDR4-2933 2-channel up to 128 GB with ECC	$594
Xeon W	1290	10 (20)	3.2	5.0	5.1	5.2	UHD P630	20 MB	80 W	DDR4-2933 2-channel up to 128 GB with ECC	$546
Xeon W	1290T	10 (20)	1.9	4.6	4.7	—N/a	UHD P630	20 MB	35 W	DDR4-2933 2-channel up to 128 GB with ECC	$546
Xeon W	1270P	8 (16)	3.8	5.0	5.1	—N/a	UHD P630	16 MB	125 W	DDR4-2933 2-channel up to 128 GB with ECC	$472
Xeon W	1270	8 (16)	3.4	4.9	5.0	—N/a	UHD P630	16 MB	80 W	DDR4-2933 2-channel up to 128 GB with ECC	$398
Xeon W	1250P	6 (12)	4.1	4.8	—N/a	—N/a	UHD P630	12 MB	125 W	DDR4-2666 2-channel up to 128 GB with ECC	$342
Xeon W	1250	6 (12)	3.3	4.7	—N/a	—N/a	UHD P630	12 MB	80 W	DDR4-2666 2-channel up to 128 GB with ECC	$280

=== Mobile ===
==== Comet Lake-H (High power) ====
Core i5 CPUs lack Thermal Velocity Boost.

Processor branding	Model	Cores (threads)	CPU clock speed (GHz)		GPU		Smart cache (L3)	TDP			Memory support	Price (USD)
Processor branding	Model	Cores (threads)	Base	Max. Turbo	Model	Max. freq. (GHz)	Smart cache (L3)	TDP			Memory support	Price (USD)
Processor branding	Model	Cores (threads)	Base	Max. Turbo	Model	Max. freq. (GHz)	Smart cache (L3)	Base	Down	Up	Memory support	Price (USD)
Xeon W	10885M	8 (16)	2.4	5.3	UHD 630	1.25	16 MB	45 W	35 W	—N/a	DDR4-2933 2-channel up to 128 GB	$623
Xeon W	10855M	6 (12)	2.8	5.1	UHD 630	1.20	12 MB	45 W	35 W	—N/a	DDR4-2933 2-channel up to 128 GB	$450
Core i9	10980HK	8 (16)	2.4	5.3	UHD 630	1.25	16 MB	45 W	—N/a	65 W	DDR4-2933 2-channel up to 128 GB	$583
Core i9	10885H	8 (16)	2.4	5.3	UHD 630	1.25	16 MB	45 W	35 W	—N/a	DDR4-2933 2-channel up to 128 GB	$556
Core i7	10875H	8 (16)	2.3	5.1	UHD 630	1.20	16 MB	45 W	35 W	—N/a	DDR4-2933 2-channel up to 128 GB	$450
Core i7	10870H	8 (16)	2.2	5.0	UHD 630	1.20	16 MB	45 W	35 W	—N/a	DDR4-2933 2-channel up to 128 GB	$417
Core i7	10850H	6 (12)	2.7	5.1	UHD 630	1.15	12 MB	45 W	35 W	—N/a	DDR4-2933 2-channel up to 128 GB	$395
Core i7	10750H	6 (12)	2.6	5.0	UHD 630	1.15	12 MB	45 W	35 W	—N/a	DDR4-2933 2-channel up to 128 GB	$395
Core i5	10500H	6 (12)	2.5	4.5	UHD 630	1.05	12 MB	45 W	35 W	—N/a	DDR4-2933 2-channel up to 128 GB	$250
Core i5	10400H	4 (8)	2.6	4.6	UHD 630	1.10	8 MB	45 W	35 W	—N/a	DDR4-2933 2-channel up to 128 GB	$250
Core i5	10300H	4 (8)	2.5	4.5	UHD 630	1.05	8 MB	45 W	35 W	—N/a	DDR4-2933 2-channel up to 128 GB	$250
Core i5	10200H	4 (8)	2.4	4.1	UHD 610	1.05	8 MB	45 W	35 W	—N/a	DDR4-2933 2-channel up to 128 GB	$250

==== Comet Lake-U (Medium power) ====
The following SKUs additionally support Intel vPro and LPDDR4-2933 memory: i5-10310U, i7-10610U, i7-10810U.

Pentium and Celeron CPUs lack AVX2 support.

Processor branding	Model	Cores (Threads)	CPU clock speed (GHz)		GPU		L3 cache (MB)	TDP			Memory support	Price (USD)
Processor branding	Model	Cores (Threads)	Base	Max. Turbo	Model	Max. freq. (GHz)	L3 cache (MB)	TDP			Memory support	Price (USD)
Processor branding	Model	Cores (Threads)	Base	Max. Turbo	Model	Max. freq. (GHz)	L3 cache (MB)	Down	Base	Up	Memory support	Price (USD)
Core i7	10810U	6 (12)	1.1	4.9	UHD 620	1.15	12 MB	12.5 W	15 W	25 W	DDR4-2666 LPDDR4-2933 LPDDR3-2133	$443
Core i7	10710U	6 (12)	1.1	4.7	UHD 620	1.15	12 MB	12.5 W	15 W	25 W	DDR4-2666 LPDDR4-2933 LPDDR3-2133	$443
Core i7	10610U	4 (8)	1.8	4.9	UHD 620	1.15	8 MB	10 W	15 W	25 W	DDR4-2666 LPDDR4-2933 LPDDR3-2133	$409
Core i7	10510U	4 (8)	1.8	4.9	UHD 620	1.15	8 MB	10 W	15 W	25 W	DDR4-2666 LPDDR4-2933 LPDDR3-2133	$409
Core i5	10310U	4 (8)	1.7	4.4	UHD 620	1.15	6 MB	10 W	15 W	25 W	DDR4-2666 LPDDR4-2933 LPDDR3-2133	$297
Core i5	10210U	4 (8)	1.6	4.2	UHD 620	1.10	6 MB	10 W	15 W	25 W	DDR4-2666 LPDDR4-2933 LPDDR3-2133	$297
Core i3	10110U	2 (4)	2.1	4.1	UHD 620	1.00	4 MB	10 W	15 W	25 W	DDR4-2666 LPDDR4-2933 LPDDR3-2133	$281
Pentium	6405U	2 (4)	2.4	—N/a	UHD 610	0.95	2 MB	12.5 W	15 W	—N/a	DDR4-2400 LPDDR3-2133	$161
Celeron	5305U	2 (2)	2.3	—N/a	UHD 610	0.90	2 MB	12.5 W	15 W	—N/a	DDR4-2400 LPDDR3-2133	$107
Celeron	5205U	2 (2)	1.9	—N/a	UHD 610	0.90	2 MB	12.5 W	15 W	—N/a	DDR4-2400 LPDDR3-2133	$107

== List of 10th generation Comet Lake Refresh processors ==
=== Desktop processors ===
On March 16, 2021, Intel announced the refreshed models of Comet Lake Core i3 and Pentium Gold processors. These processors have the same characteristics as their original parts, albeit with a 100MHz higher frequency and the last digit changing from zero to five.

Processor branding	Model	Cores (Threads)	CPU clock rate (GHz)			GPU		Smart cache (MB)	TDP		Memory support	Price (USD)
Processor branding	Model	Cores (Threads)	Base	All-Core Turbo	Turbo Boost 2.0	Model	Max. freq. (GHz)	Smart cache (MB)	TDP		Memory support	Price (USD)
Processor branding	Model	Cores (Threads)	Base	All-Core Turbo	Turbo Boost 2.0	Model	Max. freq. (GHz)	Smart cache (MB)	Down	Base	Memory support	Price (USD)
Core i5	10505	6 (12)	3.2	4.3	4.6	UHD 630	1.2	12	N/A	65 W	DDR4-2666 2-channel up to 128 GB	$192
Core i3	10325	4 (8)	3.9	4.5	4.7	UHD 630	1.15	8	—N/a	65 W	DDR4-2666 2-channel up to 128 GB	$154
Core i3	10305	4 (8)	3.8	4.3	4.5	UHD 630	1.15	8	—N/a	65 W	DDR4-2666 2-channel up to 128 GB	$143
Core i3	10305T	4 (8)	3.0	3.7	4.0	UHD 630	1.10	8	25 W	35 W	DDR4-2666 2-channel up to 128 GB	$143
Core i3	10105	4 (8)	3.7	4.2	4.4	UHD 630	1.10	6	—N/a	65 W	DDR4-2666 2-channel up to 128 GB	$122
Core i3	10105F	4 (8)	3.7	4.2	4.4	—N/a		6	—N/a	65 W	DDR4-2666 2-channel up to 128 GB	$97
Core i3	10105T	4 (8)	3.0	3.6	3.9	UHD 630	1.10	6	25 W	35 W	DDR4-2666 2-channel up to 128 GB	$122
Pentium Gold	G6605	2 (4)	4.3	—N/a		UHD 630	1.10	4	—N/a	58 W	DDR4-2666 2-channel up to 128 GB	$86
Pentium Gold	G6505	2 (4)	4.2	—N/a		UHD 630	1.10	4	—N/a	58 W	DDR4-2666 2-channel up to 128 GB	$75
Pentium Gold	G6505T	2 (4)	3.6	—N/a		UHD 630	1.05	4	25 W	35 W	DDR4-2666 2-channel up to 128 GB	$75
Pentium Gold	G6405	2 (4)	4.1	—N/a		UHD 610	1.05	4	—N/a	58 W	DDR4-2666 2-channel up to 128 GB	$64
Pentium Gold	G6405T	2 (4)	3.3	—N/a		UHD 610	1.05	4	25 W	35 W	DDR4-2666 2-channel up to 128 GB	$64

Atom (ULV)		Node name	Pentium/Core						
Microarch.	Step	Node name	Microarch.	Step					
		600 nm	P6	Pentium Pro (133 MHz)					
		500 nm	P6	Pentium Pro (150 MHz)					
		350 nm	P6	Pentium Pro (166–200 MHz)					
		350 nm	P6	Klamath					
		250 nm	P6	Deschutes					
		250 nm	P6	Katmai	NetBurst				
		180 nm	P6	Coppermine	Willamette				
		130 nm	P6	Tualatin	Northwood				
		130 nm	Pentium M	Banias	Northwood		NetBurst(HT)		NetBurst(×2)
		90 nm	Pentium M	Dothan	Prescott	⇨	Prescott‑2M	⇨	Smithfield
		90 nm	Pentium M	Dothan	~~Tejas~~	→	⇩	→	~~Cedarmill (Tejas)~~
		65 nm	Pentium M	Yonah	~~Nehalem (NetBurst)~~		Cedar Mill	⇨	Presler
		65 nm	Core	Merom	4 cores on mainstream desktop, DDR3 introduced				
Bonnell	Bonnell	45 nm	Core	Penryn					
Bonnell	Bonnell	45 nm	Nehalem	Nehalem	HT reintroduced, integrated MC, PCH; L3-cache introduced, 256 KB L2-cache/core				
Bonnell	Saltwell	32 nm	Nehalem	Westmere	Introduced GPU on same package and AES-NI				
Bonnell	Saltwell	32 nm	Sandy Bridge	Sandy Bridge	On-die ring bus, no more non-UEFI motherboards				
Silvermont	Silvermont	22 nm	Sandy Bridge	Ivy Bridge					
Silvermont	Silvermont	22 nm	Haswell	Haswell	Fully integrated voltage regulator				
Silvermont	Airmont	14 nm	Haswell	Broadwell					
Silvermont	Airmont	14 nm	Skylake	Skylake	DDR4 introduced on mainstream desktop				
Goldmont		14 nm	Skylake	Kaby Lake					
Goldmont		14 nm	Skylake	Coffee Lake	6 cores on mainstream desktop				
Goldmont		14 nm	Skylake	Amber Lake	Mobile-only				
Goldmont Plus		14 nm	Skylake	Whiskey Lake	Mobile-only				
Goldmont Plus		14 nm	Skylake	Coffee Lake Refresh	8 cores on mainstream desktop				
Goldmont Plus		14 nm	Skylake	Comet Lake	10 cores on mainstream desktop				
Goldmont Plus		14 nm	Sunny Cove	Cypress Cove (Rocket Lake)	Backported Sunny Cove microarchitecture for 14 nm				
Tremont		10 nm	Skylake	Palm Cove (Cannon Lake)	Mobile-only				
Tremont		10 nm	Sunny Cove	Sunny Cove (Ice Lake)	512 KB L2-cache/core				
Tremont		10 nm	Sunny Cove	Willow Cove (Tiger Lake)	X^{e} graphics engine				
Gracemont		Intel 7 (10 nm ESF)	Golden Cove	Golden Cove (Alder Lake)	Hybrid, DDR5, PCIe 5.0				
Gracemont		Intel 7 (10 nm ESF)	Golden Cove	Raptor Cove (Raptor Lake)					
Crestmont		Intel 4	Redwood Cove	Meteor Lake	Mobile-only; NPU, chiplet architecture				
Crestmont		Intel 3	Redwood Cove	Arrow Lake-U					
Skymont		TSMC N3B	Lion Cove	Lunar Lake	Low power mobile only (9–30 W)				
Skymont		TSMC N3B	Lion Cove	Arrow Lake					
Darkmont		Intel 18A	Cougar Cove	Panther Lake					
Arctic Wolf		Intel 18A and/or TSMC N2P	Coyote Cove	Nova Lake					
