= LGA 1200 =

CPU socket for Intel desktop processors

- Release date: May 27, 2020
- Designed by: Intel
- Manufactured by: Foxconn
- Type: LGA-ZIF
- Chip form factors: Flip-chip
- Contacts: 1200
- FSB protocol: PCI Express
- Processor dimensions: 37.5 × 37.5 mm 1,406.25 mm²
- Processors: Comet Lake; Rocket Lake
- Predecessor: LGA 1151
- Successor: LGA 1700
- Memory support: DDR4
- This article is part of the CPU socket series

LGA 1200, also known as Socket H5, is a zero insertion force flip-chip land grid array (LGA) socket, compatible with Intel desktop processors Comet Lake (10th gen) and Rocket Lake (11th-gen) desktop CPUs, which was released in April 2020.

LGA 1200 is designed as a replacement for the LGA 1151 (known as Socket H4). LGA 1200 is a land grid array mount with 1200 protruding pins to make contact with the pads on the processor. It uses a modified design of LGA 1151, with 49 more pins on it, improving power delivery and offering support for future incremental I/O features. Pin 1 position remains the same as it was in previous generation processors, but it has shifted socket keying to left (previously it was right), making Comet Lake processors incompatible both electrically and mechanically with previous chips.

ASRock, Asus, Biostar, Gigabyte and MSI have confirmed their motherboards based on the Intel Z490 chipset support the 11th generation Intel Rocket Lake desktop CPUs. Full PCIe 4.0 support is confirmed for selected brands. ASUS did not include support to PCIe 4.0 on M.2, hindering support for PCIe gen 4.0 NVMe SSDs.

== Heatsink ==
Pads of an Intel Core i9-10900K

The 4 holes for fastening the heatsink to the motherboard are placed in a square with a lateral length of 75 mm for Intel's sockets LGA 1156, LGA 1155, LGA 1150, LGA 1151 and LGA 1200. Cooling solutions should therefore be interchangeable.

== Comet Lake chipsets (400 series) ==
Memory support configuration common for all chipsets:

- Dual channel DDR4-2666 or DDR4-2933

		H410	B460	H470	Q470	Z490	W480
Overclocking		Thermal limits CPU overclocking is offered by ASRock, ASUS and MSI			No	Yes	No
Bus Interface		DMI 3.0 x4					
CPU support		Comet Lake-S only		Comet Lake-S / Rocket Lake (a BIOS update is required)			
Memory support		Up to 64 GB	Up to 128 GB				
Maximum DIMM slots		2	4				
ECC memory		No					UDIMM
Maximum USB 2.0 ports		10	12	14			
USB 3.2 ports configuration	Gen 1x1	Up to 4	Up to 8		Up to 10		
USB 3.2 ports configuration	Gen 2x1	N/A		Up to 4	Up to 6		Up to 8
Maximum SATA 3.0 ports		4	6				8
Processor PCI Express v3.0 configuration		1x16			1x16 or 2x8 or 1x8+2x4		
PCH PCI Express configuration		6	16	20	24		
Independent Display Support (digital ports/pipes)		2	3				
Integrated Wireless (802.11ax)		No		Intel Wi-Fi 6 AX201 (Note: depends on OEM's implementation)			
SATA RAID 0/1/5/10 support		No	Yes				
Intel Optane Memory Support		No	Yes				
Intel Smart Sound Technology		No	Yes				
Intel Active Management, Trusted Execution and vPro Technology		No			Yes	No	Yes
Chipset TDP		6W					
Chipset lithography		22 nm		14 nm			
Release date		Q2 2020					

== Rocket Lake chipsets (500 series) ==
Memory support configuration common for all chipsets (except W580):

- Dual channel
- DDR4-3200 for 11th generation Rocket Lake Core i9/i7/i5 CPUs
- DDR4-2933 for 10th generation Comet Lake Core i9/i7 CPUs
- DDR4-2666 for all other CPUs
- Up to 128 GB using 32 GB modules; maximum 64 GB for the H510 chipset

W580 based motherboards support DDR4-3200 RAM in dual channel mode.

			H510	B560	H570	Q570	Z590	W580
Overclocking			No	RAM only		No	Yes	RAM only
Bus Interface			DMI 3.0 x4		DMI 3.0 x8 (runs in x4 mode for Comet Lake-S CPUs)			
CPU support			Comet Lake-S / Rocket Lake					Rocket Lake
Maximum DIMM slots			2	4				
ECC memory			No					UDIMM
Maximum USB 2.0 ports			10	12	14			
USB 3.2 ports configuration	Gen 1x1		Up to 4	Up to 6	Up to 8	Up to 10	Up to 10	
USB 3.2 ports configuration	Gen 2	x1	—N/a	Up to 4		Up to 8	Up to 10	
USB 3.2 ports configuration	Gen 2	x2	—N/a	Up to 2		Up to 3		
Maximum SATA 3.0 ports			4	6				8
Processor PCI Express v4.0 configuration			1x16	1x16 + 1x4		1x16 + 1x4 or 2x8 + 1x4 or 1x8 + 3x4		
PCH PCI Express configuration			6	12	20	24		
Independent Display Support (digital ports/pipes)			2	3				
Integrated Wireless (802.11ax)			Intel Wi-Fi 6 AX201					
PCIe RAID 0/1/5/10 support			No		Yes			
SATA RAID 0/1/5/10 support			No		Yes			
Intel Optane Memory Support			No	Yes				
Intel Smart Sound Technology			No	Yes				
Intel Active Management, Trusted Execution and vPro Technology			No			Yes	No	Yes
Chipset TDP			6W					
Chipset lithography			14 nm					
Release date			Q1 2021					

== See also ==
- List of Intel microprocessors
- List of Intel chipsets
