= Willow Cove =

CPU microarchitecture by Intel

General information
- Launched: September 12, 2020; 5 years ago
- Designed by: Intel
- Common manufacturer: Intel

Cache
- L1 cache: 80 KB per core: (32 KB instructions + 48 KB data)

Architecture and classification
- Technology node: Intel 10 nm SuperFin (10SF)
- Instruction set: x86-64
- Extensions: AES-NI, CLMUL, RDRAND, SHA, TXT, MMX, SSE, SSE2, SSE3, SSSE3, SSE4.1, SSE4.2, AVX, AVX2, AVX-512, FMA3, VT-x, VT-d

Products, models, variants
- Product code name: Tiger Lake

History
- Predecessor: Sunny Cove
- Successor: Golden Cove

Willow Cove is a codename for a CPU microarchitecture developed by Intel and released in September 2020. Willow Cove is the successor to the Sunny Cove microarchitecture, and is fabricated using Intel's enhanced 10 nm process node called 10 nm SuperFin (10SF). The microarchitecture powers 11th-generation Intel Core mobile processors (codenamed "Tiger Lake").

The Willow Cove microarchitecture was succeeded by Golden Cove.

== Features ==
Intel first described Tiger Lake and Willow Cove during their Architecture Day in 2020. Willow Cove is almost identical to the previous microarchitecture but introduces new security features, a redesigned cache subsystem, and higher clock speeds. Intel claims that these changes, in addition to the new 10SF process node, give an additional 10–20% performance increase from Sunny Cove.

=== Improvements ===
- Larger L2 caches (1.25 MB per core from 512 KB per core)
- Larger L3 caches (3 MB per core from 2 MB per core)
- A new AVX-512 instruction: Vector Pair Intersection to a Pair of Mask Registers, VP2INTERSECT
- Control Flow Enforcement Technology to prevent return-oriented programming and jump-oriented programming exploitation techniques
- Full memory (RAM) encryption
- Indirect branch tracking and shadow stack
- Intel Key Locker
- AVX/AVX2 instructions support for Pentium Gold and Celeron processors has been unlocked

== Products ==
Willow Cove powers Intel's 11th-generation Intel Core mobile processors (codenamed Tiger Lake). Tiger Lake-U processors were released on September 2, 2020, while Tiger Lake-H35 were released on January 11, 2021. Tiger Lake-H processors were launched on May 11, 2021.

Atom (ULV)		Node name	Pentium/Core						
Microarch.	Step	Node name	Microarch.	Step					
		600 nm	P6	Pentium Pro (133 MHz)					
		500 nm	P6	Pentium Pro (150 MHz)					
		350 nm	P6	Pentium Pro (166–200 MHz)					
		350 nm	P6	Klamath					
		250 nm	P6	Deschutes					
		250 nm	P6	Katmai	NetBurst				
		180 nm	P6	Coppermine	Willamette				
		130 nm	P6	Tualatin	Northwood				
		130 nm	Pentium M	Banias	Northwood		NetBurst(HT)		NetBurst(×2)
		90 nm	Pentium M	Dothan	Prescott	⇨	Prescott‑2M	⇨	Smithfield
		90 nm	Pentium M	Dothan	~~Tejas~~	→	⇩	→	~~Cedarmill (Tejas)~~
		65 nm	Pentium M	Yonah	~~Nehalem (NetBurst)~~		Cedar Mill	⇨	Presler
		65 nm	Core	Merom	4 cores on mainstream desktop, DDR3 introduced				
Bonnell	Bonnell	45 nm	Core	Penryn					
Bonnell	Bonnell	45 nm	Nehalem	Nehalem	HT reintroduced, integrated MC, PCH; L3-cache introduced, 256 KB L2-cache/core				
Bonnell	Saltwell	32 nm	Nehalem	Westmere	Introduced GPU on same package and AES-NI				
Bonnell	Saltwell	32 nm	Sandy Bridge	Sandy Bridge	On-die ring bus, no more non-UEFI motherboards				
Silvermont	Silvermont	22 nm	Sandy Bridge	Ivy Bridge					
Silvermont	Silvermont	22 nm	Haswell	Haswell	Fully integrated voltage regulator				
Silvermont	Airmont	14 nm	Haswell	Broadwell					
Silvermont	Airmont	14 nm	Skylake	Skylake	DDR4 introduced on mainstream desktop				
Goldmont		14 nm	Skylake	Kaby Lake					
Goldmont		14 nm	Skylake	Coffee Lake	6 cores on mainstream desktop				
Goldmont		14 nm	Skylake	Amber Lake	Mobile-only				
Goldmont Plus		14 nm	Skylake	Whiskey Lake	Mobile-only				
Goldmont Plus		14 nm	Skylake	Coffee Lake Refresh	8 cores on mainstream desktop				
Goldmont Plus		14 nm	Skylake	Comet Lake	10 cores on mainstream desktop				
Goldmont Plus		14 nm	Sunny Cove	Cypress Cove (Rocket Lake)	Backported Sunny Cove microarchitecture for 14 nm				
Tremont		10 nm	Skylake	Palm Cove (Cannon Lake)	Mobile-only				
Tremont		10 nm	Sunny Cove	Sunny Cove (Ice Lake)	512 KB L2-cache/core				
Tremont		10 nm	Sunny Cove	Willow Cove (Tiger Lake)	X^{e} graphics engine				
Gracemont		Intel 7 (10 nm ESF)	Golden Cove	Golden Cove (Alder Lake)	Hybrid, DDR5, PCIe 5.0				
Gracemont		Intel 7 (10 nm ESF)	Golden Cove	Raptor Cove (Raptor Lake)					
Crestmont		Intel 4	Redwood Cove	Meteor Lake	Mobile-only; NPU, chiplet architecture				
Crestmont		Intel 3	Redwood Cove	Arrow Lake-U					
Skymont		TSMC N3B	Lion Cove	Lunar Lake	Low power mobile only (9–30 W)				
Skymont		TSMC N3B	Lion Cove	Arrow Lake					
Darkmont		Intel 18A	Cougar Cove	Panther Lake					
Arctic Wolf		Intel 18A and/or TSMC N2P	Coyote Cove	Nova Lake					
