= Ice Lake (microprocessor) =

Intel microprocessor family launched in 2019

General information
- Launched: September 2019
- Marketed by: Intel
- Designed by: Intel
- Common manufacturer: Intel
- CPUID code: 703E5
- Product code: 80689

Performance
- Max. CPU clock rate: 4.1 GHz
- DMI speeds: 8 GT/s

Physical specifications
- Cores: 2–4
- GPU: Gen11
- Socket: BGA 1526

Cache
- L1 cache: 80 KB (per core): 32 KB instructions; 48 KB data
- L2 cache: 512 KB (per core)
- L3 cache: Up to 8 MB

Architecture and classification
- Technology node: Intel 10 nm+
- Microarchitecture: Sunny Cove
- Instruction set: x86-64
- Instructions: x86-64
- Extensions: AES-NI, CLMUL, RDRAND, SHA, TXT, SGX, MMX, SSE, SSE2, SSE3, SSSE3, SSE4.1, SSE4.2, AVX, AVX2, AVX-512, FMA3, VT-x, VT-d

Products, models, variants
- Product code name: ICL
- Brand name: Core i3; Core i5; Core i7; Xeon D
- Variant: Comet Lake (14 nm optimization)

History
- Predecessors: Cannon Lake (10 nm process); Whiskey Lake (14 nm optimization)
- Successor: Tiger Lake (10 nm optimization)

Support status
- Legacy support for iGPU

Ice Lake-SP
General information
- Launched: April 2021

Performance
- Max. CPU clock rate: 3.7 GHz

Physical specifications
- Cores: up to 40
- Socket: LGA 4189

Cache
- L1 cache: 80 KB (per core): 32 KB instructions; 48 KB data
- L2 cache: Up to 50 MB
- L3 cache: Up to 60 MB

Architecture and classification
- Technology node: Intel 10 nm+
- Microarchitecture: Sunny Cove
- Instruction set: x86-64
- Instructions: x86-64
- Extensions: AES-NI, CLMUL, RDRAND, SHA, TXT, SGX, MMX, SSE, SSE2, SSE3, SSSE3, SSE4.1, SSE4.2, AVX, AVX2, AVX-512, FMA3, VT-x, VT-d

Products, models, variants
- Brand name: Xeon Silver; Xeon Gold; Xeon Platinum; Xeon W

History
- Predecessor: Cascade Lake (14 nm)
- Successors: Same generation: Cooper Lake (14 nm, 4S/8S systems); Next generation: Sapphire Rapids

Ice Lake is Intel's codename for the 10th-generation Intel Core mobile and 3rd-generation Xeon Scalable server processors based on the Sunny Cove microarchitecture. Ice Lake represents an Architecture step in Intel's process–architecture–optimization model. Produced on the second generation of Intel's 10 nm process, 10 nm+, Ice Lake is Intel's second microarchitecture to be manufactured on the 10 nm process, following the limited launch of Cannon Lake in 2018. However, Intel altered their naming scheme in 2020 for the 10 nm process. In this new naming scheme, Ice Lake's manufacturing process is called simply 10 nm, without any appended pluses.

Ice Lake CPUs are sold together with the 14 nm Comet Lake CPUs as Intel's "10th Generation Core" product family. There are no Ice Lake desktop or high-power mobile processors; Comet Lake fulfills this role. Sunny Cove-based Xeon Scalable CPUs (codenamed "Ice Lake-SP") officially launched on April 6, 2021. Intel officially launched Xeon W-3300 series workstation processors on July 29, 2021.

Ice Lake's direct successor in mobile is Tiger Lake, a third-generation 10 nm SuperFin processor family using the new Willow Cove microarchitecture and integrated graphics based on the new Intel Xe microarchitecture. Ice Lake-SP was succeeded by Sapphire Rapids, powered by Golden Cove cores. Several mobile Ice Lake CPUs were discontinued on July 7, 2021.

== Design history and features ==
Ice Lake was designed by Intel Israel's processor design team in Haifa, Israel.

Ice Lake is built on the Sunny Cove microarchitecture. Intel released details of Ice Lake during Intel Architecture Day in December 2018, stating that the Sunny Cove core Ice Lake would be focusing on single-thread performance, new instructions, and scalability improvements. Intel stated that the performance improvements would be achieved by making the core "deeper, wider, and smarter".

Ice Lake features Intel's Gen11 graphics, increasing the number of execution units to 64, from 24 or 48 in Gen9.5 graphics, achieving over 1 TFLOPS of compute performance. Each execution unit supports 7 threads, meaning that the design has 512 concurrent pipelines. Feeding these execution units is a 3 megabyte L3 cache, a four-fold increase from Gen9.5, alongside the increased memory bandwidth enabled by LPDDR4X on low-power mobile platforms.Gen11 graphics introduces tile-based rendering. It also features Coarse Pixel Shading (CPS), which is Intel's implementation of variable-rate shading (VRS). The architecture also includes an all-new HEVC encoder design. On August 1, 2019, Intel released the specifications of Ice Lake -U and -Y CPUs. The Y-series CPUs lost their -Y suffix and m3 naming. Instead, Intel uses a trailing number before the GPU type to indicate their package power; "0" corresponds to 9 W, "5" to 15 W, and "8" to 28 W. Furthermore, the first two numbers in the model number correspond to the generation of the chip, while the third number dictates the family the CPU belongs to (i3, i5, etc.); thus, a 1035G7 would be a 10th generation Core i5 with a package power of 15 watts and a G7 GPU.

Pre-orders for laptops featuring Ice Lake CPUs started in August 2019, followed by shipments in September.

=== CPU ===
- Intel Sunny Cove CPU cores
  - On average 18% increase in IPC in comparison to 2015 Skylake running at the same frequency and memory configuration
- Dynamic Tuning 2.0 which allows the CPU to stay at turbo frequencies for longer
- TAGE-like directional branch predictor (with a global history size of 194 taken branches)
- Hardware acceleration for SHA operations (Secure Hash Algorithms)
- Intel Deep Learning Boost, used for machine learning/artificial intelligence inference acceleration
- PCI Express 4.0 on Ice Lake-SP

=== GPU ===
- Gen 11 GPU with up to 64 execution units (From 24 and 48 EU)
- 4K at 120 Hz, 5K, 8K display output
- Variable Rate Shading
- DisplayPort 1.4a with Display Stream Compression; HDMI 2.0b
- Up to 1.15 TFLOPS of computational performance
- Two HEVC 10-bit encode pipelines, either two 4K 60 Hz RGB/Y′C_{B}C_{R} 4:4:4 streams simultaneously or one 8K 30 Hz Y′C_{B}C_{R} 4:2:2
- VP9 8-bit and 10-bit hardware encoding for all supported platforms as part of Intel Quick Sync Video
- Integer and nearest neighbor image scaling
- 4th Gen IPU

=== Package ===
- 10 nm transistors (originally called 10 nm+ transistors in older naming scheme)
- New memory controller with DDR4 3200 and LPDDR4X 3733 support
- Integrated support for Wi-Fi 6 (802.11ax)
- Thunderbolt 3 support

== List of Ice Lake CPUs ==
=== Ice Lake (mobile) ===
Processor branding	Model	Cores (threads)	CPU clock (GHz)		GPU			L3 cache (MB)	TDP (W)	cTDP (W)		Price (US$)
Processor branding	Model	Cores (threads)	Base	Turbo	Series	EUs	Boost clock (GHz)	L3 cache (MB)	TDP (W)	up	down	Price (US$)
Core i7	1068NG7	4 (8)	2.3	4.1	Iris Plus	64	1.1	8 MB	28			$426
Core i7	1065G7	4 (8)	1.3	3.9	Iris Plus	64	1.1	8 MB	15	25	12	$426
Core i7	1060NG7	4 (8)	1.2	3.8	Iris Plus	64	1.1	8 MB	10			
Core i7	1060G7	4 (8)	1.0	3.8	Iris Plus	64	1.1	8 MB	9	12		
Core i5	1038NG7	4 (8)	2.0	3.8	Iris Plus	64	1.05	6 MB	28			$320
Core i5	1035G7	4 (8)	1.2	3.7	Iris Plus	64	1.05	6 MB	15	25	12	$320
Core i5	1035G4	4 (8)	1.1	3.7	Iris Plus	48	1.05	6 MB	15	25	12	$309
Core i5	1035G1	4 (8)	1.0	3.6	UHD	32	1.05	6 MB	15	25	13	$297
Core i5	1030NG7	4 (8)	1.1	3.5	Iris Plus	64	1.05	6 MB	10			
Core i5	1030G7	4 (8)	0.8	3.5	Iris Plus	64	1.05	6 MB	9	12		
Core i5	1030G4	4 (8)	0.7	3.5	Iris Plus	48	1.05	6 MB	9	12		
Core i3	1005G1	2 (4)	1.2	3.4	UHD	32	0.9	4 MB	15	25	13	$281
Core i3	1000NG4	2 (4)	1.1	3.2	Iris Plus	48	0.9	4 MB	9			
Core i3	1000G4	2 (4)	1.1	3.2	Iris Plus	48	0.9	4 MB	9	12	8	
Core i3	1000G1	2 (4)	1.1	3.2	UHD	32	0.9	4 MB	9	12	8	
Pentium	6805	2 (4)	1.1	3.0	UHD	32	0.85	4 MB	15			$161

=== Ice Lake-SP (Xeon Scalable) ===
==== Xeon Platinum series ====
Model	sSpec number	Cores (threads)	Clock rate	Turbo Boost all-core/2.0 (/max. 3.0)	L2 cache	L3 cache	TDP	Socket	I/O bus	Memory	Release date	Part number(s)	Release price (USD)
Xeon Platinum 8351N	SRKJ3 (D2)	36 (72)	2.4 GHz	3.5 GHz	36 × 1.25 MB	54 MB	225 W	LGA 4189	11.2 GT/s QPI	8×DDR4-2933	6 April 2021	CD8068904582702	$3,466 (equivalent to $4,118 in 2025)
Xeon Platinum 8352S	SRKJ8 (D2)	32 (64)	2.2 GHz	3.4 GHz	32 × 1.25 MB	48 MB	205 W	LGA 4189	11.2 GT/s QPI	8×DDR4-3200	6 April 2021	CD8068904642802	$4,632 (equivalent to $5,503 in 2025)
Xeon Platinum 8352V	SRKJ2 (D2)	36 (72)	2.1 GHz	3.5 GHz	36 × 1.25 MB	54 MB	195 W	LGA 4189	11.2 GT/s QPI	8×DDR4-2933	6 April 2021	CD8068904571501	$3,993 (equivalent to $4,744 in 2025)
Xeon Platinum 8352Y	SRKHG (D2)	32 (64)	2.2 GHz	3.4 GHz	32 × 1.25 MB	48 MB	205 W	LGA 4189	11.2 GT/s QPI	8×DDR4-3200	6 April 2021	CD8068904572401	$3,995 (equivalent to $4,747 in 2025)
Xeon Platinum 8358	SRKJ1 (D2)	32 (64)	2.6 GHz	3.4 GHz	32 × 1.25 MB	48 MB	250 W	LGA 4189	11.2 GT/s QPI	8×DDR4-3200	6 April 2021	CD8068904572302	$4,607 (equivalent to $5,474 in 2025)
Xeon Platinum 8358P	SRKJ0 (D2)	32 (64)	2.6 GHz	3.4 GHz	32 × 1.25 MB	48 MB	240 W	LGA 4189	11.2 GT/s QPI	8×DDR4-3200	6 April 2021	CD8068904599101	$4,523 (equivalent to $5,374 in 2025)
Xeon Platinum 8360Y	SRKHF (D2)	36 (72)	2.4 GHz	3.5 GHz	36 × 1.25 MB	54 MB	250 W	LGA 4189	11.2 GT/s QPI	8×DDR4-3200	6 April 2021	CD8068904571901	$5,383 (equivalent to $6,396 in 2025)
Xeon Platinum 8362	SRKY3 (D2)	32 (64)	2.8 GHz	3.6 GHz	32 × 1.25 MB	48 MB	265 W	LGA 4189	11.2 GT/s QPI	8×DDR4-3200	6 April 2021	CD8068904722404	$6,236 (equivalent to $7,409 in 2025)
Xeon Platinum 8368	SRKH8 (D2)	38 (76)	2.4 GHz	3.4 GHz	38 × 1.25 MB	57 MB	270 W	LGA 4189	11.2 GT/s QPI	8×DDR4-3200	6 April 2021	CD8068904572001	$7,214 (equivalent to $8,571 in 2025)
Xeon Platinum 8368Q	SRKHX (D2)	38 (76)	2.6 GHz	3.7 GHz	38 × 1.25 MB	57 MB	270 W	LGA 4189	11.2 GT/s QPI	8×DDR4-3200	6 April 2021	CD8068904582803	$7,719 (equivalent to $9,171 in 2025)
Xeon Platinum 8380	SRKHR (D2)	40 (80)	2.3 GHz	3.4 GHz	40 × 1.25 MB	60 MB	270 W	LGA 4189	11.2 GT/s QPI	8×DDR4-3200	6 April 2021	CD8068904572601	$9,359 (equivalent to $11,120 in 2025)

==== Xeon Gold series ====
Model	Cores (threads)	Base clock	Boost clock (1-core)	Boost clock (All-core)	L3 cache	L2 cache	TDP	Price (RCP)
6354	18 (36)	3.00 GHz	3.60 GHz		39 MB	22.50 MB	205W	$2445 US
6348	28 (56)	2.60 GHz	3.50 GHz	3.40 GHz	42 MB	35.00 MB	235W	$3072 US
6346	16 (32)	3.10 GHz	3.60 GHz		36 MB	20.00 MB	205W	$2300 US
6338N	32 (64)	2.20 GHz	3.50 GHz	2.70 GHz	48 MB	40.00 MB	185W	$2795 US
6338T	24 (48)	2.10 GHz	3.40 GHz	2.70 GHz	36 MB	30.00 MB	165W	$2742 US
6338	32 (64)	2.00 GHz	3.20 GHz	2.60 GHz	48 MB	40.00 MB	205W	$2612 US
6314U	32 (64)	2.30 GHz	3.40 GHz	2.90 GHz	48 MB	40.00 MB	205W	$2600 US
6342	24 (48)	2.80 GHz	3.50 GHz	3.30 GHz	36 MB	30.00 MB	230W	$2529 US
6334	8 (16)	3.60 GHz	3.70 GHz	3.60 GHz	18 MB	10.00 MB	165W	$2214 US
6330N	28 (56)	2.20 GHz	3.40 GHz	2.60 GHz	42 MB	35.00 MB	165W	$2029 US
6336Y	24 (48)	2.40 GHz	3.60 GHz	3.00 GHz	36 MB	30.00 MB	185W	$1977 US
6330	28 (56)	2.00 GHz	3.10 GHz	2.60 GHz	42 MB	35.00 MB	205W	$1894 US
5318S	24 (48)	2.10 GHz	3.40 GHz	2.60 GHz	36 MB	30.00 MB	165W	$1667 US
5320T	20 (40)	2.30 GHz	3.50 GHz		30 MB	25.00 MB	150W	$1727 US
5320	26 (52)	2.20 GHz	3.40 GHz	2.80 GHz	39 MB	32.50 MB	185W	$1555 US
6312U	24 (48)	2.40 GHz	3.60 GHz	3.10 GHz	36 MB	30.00 MB	185W	$1450 US
5318N	24 (48)	2.10 GHz	3.40 GHz	2.70 GHz	36 MB	30.00 MB	150W	$1375 US
6326	16 (32)	2.90 GHz	3.50 GHz	3.30 GHz	24 MB	20.00 MB	185W	$1300 US
5318Y	24 (48)	2.00 GHz	3.40 GHz	2.60 GHz	36 MB	30.00 MB	165W	$1273 US
5317	12 (24)	3.00 GHz	3.60 GHz	3.40 GHz	18 MB	15.00 MB	150W	$950 US
5315Y	8 (16)	3.20 GHz	3.60 GHz	3.50 GHz	12 MB	10.00 MB	140W	$895 US

==== Xeon Silver series ====
Model	Cores (threads)	Base clock	Boost clock (1-core)	Boost clock (All-core)	L3 cache	L2 cache	TDP	Price (RCP)
4316	20 (40)	2.30 GHz	3.40 GHz	2.80 GHz	30 MB	25.00 MB	150W	$1002 US
4314	16 (32)	2.40 GHz	3.40 GHz	2.90 GHz	24 MB	20.00 MB	135W	$694 US
4310T	10 (20)	2.30 GHz	3.40 GHz	2.90 GHz	15 MB	13.75 MB	105W	$555 US
4310	12 (24)	2.10 GHz	3.30 GHz	2.70 GHz	18 MB	12.50 MB	120W	$501 US
4309Y	8 (16)	2.80 GHz	3.60 GHz	3.40 GHz	12 MB	10.00 MB	105W	$501 US

=== Ice Lake-D ===
Intel announced the next generation of Xeon D, codenamed Ice Lake-D in April 2021. Intel official launched the Xeon D D-2700 series and D-1700 series CPUs at MWC 2022. Xeon D D-2800 series and D-1800 series were announced on Dec 14, 2023.

=== Workstation processors ===
"Ice Lake-W3300" (10 nm)

- PCI Express lanes: 64
- Supports up to 16 DIMMs of DDR4 memory, maximum 4 TB.

Model number	Spec number	Cores (threads)	Frequency	Turbo Boost all-core/2.0 (/max. 3.0)	L2 cache	L3 cache	TDP	Socket	I/O bus	Memory	Release date	Part number(s)	Release price (USD)
Xeon W-3375	SRKSX (D2)	38 (76)	2.5 GHz	?/4.0 GHz	38 × 1.25 MB	57 MB	270 W	LGA 4189	DMI 3.0	8× DDR4-3200	29 July 2021	CD8068904691401	$4,499 (equivalent to $5,345 in 2025)
Xeon W-3365	SRKSW (D2)	32 (64)	2.7 GHz	?/4.0 GHz	32 × 1.25 MB	48 MB	270 W	LGA 4189	DMI 3.0	8× DDR4-3200	29 July 2021	CD8068904691303	$3,499 (equivalent to $4,157 in 2025)
Xeon W-3345	SRKSU (D2)	24 (48)	3 GHz	?/4.0 GHz	24 × 1.25 MB	36 MB	250 W	LGA 4189	DMI 3.0	8× DDR4-3200	29 July 2021	CD8068904691101	$2,499 (equivalent to $2,969 in 2025)
Xeon W-3335	SRKWS (M1)	16 (32)	3.4 GHz	?/4.0 GHz	16 × 1.25 MB	24 MB	250 W	LGA 4189	DMI 3.0	8× DDR4-3200	29 July 2021	CD8068904708401	$1,299 (equivalent to $1,543 in 2025)
Xeon W-3323	SRKWT (M1)	12 (24)	3.5 GHz	?/3.9 GHz	12 × 1.25 MB	21 MB	220 W	LGA 4189	DMI 3.0	8× DDR4-3200	29 July 2021	CD8068904708502	$949 (equivalent to $1,128 in 2025)

== See also ==
- List of Intel CPU microarchitectures
- 10th generation Intel Core
  - Comet Lake

Atom (ULV)		Node name	Pentium/Core						
Microarch.	Step	Node name	Microarch.	Step					
		600 nm	P6	Pentium Pro (133 MHz)					
		500 nm	P6	Pentium Pro (150 MHz)					
		350 nm	P6	Pentium Pro (166–200 MHz)					
		350 nm	P6	Klamath					
		250 nm	P6	Deschutes					
		250 nm	P6	Katmai	NetBurst				
		180 nm	P6	Coppermine	Willamette				
		130 nm	P6	Tualatin	Northwood				
		130 nm	Pentium M	Banias	Northwood		NetBurst(HT)		NetBurst(×2)
		90 nm	Pentium M	Dothan	Prescott	⇨	Prescott‑2M	⇨	Smithfield
		90 nm	Pentium M	Dothan	~~Tejas~~	→	⇩	→	~~Cedarmill (Tejas)~~
		65 nm	Pentium M	Yonah	~~Nehalem (NetBurst)~~		Cedar Mill	⇨	Presler
		65 nm	Core	Merom	4 cores on mainstream desktop, DDR3 introduced				
Bonnell	Bonnell	45 nm	Core	Penryn					
Bonnell	Bonnell	45 nm	Nehalem	Nehalem	HT reintroduced, integrated MC, PCH; L3-cache introduced, 256 KB L2-cache/core				
Bonnell	Saltwell	32 nm	Nehalem	Westmere	Introduced GPU on same package and AES-NI				
Bonnell	Saltwell	32 nm	Sandy Bridge	Sandy Bridge	On-die ring bus, no more non-UEFI motherboards				
Silvermont	Silvermont	22 nm	Sandy Bridge	Ivy Bridge					
Silvermont	Silvermont	22 nm	Haswell	Haswell	Fully integrated voltage regulator				
Silvermont	Airmont	14 nm	Haswell	Broadwell					
Silvermont	Airmont	14 nm	Skylake	Skylake	DDR4 introduced on mainstream desktop				
Goldmont		14 nm	Skylake	Kaby Lake					
Goldmont		14 nm	Skylake	Coffee Lake	6 cores on mainstream desktop				
Goldmont		14 nm	Skylake	Amber Lake	Mobile-only				
Goldmont Plus		14 nm	Skylake	Whiskey Lake	Mobile-only				
Goldmont Plus		14 nm	Skylake	Coffee Lake Refresh	8 cores on mainstream desktop				
Goldmont Plus		14 nm	Skylake	Comet Lake	10 cores on mainstream desktop				
Goldmont Plus		14 nm	Sunny Cove	Cypress Cove (Rocket Lake)	Backported Sunny Cove microarchitecture for 14 nm				
Tremont		10 nm	Skylake	Palm Cove (Cannon Lake)	Mobile-only				
Tremont		10 nm	Sunny Cove	Sunny Cove (Ice Lake)	512 KB L2-cache/core				
Tremont		10 nm	Sunny Cove	Willow Cove (Tiger Lake)	X^{e} graphics engine				
Gracemont		Intel 7 (10 nm ESF)	Golden Cove	Golden Cove (Alder Lake)	Hybrid, DDR5, PCIe 5.0				
Gracemont		Intel 7 (10 nm ESF)	Golden Cove	Raptor Cove (Raptor Lake)					
Crestmont		Intel 4	Redwood Cove	Meteor Lake	Mobile-only; NPU, chiplet architecture				
Crestmont		Intel 3	Redwood Cove	Arrow Lake-U					
Skymont		TSMC N3B	Lion Cove	Lunar Lake	Low power mobile only (9–30 W)				
Skymont		TSMC N3B	Lion Cove	Arrow Lake					
Darkmont		Intel 18A	Cougar Cove	Panther Lake					
Arctic Wolf		Intel 18A and/or TSMC N2P	Coyote Cove	Nova Lake					
