= Raptor Lake =

Line of Intel microprocessors released in 2022

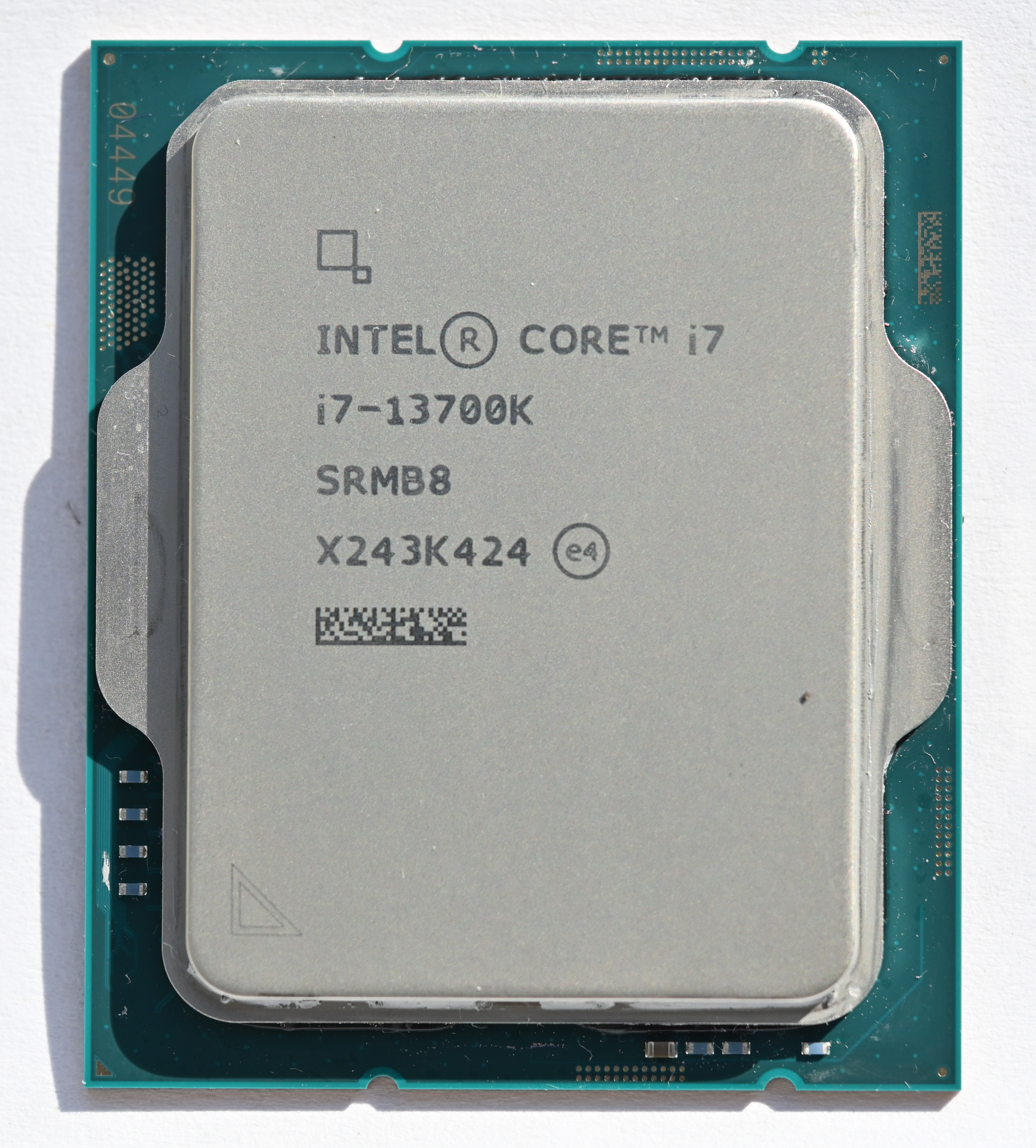
- Intel Core i7-13700K

General information
- Launched: October 20, 2022; 4 years ago
- Marketed by: Intel
- Designed by: Intel
- Common manufacturer: Intel
- CPUID code: B0671
- Product code: 80715

Performance
- Max. CPU clock rate: Up to 6.2 GHz (P-cores); Up to 4.5 GHz (E-cores)
- DMI speeds: 8x 16 GT/s

Physical specifications
- Cores: Up to 8 P-cores; Up to 16 E-cores
- Memory (RAM): Up to 256 GB (Note: 128 GB by default. A BIOS update must be applied to install 256 GB.); Up to dual-channel DDR5-5600 and 89.6 GB/s bandwidth with ECC support in some models; Up to dual-channel LPDDR5X-6400 in mobile CPUs (excluding HX series)
- GPU: Intel Xe-based integrated graphics (up to 96 execution units)
- Packages: Flip-chip land grid array (FC-LGA); Flip-chip ball grid array (FC-BGA)
- Sockets: Desktop/Server: LGA 1700; Mobile: BGA 1744; BGA 1792; Desktop replacement: BGA 1964

Cache
- L1 cache: 80 KB per P-core (32 KB instructions + 48 KB data); 96 KB per E-core (64 KB instructions + 32 KB data)
- L2 cache: 1.25 or 2 MB per P-core; 2 or 4 MB per E-core cluster
- L3 cache: Up to 36 MB shared

Architecture and classification
- Technology node: Intel 7 (previously known as 10ESF)
- Microarchitecture: Raptor Cove (P-cores); Golden Cove (P-cores); Gracemont (E-cores)
- Instruction set: x86
- Instructions: x86-64
- Extensions: AES-NI, CLMUL, RDRAND, MMX, SSE, SSE2, SSE3, SSSE3, SSE4.1, SSE4.2, AVX, AVX2, FMA3, AVX-VNNI, SHA, TXT, VT-x, VT-d

Products, models, variants
- Product code name: RPL
- Models: Raptor Lake-S; Raptor Lake-U; Raptor Lake-P; Raptor Lake-PX; Raptor Lake-H; Raptor Lake-HX; Raptor Lake-S Refresh; Raptor Lake-U Refresh; Raptor Lake-HX Refresh
- Brand names: Intel Core; Intel Processor; Intel Xeon E-2400
- Variant: Emerald Rapids (server)

History
- Predecessors: Alder Lake (desktop and mobile); Rocket Lake (low-end servers); Twin Lake (low-end mobile)
- Successors: Arrow Lake (desktop and mobile replacement); Meteor Lake (mobile)

Support status
- Legacy support for iGPU

Raptor Lake is Intel's codename for the 13th and 14th generations of Intel Core-branded microprocessors as well as some Core Series 1 and 2 processors. It is based on a hybrid architecture, utilizing Raptor Cove performance cores and Gracemont efficient cores. Some lower-end SKUs branded as Raptor Lake are based on Alder Lake, with Golden Cove P-cores and Alder Lake-equivalent cache and memory configurations. Like Alder Lake, Raptor Lake is fabricated using Intel's Intel 7 process. Raptor Lake features up to 24 cores (8 performance cores plus 16 efficiency cores) and 32 threads and is socket compatible with Alder Lake systems (LGA 1700, BGA 1744, BGA 1964). Like earlier generations, Raptor Lake processors also need accompanying chipsets.

Raptor Lake CPUs contain a clock tree circuit vulnerable to accelerated aging and permanent damage at elevated voltages. The BIOS code and microcode used with these CPUs supplied improperly high voltages, resulting in instability as the circuit degrades over time. Intel claims that aging issues have been since fixed in the latest BIOS and microcode patches, which can be installed by updating the motherboard's BIOS. Once damaged by overvoltage, these CPUs cannot be fixed by a patch and must be replaced. Intel has extended the warranty of Raptor Lake CPUs affected by the high voltage BIOS from 3 years to 5 years.

In lower end processors, there are several models that use dies manufactured with the previous generation Alder Lake architecture. Despite their last generation-architecture, Intel's official names for these processors are "Raptor Lake" and "Raptor Lake Refresh". This codename introduced the "Intel Processor" branding for Intel's low-end processors, replacing Celeron and Pentium.

== History ==
Raptor Lake launched on October 20, 2022. On January 3, 2023, at CES 2023, Intel announced additional desktop CPUs and mobile CPUs. The 14th generation was launched on October 17, 2023. Raptor Lake's microarchitecture was developed by Intel's R&D center (IDC) in Haifa, Israel.

In September 2022, an Intel spokesman revealed that Raptor Lake was created to benefit from process improvements before Meteor Lake arrives since the next microarchitecture was likely to be delayed.

Raptor Lake competes with AMD's Ryzen 7000 series that was launched about one month earlier on September 27, 2022.

The 14th-generation Raptor Lake Refresh is the last processor family to use the old "Core i" branding scheme in use since 2008. The Raptor Lake-U Refresh series is the first processor family to use the new "Core 3/5/7" branding scheme introduced in mid 2023.

On December 14, 2023, Intel announced the Raptor Cove-based Xeon E-2400 series for entry-level servers.

== Features ==
Raptor Lake die from an i9-13900K

Core i9-13900K labeled die shot

=== CPU ===
- Up to 24 cores:
  - Up to 8 Raptor Cove performance cores (P-core)
  - Up to 16 Gracemont efficient cores (E-core) in 4-core clusters
- L2 cache for the P-core increased to maximum 2 MB and for the E-core cluster to maximum 4 MB
- Up to 36 MB shared L3 cache

=== GPU ===
- Up to 96 execution units (EUs)
- Intel Xe-LP microarchitecture
- Up to 1.65 GHz frequency
- Up to 4 displays

=== I/O ===
- Up to DDR5-5600 and LPDDR5X-6400
- Dual-channel memory; up to 2 DIMMs per channel (up to 4 DIMMs total), up to 256 GB
- Support XMP 3.0
- Up to 28 PCI Express 5.0 lanes including 8 dedicated to Direct Media Interface
  - from CPU: x16 PCIe 5.0, x4 PCIe 4.0, x8 DMI 4.0 (16 GB/s total)
  - from Platform Controller Hub (PCH): x8 PCIe 4.0
- Integrated Thunderbolt 4 and WiFi 6E support
  - Supported via PCH on desktop processors
  - Directly supported by CPU on non-HX mobile processors
  - No support on HX mobile processors, could be added via external controller

=== Technology ===
- Third-generation Intel SuperFin transistors
- Increased P- and E-cores maximum frequencies
- Increased power efficiency

== List of 13th-generation Raptor Lake processors ==
=== Desktop processors ===
==== Raptor Lake-S ====
On September 27, 2022, at their Innovation event, Intel officially revealed six unlocked Raptor Lake SKUs launching for desktop on October 20, 2022. The highest-end Raptor Lake SKU, the 13900KS, which can hit up to 6.0 GHz at stock configuration, debuted in 2023.

Common features of Raptor Lake desktop CPUs:

- Socket: LGA 1700.
- Memory support:
  - All models support up to 128 GB of RAM and up to 256 GB of DDR5 RAM after a BIOS upgrade.
  - All models support DDR4 and DDR5 in dual-channel mode. (Note: Technically dual-channel DDR5 can be considered "quad-channel", as there are 4 × 32-bit memory buses, rather than 2 × 64-bit as is the case with DDR4. See DDR5 SDRAM § DIMMs versus memory chips for more info.)
  - All models support up to DDR4-3200 or DDR5-4800. The i5-13600 (K/KF/T) and all models above it support DDR5 speeds up to 5600 MT/s with max 2 DIMMs slotted, 4400 MT/s if 4 DIMMs are slotted.
- All models provide 28 PCI Express lanes:
  - 16 PCIe 5.0 lanes
  - 4 PCIe 4.0 lanes
  - 8 DMI lanes
- Models without the F suffix feature either of the following integrated UHD Graphics GPUs, all with base frequency of 300 MHz:
  - UHD Graphics 770 with 32 execution units, or
  - UHD Graphics 730 with 24 execution units
- Max Turbo Power: the maximum sustained (> 1 s) power dissipation of the processor as limited by current and/or temperature controls. Instantaneous power may exceed Maximum Turbo Power for short durations (≤ 10 ms). Maximum Turbo Power is configurable by system vendor and can be system specific.
- CPUs in **bold** below feature vPro Enterprise and UDIMM ECC memory support only when paired with a motherboard based on the W680 chipset. Other SKUs do not support ECC memory at all.

Suffixes to denote:

- T – Low power (TDP reduced to 35 W)
- F – No integrated graphics
- K – Unlocked clock multiplier
- KF – Unlocked clock multiplier + No integrated graphics
- KS – Unlocked clock multiplier + Special edition

Alder Lake and Raptor Lake mixed models:

- 13400, 13400F

Alder Lake models:

- 13600, 13600T, 13500, 13500T, 13490F, 13400T, 13100, 13100F, 13100T

Processor branding	Model	Cores (threads)		Clock rate (GHz)						GPU		Smart cache	TDP		Release date	Price (USD) (Note: Price is Recommended Customer Price (RCP) at launch. RCP is the trade price that processors are sold by Intel to retailers and OEMs. Actual MSRP for consumers is higher.)
Processor branding	Model	Cores (threads)		Base		Turbo Boost				Model	Max. freq. (GHz)	Smart cache	TDP		Release date	Price (USD)
Processor branding	Model	Cores (threads)		Base		2.0		3.0	TVB	Model	Max. freq. (GHz)	Smart cache	TDP		Release date	Price (USD)
Processor branding	Model	P	E	P	E	P	E	P	P	Model	Max. freq. (GHz)	Smart cache	Base	Turbo	Release date	Price (USD)
Core i9	**13900KS**	8 (16)	16 (16)	3.2	2.4	5.4	4.3	5.8	6.0	UHD 770	1.65	36 MB	150 W	253 W	Jan 12, 2023	$699
Core i9	**13900K**	8 (16)	16 (16)	3.0	2.0	5.4	4.3	5.7	5.8	UHD 770	1.65	36 MB	125 W	253 W	Oct 20, 2022	$589
Core i9	13900KF	8 (16)	16 (16)	3.0	2.0	5.4	4.3	5.7	5.8	—N/a		36 MB	125 W	253 W	Oct 20, 2022	$564
Core i9	**13900**	8 (16)	16 (16)	2.0	1.5	5.2	4.2	5.5	5.6	UHD 770	1.65	36 MB	65 W	219 W	Jan 3, 2023	$549
Core i9	13900F	8 (16)	16 (16)	2.0	1.5	5.2	4.2	5.5	5.6	—N/a		36 MB	65 W	219 W	Jan 3, 2023	$524
Core i9	**13900E**	8 (16)	16 (16)	1.8	1.3	5.2	4.0	—N/a	—N/a	UHD 770	1.65	36 MB	65 W	–	Q1'23	$554
Core i9	**13900TE**	8 (16)	16 (16)	1.0	0.8	5.0	3.9	—N/a	—N/a	UHD 770	1.65	36 MB	35 W	–	Q1'23	$554
Core i9	**13900T**	8 (16)	16 (16)	1.1	0.8	5.1	3.9	5.3	—N/a	UHD 770	1.65	36 MB	35 W	106 W	Jan 3, 2023	$549
Core i7	13790F	8 (16)	8 (8)	2.1	1.5	5.1	4.1	5.2	—N/a	—N/a		33 MB	65 W	219 W	Feb 8, 2023	China exclusive
Core i7	**13700K**	8 (16)	8 (8)	3.4	2.5	5.4	4.2	5.4	—N/a	UHD 770	1.6	30 MB	125 W	253 W	Oct 20, 2022	$409
Core i7	13700KF	8 (16)	8 (8)	3.4	2.5	5.4	4.2	5.4	—N/a	—N/a		30 MB	125 W	253 W	Oct 20, 2022	$384
Core i7	**13700**	8 (16)	8 (8)	2.1	1.5	5.1	4.1	5.2	—N/a	UHD 770	1.6	30 MB	65 W	219 W	Jan 3, 2023	$384
Core i7	13700F	8 (16)	8 (8)	2.1	1.5	5.1	4.1	5.2	—N/a	—N/a		30 MB	65 W	219 W	Jan 3, 2023	$359
Core i7	**13700E**	8 (16)	8 (8)	1.9	1.3	5.1	3.9	—N/a	—N/a	UHD 770	1.6	30 MB	65 W	–	Q1'23	$390
Core i7	**13700TE**	8 (16)	8 (8)	1.1	0.8	4.8	3.6	—N/a	—N/a	UHD 770	1.6	30 MB	35 W	–	Q1'23	$390
Core i7	**13700T**	8 (16)	8 (8)	1.4	1.0	4.8	3.6	4.9	—N/a	UHD 770	1.6	30 MB	35 W	106 W	Jan 3, 2023	$384
Core i5	**13600K**	6 (12)	8 (8)	3.5	2.6	5.1	3.9	—N/a	—N/a	UHD 770	1.5	24 MB	125 W	181 W	Oct 20, 2022	$319
Core i5	13600KF	6 (12)	8 (8)	3.5	2.6	5.1	3.9	—N/a	—N/a	—N/a		24 MB	125 W	181 W	Oct 20, 2022	$294
Core i5	**13600 (Note: These are likely Alder Lake processors since they do not include increased L2 caches.)**	6 (12)	8 (8)	2.7	2.0	5.0	3.7	—N/a	—N/a	UHD 770	1.55	24 MB	65 W	154 W	Jan 3, 2023	$255
Core i5	**13600T**	6 (12)	8 (8)	1.8	1.3	4.8	3.4	—N/a	—N/a	UHD 770	1.55	24 MB	35 W	92 W	Jan 3, 2023	
Core i5	**13500**	6 (12)	8 (8)	2.5	1.8	4.8	3.5	—N/a	—N/a	UHD 770	1.55	24 MB	65 W	154 W	Jan 3, 2023	$232
Core i5	**13500T**	6 (12)	8 (8)	1.6	1.2	4.6	3.2	—N/a	—N/a	UHD 770	1.55	24 MB	35 W	92 W	Jan 3, 2023	
Core i5	**13490F**	6 (12)	4 (4)	2.5	1.8	4.8	3.5	—N/a	—N/a	—N/a		24 MB	65 W	148 W	Feb 8, 2023	China exclusive
Core i5	13400	6 (12)	4 (4)	2.5	1.8	4.6	3.3	—N/a	—N/a	UHD 730	1.55	20 MB	65 W	148 W	Jan 3, 2023	$221
Core i5	13400F	6 (12)	4 (4)	2.5	1.8	4.6	3.3	—N/a	—N/a	—N/a		20 MB	65 W	148 W	Jan 3, 2023	$196
Core i5	13400T	6 (12)	4 (4)	1.3	1.0	4.4	3.0	—N/a	—N/a	UHD 730	1.55	20 MB	35 W	82 W	Jan 3, 2023	$221
Core i3	13100	4 (8)	—N/a	3.4	—N/a	4.5	—N/a	—N/a	—N/a	UHD 730	1.5	12 MB	60 W	110 W	Jan 3, 2023	$134
Core i3	13100F	4 (8)	—N/a	3.4	—N/a	4.5	—N/a	—N/a	—N/a	—N/a		12 MB	58 W	110 W	Jan 3, 2023	$109
Core i3	13100T	4 (8)	—N/a	2.5	—N/a	4.2	—N/a	—N/a	—N/a	UHD 730	1.5	12 MB	35 W	69 W	Jan 3, 2023	$134

=== Mobile processors ===
All mobile processors except for the HX series support the following types of memory: DDR5-5200, DDR4-3200, LPDDR5X-6400, LPDDR4X-4267. The HX processors only support: DDR5-4800 (DDR5-5600 for i7-13850HX and above), DDR4-3200.

The processors are connected to PCHs using an OPIO 2.0 x8 interface, except for the HX series which uses a DMI 4.0 x8 interface. Except for the HX series, the processor and PCH are packaged together on a multi-chip package.

The HX series uses 45x37.5mm BGA 1964, and the other mobile processors use 25x50mm BGA 1744, on a Type 3 or Type 4 HDI.

==== Raptor Lake-HX ====
The HX processors are desktop processors repurposed for mobile use, with all models unlocked for overclocking.

- CPUs in **bold** support vPro Enterprise and UDIMM ECC memory support when paired with the WM790 mobile workstation chipset.
- i7-13650HX and above feature Turbo Boost 3.0, which is at the same speed as Turbo Boost 2.0.
- i9-13980HX supports Thermal Velocity Boost to 5.6 GHz

Alder Lake and Raptor Lake mixed models:

- 13700HX, 13450HX

Alder Lake models:

- 13600HX, 13500HX

Processor branding	Model	Cores (threads)		Base clock (GHz)		Turbo Boost (GHz)		UHD Graphics		Smart cache	TDP		Price (USD)
Processor branding	Model	P	E	P	E	P	E	EUs	Boost clock (GHz)	Smart cache	Base (cTDP)	Turbo	Price (USD)
Core i9	13980HX	8 (16)	16 (16)	2.2	1.6	5.6	4.0	32	1.65	36 MB	55 W (45 W)	157 W	$668
Core i9	**13950HX**	8 (16)	16 (16)	2.2	1.6	5.5	4.0	32	1.65	36 MB	55 W (45 W)	157 W	$590
Core i9	13900HX	8 (16)	16 (16)	2.2	1.6	5.4	3.9	32	1.65	36 MB	55 W (45 W)	157 W	$668
Core i7	**13850HX**	8 (16)	12 (12)	2.1	1.5	5.3	3.8	32	1.6	30 MB	55 W (45 W)	157 W	$428
Core i7	13700HX	8 (16)	8 (8)	2.1	1.5	5.0	3.7	32	1.55	30 MB	55 W (45 W)	157 W	$485
Core i7	13650HX	6 (12)	8 (8)	2.6	1.9	4.9	3.6	16	1.55	24 MB	55 W (45 W)	157 W	$485
Core i5	**13600HX**	6 (12)	8 (8)	2.6	1.9	4.8	3.6	32	1.5	24 MB	55 W (45 W)	157 W	$284
Core i5	13500HX	6 (12)	8 (8)	2.5	1.8	4.7	3.5	32	1.5	24 MB	55 W (45 W)	157 W	$326
Core i5	13450HX	6 (12)	4 (4)	2.4	1.8	4.6	3.4	16	1.45	20 MB	55 W (45 W)	157 W	$326

==== Raptor Lake-H ====
- The iGPU of CPUs in italic is UHD, not Iris Xe.
- i7-13620H and above feature Turbo Boost 3.0, which is at the same speed as Turbo Boost 2.0.

Processor branding	Model	Cores (threads)		Base clock (GHz)		Turbo Boost (GHz)		UHD/Iris Xe Graphics		Smart cache	TDP		Price (USD)
Processor branding	Model	P	E	P	E	P	E	EUs	Boost clock (GHz)	Smart cache	Base (cTDP)	Turbo	Price (USD)
Core i9	13900HK	6 (12)	8 (8)	2.6	1.9	5.4	4.1	96	1.5	24 MB	45 W (35 W)	115 W	$697
Core i9	13900H	6 (12)	8 (8)	2.6	1.9	5.4	4.1	96	1.5	24 MB	45 W (35 W)	115 W	$617
Core i7	13800H	6 (12)	8 (8)	2.5	1.8	5.2	4.0	96	1.5	24 MB	45 W (35 W)	115 W	$457
Core i7	13700H	6 (12)	8 (8)	2.4	1.8	5.0	3.7	96	1.5	24 MB	45 W (35 W)	115 W	$502
Core i7	13620H	6 (12)	4 (4)	2.4	1.8	4.9	3.6	64	1.5	24 MB	45 W (35 W)	115 W	$502
Core i5	13600H	4 (8)	8 (8)	2.8	2.1	4.8	3.6	80	1.5	18 MB	45 W (35 W)	95 W	$311
Core i5	13500H	4 (8)	8 (8)	2.6	1.9	4.7	3.5	80	1.45	18 MB	45 W (35 W)	95 W	$342
Core i5	13420H	4 (8)	4 (4)	2.1	1.5	4.6	3.4	48	1.4	12 MB	45 W (35 W)	95 W	$342

==== Raptor Lake-PX ====
These CPUs use BGA1792.

Processor branding	Model	Cores (threads)		Base clock (GHz)		Turbo Boost (GHz)		Iris Xe Graphics		Smart cache	TDP		Price (USD)
Processor branding	Model	P	E	P	E	P	E	EUs	Boost clock (GHz)	Smart cache	Base (cTDP)	Turbo	Price (USD)
Core i9	13905H	6 (12)	8 (8)	2.6	1.9	5.4	4.1	96	1.5	24 MB	45 W (35 W)	115 W	$697
Core i7	13705H	6 (12)	8 (8)	2.4	1.8	5.0	3.7	96	1.5	24 MB	45 W (35 W)	115 W	$502
Core i5	13505H	4 (8)	8 (8)	2.6	1.9	4.7	3.5	80	1.45	18 MB	45 W (35 W)	115 W	$342

==== Raptor Lake-P ====
Processor branding	Model	Cores (threads)		Base clock (GHz)		Turbo Boost (GHz)		Iris Xe Graphics		Smart cache	TDP		Price (USD)
Processor branding	Model	P	E	P	E	P	E	EUs	Boost clock (GHz)	Smart cache	Base (cTDP)	Turbo	Price (USD)
Core i7	1370P	6 (12)	8 (8)	1.9	1.4	5.2	3.9	96	1.5	24 MB	28 W (20 W)	64 W	$438
Core i7	1360P	4 (8)	8 (8)	2.2	1.6	5.0	3.7	96	1.5	18 MB	28 W (20 W)	64 W	$480
Core i5	1350P	4 (8)	8 (8)	1.9	1.4	4.7	3.5	80	1.5	12 MB	28 W (20 W)	64 W	$320
Core i5	1340P	4 (8)	8 (8)	1.9	1.4	4.6	3.4	80	1.45	12 MB	28 W (20 W)	64 W	$353

==== Raptor Lake-U ====
The iGPU of CPUs in italic is UHD, not Iris Xe.

Processor branding	Model	Cores (threads)		Base clock (GHz)		Turbo Boost (GHz)		UHD/Iris Xe Graphics		Smart cache	TDP		Price (USD)
Processor branding	Model	P	E	P	E	P	E	EUs	Boost clock (GHz)	Smart cache	Base (cTDP)	Turbo	Price (USD)
Core i7	1365U	2 (4)	8 (8)	1.8	1.3	5.2	3.9	96	1.3	12 MB	15 W (12 W)	55 W	$426
Core i7	1355U	2 (4)	8 (8)	1.7	1.2	5.0	3.7	96	1.3	12 MB	15 W (12 W)	55 W	$469
Core i5	1345U	2 (4)	8 (8)	1.6	1.2	4.7	3.5	80	1.25	12 MB	15 W (12 W)	55 W	$309
Core i5	1335U	2 (4)	8 (8)	1.3	0.9	4.6	3.4	80	1.25	12 MB	15 W (12 W)	55 W	$340
Core i5	1334U	2 (4)	8 (8)	1.3	0.9	4.6	3.4	80	1.25	12 MB	15 W (12 W)	55 W	$340
Core i3	1315U (with IPU)	2 (4)	4 (4)	1.2	0.9	4.5	3.3	64	1.25	10 MB	15 W (12 W)	55 W	$309
Core i3	1305U	1 (2)	4 (4)	1.6	1.2	4.5	3.3	64	1.25	10 MB	15 W (12 W)	55 W	$309
Intel; Processor	U300	1 (2)	4 (4)	1.2		4.4	3.3	48	1.1	8 MB	15 W (12 W)	55 W	$193

== List of 14th-generation Raptor Lake processors ==
=== Desktop processors ===
==== Raptor Lake-S Refresh ====
An iterative refresh of Raptor Lake-S desktop processors were launched as 14th-generation Core processors on October 17, 2023. Raptor Lake-S Refresh uses the same B0 and C0 silicon steppings as Raptor Lake with no physical changes. The most major change with Raptor Lake-S Refresh is that one fewer E-core cluster is disabled in silicon for Core i7 SKUs.

CPUs in bold below feature UDIMM ECC memory support only when paired with a motherboard based on the W680 chipset according to each respective Intel Ark product page.

- Alder Lake and Raptor Lake mixed models:
  - 14400, 14400F
- Alder Lake models:
  - 14500, 14500T, 14490F, 14400T, 14100, 14100F, 14100T, 300, 300T

Branding	Model	Cores (threads)		Clock rate (GHz)						GPU		Smart cache	TDP		Released	Price (USD)
Branding	Model	Cores (threads)		Base		Turbo Boost				Model	Max. freq. (GHz)	Smart cache	TDP		Released	Price (USD)
Branding	Model	Cores (threads)		Base		2.0		3.0	TVB	Model	Max. freq. (GHz)	Smart cache	TDP		Released	Price (USD)
Branding	Model	P	E	P	E	P	E	P	P	Model	Max. freq. (GHz)	Smart cache	Base	Turbo	Released	Price (USD)
Core i9	**14900KS**	8 (16)	16 (16)	3.2	2.4	5.7	4.5	5.9	6.2	UHD 770	1.65	36 MB	150 W	253 W	Mar 14, 2024	$689
Core i9	**14900K**	8 (16)	16 (16)	3.2	2.4	5.6	4.4	5.8	6.0	UHD 770	1.65	36 MB	125 W	253 W	Oct 17, 2023	$589
Core i9	14900KF	8 (16)	16 (16)	3.2	2.4	5.6	4.4	5.8	6.0	—N/a		36 MB	125 W	253 W	Oct 17, 2023	$564
Core i9	**14900**	8 (16)	16 (16)	2.0	1.5	5.4	4.3	5.6	5.8	UHD 770	1.65	36 MB	65 W	219 W	Jan 8, 2024	$549
Core i9	14900F	8 (16)	16 (16)	2.0	1.5	5.4	4.3	5.6	5.8	—N/a		36 MB	65 W	219 W	Jan 8, 2024	$524
Core i9	**14900T**	8 (16)	16 (16)	1.1	0.8	5.1	4.0	5.5	—N/a	UHD 770	1.65	36 MB	35 W	106 W	Jan 8, 2024	$549
Core i7	14790F	8 (16)	8 (8)	2.1	1.5	5.3	4.2	5.4	—N/a	—N/a		36 MB	65 W	219 W	Jan 15, 2024	China exclusive
Core i7	**14700K**	8 (16)	12 (12)	3.4	2.5	5.5	4.3	5.6	—N/a	UHD 770	1.6	33 MB	125 W	253 W	Oct 17, 2023	$409
Core i7	14700KF	8 (16)	12 (12)	3.4	2.5	5.5	4.3	5.6	—N/a	—N/a		33 MB	125 W	253 W	Oct 17, 2023	$384
Core i7	**14700**	8 (16)	12 (12)	2.1	1.5	5.3	4.2	5.4	—N/a	UHD 770	1.6	33 MB	65 W	219 W	Jan 8, 2024	$384
Core i7	14700F	8 (16)	12 (12)	2.1	1.5	5.3	4.2	5.4	—N/a	—N/a		33 MB	65 W	219 W	Jan 8, 2024	$359
Core i7	**14700T**	8 (16)	12 (12)	1.3	0.9	5.0	3.7	5.2	—N/a	UHD 770	1.6	33 MB	35 W	106 W	Jan 8, 2024	$384
Core i5	**14600K**	6 (12)	8 (8)	3.5	2.6	5.3	4.0	—N/a	—N/a	UHD 770	1.55	24 MB	125 W	181 W	Oct 17, 2023	$319
Core i5	14600KF	6 (12)	8 (8)	3.5	2.6	5.3	4.0	—N/a	—N/a	—N/a		24 MB	125 W	181 W	Oct 17, 2023	$294
Core i5	**14600**	6 (12)	8 (8)	2.7	2.0	5.2	3.9	—N/a	—N/a	UHD 770	1.55	24 MB	65 W	154 W	Jan 8, 2024	$255
Core i5	**14600T**	6 (12)	8 (8)	1.8	1.3	5.1	3.6	—N/a	—N/a	UHD 770	1.55	24 MB	35 W	92 W	Jan 8, 2024	$255
Core i5	**14500**	6 (12)	8 (8)	2.6	1.9	5.0	3.7	—N/a	—N/a	UHD 770	1.55	24 MB	65 W	154 W	Jan 8, 2024	$232
Core i5	**14500T**	6 (12)	8 (8)	1.7	1.2	4.8	3.4	—N/a	—N/a	UHD 770	1.55	24 MB	35 W	92 W	Jan 8, 2024	$232
Core i5	14490F	6 (12)	4 (4)	2.8	2.1	4.9	3.7	—N/a	—N/a	—N/a		24 MB	65 W	148 W	Jan 15, 2024	China exclusive
Core i5	14400	6 (12)	4 (4)	2.5	1.8	4.7	3.5	—N/a	—N/a	UHD 730	1.55	20 MB	65 W	148 W	Jan 8, 2024	$221
Core i5	14400F	6 (12)	4 (4)	2.5	1.8	4.7	3.5	—N/a	—N/a	—N/a		20 MB	65 W	148 W	Jan 8, 2024	$196
Core i5	14400T	6 (12)	4 (4)	1.5	1.1	4.5	3.2	—N/a	—N/a	UHD 730	1.55	20 MB	35 W	82 W	Jan 8, 2024	$221
Core i3	14100	4 (8)	—N/a	3.5	—N/a	4.7	—N/a	—N/a	—N/a	UHD 730	1.5	12 MB	60 W	110 W	Jan 8, 2024	$134
Core i3	14100F	4 (8)	—N/a	3.5	—N/a	4.7	—N/a	—N/a	—N/a	—N/a		12 MB	58 W	110 W	Jan 8, 2024	$109
Core i3	14100T	4 (8)	—N/a	2.7	—N/a	4.4	—N/a	—N/a	—N/a	UHD 730	1.5	12 MB	35 W	69 W	Jan 8, 2024	$134
Intel; Processor	300	2 (4)	—N/a	3.9	—N/a	—N/a	—N/a	—N/a	—N/a	UHD 710	1.45	6 MB	46 W	—N/a	Jan 8, 2024	$82
Intel; Processor	300T	2 (4)	—N/a	3.4	—N/a	—N/a	—N/a	—N/a	—N/a	UHD 710	1.45	6 MB	35 W	—N/a	Jan 8, 2024	$82

=== Embedded processors ===
==== Raptor Lake-E Refresh ====
Embedded Raptor Lake Refresh CPUs lack E-Cores and contain only P-Cores.

Processor branding	Model	Cores (threads)	Clock rate (GHz)		GPU		Smart cache	TDP	Price (USD)
Processor branding	Model	Cores (threads)	Base	Turbo	Model	Max. freq. (GHz)	Smart cache	TDP	Price (USD)
Core i9	14901KE	8 (16)	3.8	5.8	UHD 770	1.65	36 MB	125 W	$557
Core i9	14901E	8 (16)	2.8	5.6	UHD 770	1.65	36 MB	65 W	$557
Core i9	14901TE	8 (16)	2.3	5.5	UHD 770	1.65	36 MB	45 W	$557
Core i7	14701E	8 (16)	2.6	5.4	UHD 770	1.65	33 MB	65 W	$392
Core i7	14701TE	8 (16)	2.1	5.2	UHD 770	1.65	33 MB	45 W	$392
Core i5	14501E	6 (12)	3.3	5.2	UHD 770	1.55	24 MB	65 W	$239
Core i5	14501TE	6 (12)	2.2	5.1	UHD 770	1.55	24 MB	45 W	$239
Core i5	14401E	6 (12)	2.5	4.7	UHD 770	1.55	24 MB	65 W	$228
Core i5	14401TE	6 (12)	2.0	4.5	UHD 770	1.55	24 MB	45 W	$228

=== Mobile processors ===
==== Raptor Lake-HX Refresh ====
An iterative refresh of Raptor Lake-HX mobile processors, called the 14th generation of Intel Core, was launched on January 9, 2024.

Processor branding	Model	Cores (threads)		Base clock (GHz)		Turbo Boost (GHz)		UHD Graphics		Smart cache	TDP		Release date	Price (USD)
Processor branding	Model	P	E	P	E	P	E	EUs	Boost clock (GHz)	Smart cache	Base (cTDP)	Turbo	Release date	Price (USD)
Core i9	14900HX	8 (16)	16 (16)	2.2	1.6	5.8	4.1	32	1.65	36 MB	55 W (45 W)	157 W	Q1'24	$679
Core i7	14700HX	8 (16)	12 (12)	2.1	1.5	5.5	3.9	32	1.6	33 MB	55 W (45 W)	157 W	Q1'24	$495
Core i7	14650HX	8 (16)	8 (8)	2.2	1.6	5.2	3.7	16	1.6	30 MB	55 W (45 W)	157 W	Q1'24	
Core i5	14500HX	6 (12)	8 (8)	2.6	1.9	4.9	3.5	32	1.55	24 MB	55 W (45 W)	157 W	Q1'24	$337
Core i5	14450HX	6 (12)	4 (4)	2.4	1.8	4.8	3.5	16	1.5	20 MB	55 W (45 W)	157 W	Q1'24	

=== Server processors ===
- CPUs support 2-channel DDR5-4800 ECC memory
- 48 PCI Express lanes total between CPU and chipset
  - CPU: x16 PCIe 5.0, x4 PCIe 4.0
  - C260 PCH: x20 PCIe 4.0, x8 PCIe 3.0
- LGA1700 socket
- A refresh/rebrand of the Xeon E-2400 entry-server line, marketed as the Intel Xeon 6 6300 series, was launched on February 24, 2025.

Processor branding	Model	Cores (threads)	Clock rate (GHz)		Smart cache	TDP	Release date	Price (USD)
Processor branding	Model	Cores (threads)	Base	Turbo	Smart cache	TDP	Release date	Price (USD)
Xeon E	2488	8 (16)	3.2	5.6	24 MB	95 W	Q4'23	$606
Xeon E	2478	8 (16)	2.8	5.2	24 MB	80 W	Q4'23	$556
Xeon E	2468	8 (16)	2.6	5.2	24 MB	65 W	Q4'23	$426
Xeon E	2486	6 (12)	3.5	5.6	18 MB	95 W	Q4'23	$506
Xeon E	2456	6 (12)	3.3	5.1	18 MB	80 W	Q4'23	$375
Xeon E	2436	6 (12)	2.9	4.8	18 MB	65 W	Q4'23	$319
Xeon E	2434	4 (8)	3.4	5.0	12 MB	55 W	Q4'23	$281
Xeon E	2414	4 (4)	2.6	4.5	12 MB	55 W	Q4'23	$213
Xeon 6; 6300 series	6369P	8 (16)	3.3	5.7	24 MB	95 W	Q1'25	$606
Xeon 6; 6300 series	6357P	8 (16)	3.0	5.4	24 MB	80 W	Q1'25	$556
Xeon 6; 6300 series	6353P	8 (16)	2.7	5.4	24 MB	65 W	Q1'25	$426
Xeon 6; 6300 series	6349P	6 (12)	3.6	5.7	18 MB	95 W	Q1'25	$506
Xeon 6; 6300 series	6337P	6 (12)	3.5	5.3	18 MB	80 W	Q1'25	$375
Xeon 6; 6300 series	6333P	6 (12)	3.1	5.2	18 MB	65 W	Q1'25	$319
Xeon 6; 6300 series	6325P	4 (8)	3.5	5.2	12 MB	55 W	Q1'25	$281
Xeon 6; 6300 series	6315P	4 (4)	2.8	4.7	12 MB	55 W	Q1'25	$213

== List of Core Series 1 processors ==
=== Mobile processors ===
These Raptor Lake-based processors are branded as "Core Series 1" vs. the Meteor Lake-based ones which are branded "Core Ultra Series 1."

==== Raptor Lake-U Refresh ====
Processor branding	Model	Cores (threads)		Base clock (GHz)		Turbo Boost (GHz)		Intel Graphics		Smart cache	TDP		Release date	Price (USD)
Processor branding	Model	P	E	P	E	P	E	EUs	Boost clock (GHz)	Smart cache	Base (cTDP)	Turbo	Release date	Price (USD)
Core 7	150U	2 (4)	8 (8)	1.8	1.2	5.4	4.0	96	1.3	12 MB	15 W (12 W)	55 W	Q1'24	
Core 5	120U	2 (4)	8 (8)	1.4	0.9	5.0	3.8	80	1.25	12 MB	15 W (12 W)	55 W	Q1'24	$340
Core 3	100U (with IPU)	2 (4)	4 (4)	1.2	0.9	4.7	3.3	64	1.25	10 MB	15 W (12 W)	55 W	Q1'24	

== List of Core Series 2 processors ==
=== Mobile processors ===
These Raptor Lake-based processors are branded as "Core Series 2", Unlike Arrow Lake's "Core Ultra Series 2".

==== Raptor Lake-U Re-refresh ====
Processor branding	Model	Cores (threads)		Base clock (GHz)		Turbo Boost (GHz)		Intel Graphics		Smart cache	TDP		Release date	Price (USD)
Processor branding	Model	P	E	P	E	P	E	EUs	Boost clock (GHz)	Smart cache	Base (cTDP)	Turbo	Release date	Price (USD)
Core 7	250U	2 (4)	8 (8)	1.8	1.2	5.4	4.0	96	1.3	12 MB	15 W (12 W)	55 W	Q1'25	$426
Core 5	220U	2 (4)	8 (8)	1.4	0.9	5.0	3.8	80	1.3	12 MB	15 W (12 W)	55 W	Q1'25	$309

==== Raptor Lake-H Re-refresh ====
Processor branding	Model	Cores (threads)		Base clock (GHz)		Turbo Boost (GHz)		UHD/Iris Xe Graphics		Smart cache	TDP		Release date	Price (USD)
Processor branding	Model	P	E	P	E	P	E	EUs	Boost clock (GHz)	Smart cache	Base (cTDP)	Turbo	Release date	Price (USD)
Core 9	270H	6 (12)	8 (8)	2.7	2.0	5.8	4.1	96	1.55	24 MB	45 W (35 W)	115 W	Q1'25	$697
Core 7	250H	6 (12)	8 (8)	2.5	1.8	5.4	4.0	96	1.55	24 MB	45 W (35 W)	115 W	Q1'25	$502
Core 7	240H	6 (12)	4 (4)	2.5	1.8	5.2	4.0	64	1.55	24 MB	45 W (35 W)	115 W	Q1'25	$502
Core 5	220H	4 (8)	8 (8)	2.7	2.0	4.9	3.7	80	1.5	18 MB	45 W (35 W)	95 W	Q1'25	$342
Core 5	210H	4 (8)	4 (4)	2.2	1.6	4.8	3.6	48	1.4	12 MB	45 W (35 W)	95 W	Q1'25	$342

== Instability and degradation issue ==
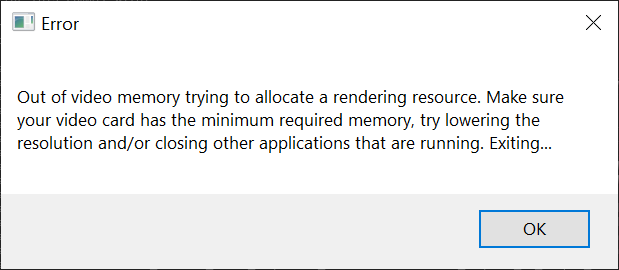
An example error message of a program crashing that occur on systems with the affected CPUs, which led to an initial assumption of it being an issue related to graphic cards or drivers

In February 2024, reports had begun surfacing of users of K-versions of the 13th- and 14th-generation Core i7 and i9 desktop CPUs commonly experiencing crashing issues in certain workload scenarios, such as video games that use DirectX 12, and HandBrake. The issue was initially attributed to GeForce graphics drivers; however, in a driver update published on April 13, 2024, Nvidia acknowledged the instability problem as being associated with the Intel 13th- and 14th-generation CPUs, and that owners of them should contact Intel customer support for further assistance. Some users and game developers worked around the problem by applying lower power limits, undervolting or underclocking the CPU. Similar failures in some 13th and 14th gen HX-version Intel laptop processors were reported, but were attributed to "common symptoms stemming from a broad range of potential software and hardware issues" by Intel.

=== Analysis ===
Intel refers to the issue as a "Vmin shift instability"; in other words, the minimum voltage required to operate the chip is increased due to silicon degradation. By April 18, 2024, Intel had a root-cause investigation underway.

==== First round of patching ====
By April 2024 it was believed by some hardware reviewers to be silicon degradation from power limits being set too high by the motherboard's default settings. Shortly thereafter, motherboard manufacturers began rolling out BIOS updates which provide an "Intel Baseline Profile" preset in the overclocking menu, which intends to enforce the power limits of the official Intel specification. Hardware reviewer Hardwareluxx had found that there is an average performance loss of 9% across a number of applications with the Baseline profile, compared to the motherboard's default profile, when tested using the i9-14900K. The BIOS update is also not expected to "fix" any already-compromised CPUs.

In addition, TechSpot found that the Intel Baseline Profile is inconsistent between the motherboard manufacturers (Gigabyte and Asus in particular), with Gigabyte setting a PL2 of 188 W, while Asus sets a PL2 of 253 W which is the official Intel specification. TechSpot further criticized Intel, stating that they had claimed in the past several years that the motherboard manufacturers not adhering to Intel's official specification for power limits were considered normal and "within spec".

Despite the attempted Intel Baseline Profile fix through BIOS updates, instances of crashes still continue to be reported as of July 2024, now largely affecting game-server providers equipped with server-grade LGA1700 motherboards. One datacenter service provider reported that it was switching some of its customers to AMD-powered game servers because of the severity of the problems and the lack of prompt fixes. Gaming laptops have also been found to be affected, although to a lesser degree.

==== Microcode updates ====
In May 2024 Intel identified a bug within the Enhanced Thermal Velocity Boost (eTVB) algorithm, where the CPU's frequency is not properly reduced under high temperature. This would, in theory, also contribute to accelerated degradation. Intel does not however consider it the root cause of the problem, only it may have been a contributing factor. This is fixed in microcode version 0x125 (June 2024).

Again, Intel confirmed that there is no fix to the issue if it already affects a CPU, and any damage to the CPU is permanent. Intel has decided not to halt sales or recall any units.

Though owners of high-end chips like the Core i9-13900K and Core i9-14900K were the most frequently affected by the crashing issue, Intel says that any 13th- or 14th-generation desktop CPU with a base power of 65 W or higher could ultimately be affected in July 2024.

In August 2024, Intel identified a problem in the Serial Voltage Identification (SVID) portion of the microcode where overly high voltages are requested by the CPU. This is fixed in microcode version 0x129. Intel subsequently contacted motherboard manufacturers to produce BIOS updates containing the new microcode, which they did in the same month. Users were advised to apply these updates and use the "Intel Default Settings" in their BIOS configuration. Also, Intel’s released a list of affected CPUs, which includes K- and KF-series CPUs from the 13th- and 14th-generation Core i9, Core i7, and Core i5 families, and also non-K CPUs in the Core i9 and Core i7 families. But slower, more budget-oriented chips like the Core i5-13400 aren’t listed.

In September 2024, Intel identified a further issue in both microcode and BIOS code, where idling the CPU would request an overly high voltage and speed up aging. The physical "root cause" is identified as a "clock tree circuit within the IA core which is particularly vulnerable to reliability aging under elevated voltage and temperature". The fix is released as microcode 0x12B and BIOS updates are again made. No performance impact is expected according to Intel measurements.

In May 2025, Intel identified some edge cases not addressed by the 0x12B fix surrounding unresolved degradation in "systems continuously running for multiple days with low-activity and lightly-threaded workloads". The new microcode version is 0x12F. Intel measures no performance difference compared to 0x12B.

=== Two-year warranty extension for certain models ===
On August 2, 2024, Intel announced they would extend warranty for certain retail (boxed) 13th- and 14th-generation Core CPUs by two years. On August 5, 2024, the company announced they would extend warranty to tray (OEM) CPUs as well. The extended warranty will cover the following models, which are affected by Vmin Shift Instability issue:

Processor models with warranty extension
13th-generation Intel Core	14th-generation Intel Core
i9-13900KS	i9-14900KS
i9-13900K	i9-14900K
i9-13900KF	i9-14900KF
i9-13900	i9-14900
i9-13900F	i9-14900F
i7-13790F	i7-14790F
i7-13700K	i7-14700K
i7-13700KF	i7-14700KF
i7-13700	i7-14700
i7-13700F	i7-14700F
i5-13600K	i5-14600K
i5-13600KF	i5-14600KF

In 2026, Mozilla released Firefox 151.0.1 to fix crashes on Intel Raptor Lake CPUs (13th and 14th gen). The issue was caused by incorrect 16-bit dist values in the browser’s compression code, linked to Intel CPU bugs RPL050 and RPL060. Intel’s microcode updates had already reduced crashes, but the browser update provided a stable fix.

== See also ==
- Emerald Rapids, Intel's 5th-generation Xeon server processors based on Raptor Cove microarchitecture and Intel 7 process
- List of Intel CPU microarchitectures

== Notes ==
Atom (ULV)		Node name	Pentium/Core						
Microarch.	Step	Node name	Microarch.	Step					
		600 nm	P6	Pentium Pro (133 MHz)					
		500 nm	P6	Pentium Pro (150 MHz)					
		350 nm	P6	Pentium Pro (166–200 MHz)					
		350 nm	P6	Klamath					
		250 nm	P6	Deschutes					
		250 nm	P6	Katmai	NetBurst				
		180 nm	P6	Coppermine	Willamette				
		130 nm	P6	Tualatin	Northwood				
		130 nm	Pentium M (P6)	Banias	Northwood		NetBurst(HT)		NetBurst(×2)
		90 nm	Pentium M (P6)	Dothan	Prescott	⇨	Prescott‑2M	⇨	Smithfield
		90 nm	Pentium M (P6)	Dothan	~~Tejas~~	→	⇩	→	~~Cedarmill (Tejas)~~
		65 nm	Pentium M (P6)	Yonah	~~Nehalem (NetBurst)~~		Cedar Mill	⇨	Presler
		65 nm	Core	Merom	4 cores on mainstream desktop, DDR3 introduced				
Bonnell	Bonnell	45 nm	Core	Penryn					
Bonnell	Bonnell	45 nm	Nehalem	Nehalem	HT reintroduced, integrated MC, PCH; L3-cache introduced, 256 KB L2-cache/core				
Bonnell	Saltwell	32 nm	Nehalem	Westmere	Introduced GPU on same package and AES-NI				
Bonnell	Saltwell	32 nm	Sandy Bridge	Sandy Bridge	On-die ring bus, no more non-UEFI motherboards				
Silvermont	Silvermont	22 nm	Sandy Bridge	Ivy Bridge					
Silvermont	Silvermont	22 nm	Haswell	Haswell	Fully integrated voltage regulator				
Silvermont	Airmont	14 nm	Haswell	Broadwell					
Silvermont	Airmont	14 nm	Skylake	Skylake	DDR4 introduced on mainstream desktop				
Goldmont		14 nm	Skylake	Kaby Lake					
Goldmont		14 nm	Skylake	Coffee Lake	6 cores on mainstream desktop				
Goldmont		14 nm	Skylake	Amber Lake	Mobile-only				
Goldmont Plus		14 nm	Skylake	Whiskey Lake	Mobile-only				
Goldmont Plus		14 nm	Skylake	Coffee Lake Refresh	8 cores on mainstream desktop				
Goldmont Plus		14 nm	Skylake	Comet Lake	10 cores on mainstream desktop				
Goldmont Plus		14 nm	Sunny Cove	Cypress Cove (Rocket Lake)	Backported Sunny Cove microarchitecture for 14 nm				
Tremont		10 nm	Skylake	Palm Cove (Cannon Lake)	Mobile-only				
Tremont		10 nm	Sunny Cove	Sunny Cove (Ice Lake)	512 KB L2-cache/core				
Tremont		10 nm	Sunny Cove	Willow Cove (Tiger Lake)	X^{e} graphics engine				
Gracemont		Intel 7 (10 nm ESF)	Golden Cove	Golden Cove (Alder Lake)	Hybrid, DDR5, PCIe 5.0				
Gracemont		Intel 7 (10 nm ESF)	Golden Cove	Raptor Cove (Raptor Lake)					
Crestmont		Intel 4	Redwood Cove	Meteor Lake	Mobile-only; NPU, chiplet architecture				
Crestmont		Intel 3	Redwood Cove	Arrow Lake-U					
Skymont		TSMC N3B	Lion Cove	Lunar Lake	Low power mobile only (9–30 W)				
Skymont		TSMC N3B	Lion Cove	Arrow Lake					
Darkmont		Intel 18A	Cougar Cove	Panther Lake					
Arctic Wolf		Intel 18A and/or TSMC N2P	Coyote Cove	Nova Lake					
