= Golden Cove =

CPU microarchitecture by Intel

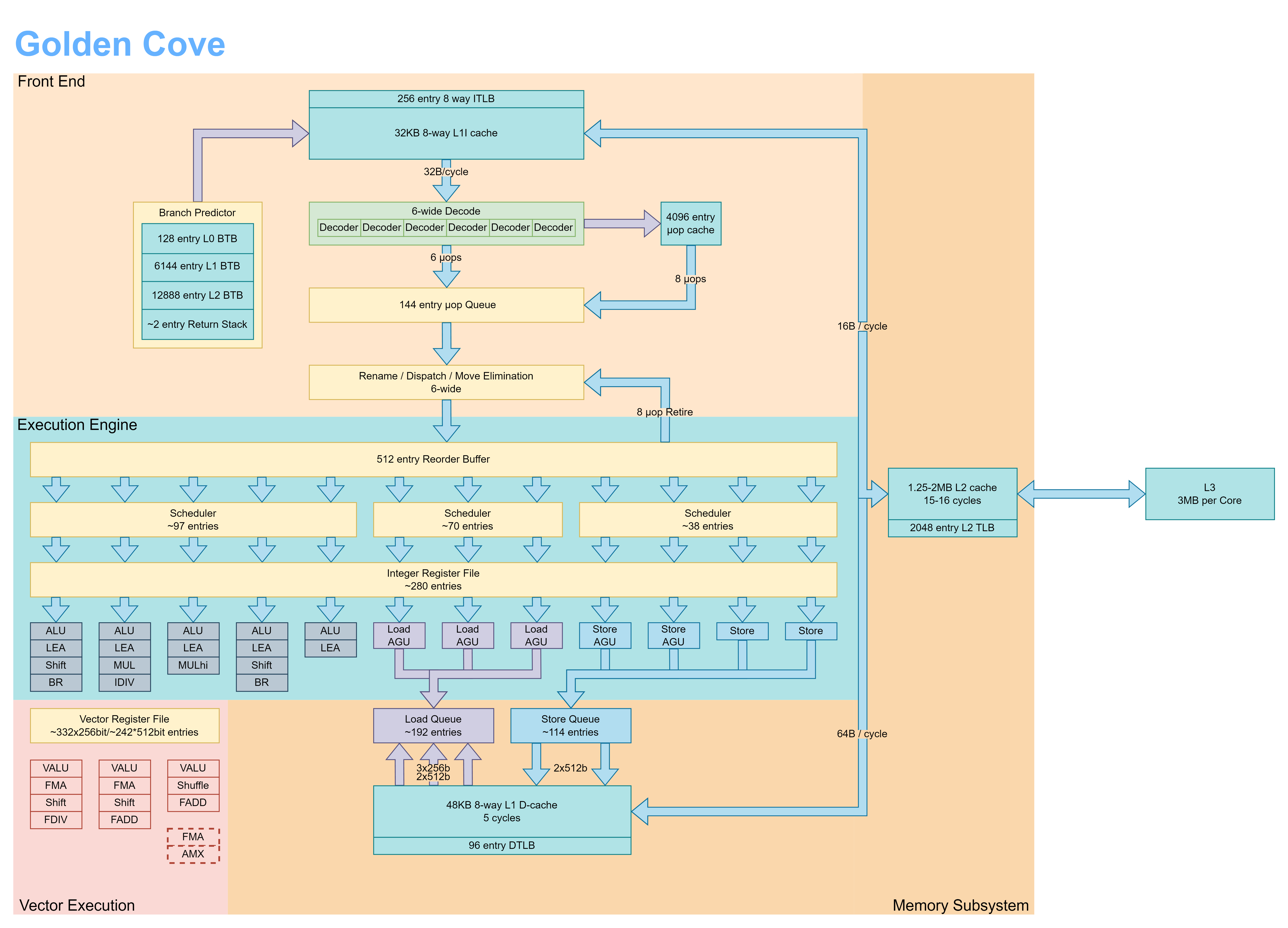

General information
- Launched: November 4, 2021; 4 years ago
- Designed by: Intel
- Common manufacturer: Intel

Performance
- Max. CPU clock rate: 1.0 GHz to 5.5 GHz

Cache
- L1 cache: 80 KB per core: 32 KB instructions; 48 KB data
- L2 cache: Per core: 1.25 MB (client); 2 MB (server)

Architecture and classification
- Technology node: Intel 7 (previously known as 10ESF)
- Instruction set: x86, x86-64
- Extensions: AES-NI, CLMUL, RDRAND, SHA, TXT, MMX, SSE, SSE2, SSE3, SSSE3, SSE4.1, SSE4.2, AVX, AVX2, FMA3, AVX-512, AVX-VNNI, TSX, VT-x, VT-d

Products, models, variants
- Product code names: Alder Lake (client); Sapphire Rapids (server, workstation)

History
- Predecessors: Sunny Cove, 1S and 2S servers, 10 nm; Skylake, 4S and 8S servers, 14 nm; Willow Cove, mobile, 10 nm; Cypress Cove, desktop, 14 nm
- Successor: Raptor Cove

Golden Cove is a codename for a CPU microarchitecture developed by Intel and released in November 2021. It succeeds four microarchitectures: Sunny Cove, Skylake, Willow Cove, and Cypress Cove. It is fabricated using Intel's Intel 7 process node, previously referred to as 10 nm Enhanced SuperFin (10ESF).

The microarchitecture is used in the high-performance cores (P-core) of the 12th-generation Intel Core processors (codenamed "Alder Lake") and fourth-generation Xeon Scalable server processors (codenamed "Sapphire Rapids").

== History and features ==
Intel first unveiled Golden Cove during their Architecture Day 2020, with further details released at the same event in August 2021. Similar to Skylake, Golden Cove was described by Intel as a major update to the core microarchitecture, with Intel stating that it would "allow performance for the next decade of compute". Intel also described Golden Cove as the largest microarchitectural upgrade to the Core family in a decade, touting a 19% increase in instructions per cycle (IPC) over Cypress Cove. At the event in 2021, Intel revealed the Gracemont and Golden Cove architectures would both be bundled in a hybrid architecture into its Alder Lake CPUs for desktops and laptops. It was described as "the successor to Intel's 10-nm Sunny Cove microarchitecture." It was also announced that the Golden Cove cores would support hyper-threading, which allows two threads to run on one core. "P-cores" based on Golden Cove stand for "performance", while "E-cores" based on Gracemont stand for "efficient."

In August 2021, Golden Cove design followed "the Willow Cove core in Tiger Lake, the Sunny Cove core in Ice Lake, and the derivative Cypress Cove core in Rocket Lake."

Succeeding Willow Cove, in 2021 the Golden Cove was described as competing against AMD's Zen 3 and Zen 4-based processors. Golden Cove is based on the 10 nm Enhanced SuperFin node by Intel, which was later renamed to Intel 7. When modifying Willow Cove, writes Hardware Times, Intel announced in 2021 that both Golden Cove and Gracemont "expanded the back and front-end, improved the out-of-order execution (OoO) capabilities, and focused more on power efficiency and real-world performance."

In January 2022, TechRadar noted that the upcoming Intel Alder Lake-P processors, mobile variants of Alder Lake with Golden Cove, could possibly use up to "six Golden Cove cores with 12 threads alongside eight Gracemont cores with eight threads," noting other permutations were also possible. In April 2022, it was reported that Raptor Lake, a "refresh" of Alder Lake, might utilize the Golden Cove and Gracemont cores. It was also reported in April 2022 that Sapphire Rapids would utilize Golden Cove cores.

== Improvements ==
According to AnandTech in August 2021, "Intel sees the Golden Cove as a major step-function update, with massive revamps of the fundamental building blocks of the CPU, going as far as calling it as allowing performance for the next decade of compute. AnandTech in August 2021 also wrote that the last similar level of upgrades to Intel's "core front-end" was Sunny Cove, as compared to Willow Cove and Cypress Cove, which unlike Golden Cove "were more iterative designs focusing on the memory subsystem." Golden Cove was described as having "gigantic changes to the microarchitecture’s front-end", with Intel describing those changes as the largest upgrades to microarchitecture in a decade, since Skylake.

The P-core Golden Cove microarchitecture supports six-wide decode, higher than the prior four, and has split the execution ports to allow for more operations to execute at once, enabling higher IPC and ILP from workflow that can take advantage. Usually a wider decode consumes a lot more power, but Intel says that its micro-op cache (now 4K) and front-end are improved enough that the decode engine spends 80% of its time power gated."

Intel describes a number of improvements over its predecessor, Sunny Cove.

- New 6-wide partial instruction decoder (from 4-wide in previous microarchitectures) with the ability to fetch up to 32 bytes of instructions per cycle (from 16)
- Wider 6-wide microarchitecture but removed complex decoder (compared to previous 5-wide 4:1:1:1:1 design)
- μOP cache size increased to 4K entries (up from 2.25K)
- 12 execution ports (up from 10)
- Larger out-of-order instruction window compared to Sunny Cove, with the re-order buffer (ROB) size increased from 352 to 512 entries
- Larger vector/floating-point register file, which was increased from 224 to 332 entries
- 192 load and 114 store queues (from 128 and 72 in Sunny Cove)
- 1.25 MB per core L2 cache size for consumer processors and 2 MiB per core for server variants
- 3MB per core L3 cache, shared among all the cores including E-cores on Alder Lake
- Dedicated floating-point adders
- New instruction set extensions:
  - PTWRITE
  - User-mode wait (WAITPKG): TPAUSE, UMONITOR, UMWAIT
  - Architectural last branch records (LBRs)
  - Hypervisor-managed linear address translation (HLAT)
  - SERIALIZE
  - Enhanced Hardware Feedback Interface (EHFI) and HRESET
  - AVX-VNNI
  - AVX-512 with AVX512-FP16
  - In server Sapphire Rapids CPUs:
    - CLDEMOTE
    - TSX with TSXLDTRK

== Products ==
The microarchitecture is used in the high-performance cores of the 12th generation of Intel Core hybrid processors (codenamed "Alder Lake") and the fourth generation of Xeon scalable processors (codenamed "Sapphire Rapids").

== Raptor Cove ==
Raptor Cove
General information
- Launched: October 22, 2022; 3 years ago
- Marketed by: Intel
- Designed by: Intel
- Common manufacturer: Intel

Performance
- Max. CPU clock rate: 1.2 GHz to 6.2 GHz

Physical specifications
- Cores: 1-64

Cache
- L1 cache: 80 KB per core: 32 KB instructions; 48 KB data
- L2 cache: 2 MB per core
- L3 cache: 3 MB per core

Architecture and classification
- Technology node: Intel 7 (previously known as 10ESF)
- Instruction set: x86, x86-64
- Extensions: AES-NI, CLMUL, RDRAND, SHA, TXT, MMX, SSE, SSE2, SSE3, SSSE3, SSE4, SSE4.1, SSE4.2, AVX, AVX2, FMA3, AVX-512, AVX-VNNI, TSX, VT-x, VT-d

Products, models, variants
- Core names: Raptor Lake (client); Emerald Rapids (server)

History
- Predecessor: Golden Cove
- Successors: Redwood Cove, Lion Cove

Raptor Cove, released on October 20, 2022 with Raptor Lake processors, is a refresh of the Golden Cove microarchitecture with the following changes:

- Boost frequency up to 6.2 GHz
- 2 MB L2 cache, up from 1.25 MB on the mainstream desktop variant of Golden Cove. The server variant of the previous Golden Cove core already had 2 MB L2 cache per core.
- New dynamic prefetch algorithm

Raptor Cove is also used in the Emerald Rapids server processors.

Since Raptor Cove is basically identical to Golden Cove, 13th / 14th Gen Core models (such as i7-13700, i7-14700, i9-14900K) come with B0 stepping use Raptor Cove exclusively while others with different steppings (such as C0, H0, J0 and Q0) still use Golden Cove. Notably, some models come with multiple steppings (such as i5-13400F. i5-14400F and i7-13700HX) are using a different microarchitecture but they are selling at the same time.

== See also ==
- List of Intel CPU microarchitectures

Atom (ULV)		Node name	Pentium/Core						
Microarch.	Step	Node name	Microarch.	Step					
		600 nm	P6	Pentium Pro (133 MHz)					
		500 nm	P6	Pentium Pro (150 MHz)					
		350 nm	P6	Pentium Pro (166–200 MHz)					
		350 nm	P6	Klamath					
		250 nm	P6	Deschutes					
		250 nm	P6	Katmai	NetBurst				
		180 nm	P6	Coppermine	Willamette				
		130 nm	P6	Tualatin	Northwood				
		130 nm	Pentium M	Banias	Northwood		NetBurst(HT)		NetBurst(×2)
		90 nm	Pentium M	Dothan	Prescott	⇨	Prescott‑2M	⇨	Smithfield
		90 nm	Pentium M	Dothan	~~Tejas~~	→	⇩	→	~~Cedarmill (Tejas)~~
		65 nm	Pentium M	Yonah	~~Nehalem (NetBurst)~~		Cedar Mill	⇨	Presler
		65 nm	Core	Merom	4 cores on mainstream desktop, DDR3 introduced				
Bonnell	Bonnell	45 nm	Core	Penryn					
Bonnell	Bonnell	45 nm	Nehalem	Nehalem	HT reintroduced, integrated MC, PCH; L3-cache introduced, 256 KB L2-cache/core				
Bonnell	Saltwell	32 nm	Nehalem	Westmere	Introduced GPU on same package and AES-NI				
Bonnell	Saltwell	32 nm	Sandy Bridge	Sandy Bridge	On-die ring bus, no more non-UEFI motherboards				
Silvermont	Silvermont	22 nm	Sandy Bridge	Ivy Bridge					
Silvermont	Silvermont	22 nm	Haswell	Haswell	Fully integrated voltage regulator				
Silvermont	Airmont	14 nm	Haswell	Broadwell					
Silvermont	Airmont	14 nm	Skylake	Skylake	DDR4 introduced on mainstream desktop				
Goldmont		14 nm	Skylake	Kaby Lake					
Goldmont		14 nm	Skylake	Coffee Lake	6 cores on mainstream desktop				
Goldmont		14 nm	Skylake	Amber Lake	Mobile-only				
Goldmont Plus		14 nm	Skylake	Whiskey Lake	Mobile-only				
Goldmont Plus		14 nm	Skylake	Coffee Lake Refresh	8 cores on mainstream desktop				
Goldmont Plus		14 nm	Skylake	Comet Lake	10 cores on mainstream desktop				
Goldmont Plus		14 nm	Sunny Cove	Cypress Cove (Rocket Lake)	Backported Sunny Cove microarchitecture for 14 nm				
Tremont		10 nm	Skylake	Palm Cove (Cannon Lake)	Mobile-only				
Tremont		10 nm	Sunny Cove	Sunny Cove (Ice Lake)	512 KB L2-cache/core				
Tremont		10 nm	Sunny Cove	Willow Cove (Tiger Lake)	X^{e} graphics engine				
Gracemont		Intel 7 (10 nm ESF)	Golden Cove	Golden Cove (Alder Lake)	Hybrid, DDR5, PCIe 5.0				
Gracemont		Intel 7 (10 nm ESF)	Golden Cove	Raptor Cove (Raptor Lake)					
Crestmont		Intel 4	Redwood Cove	Meteor Lake	Mobile-only; NPU, chiplet architecture				
Crestmont		Intel 3	Redwood Cove	Arrow Lake-U					
Skymont		TSMC N3B	Lion Cove	Lunar Lake	Low power mobile only (9–30 W)				
Skymont		TSMC N3B	Lion Cove	Arrow Lake					
Darkmont		Intel 18A	Cougar Cove	Panther Lake					
Arctic Wolf		Intel 18A and/or TSMC N2P	Coyote Cove	Nova Lake					
