= Tiger Lake =

Intel microprocessor family

General information
- Launched: Chip-only availability: September 2, 2020; 6 years ago Pre-installed-availability: October 2020; 5 years ago
- Discontinued: January 26, 2024; 2 years ago
- Product code: 80690

Performance
- Max. CPU clock rate: 5.0 GHz

Physical specifications
- Cores: 2–8
- GPU: Intel Xe-based integrated graphics
- Socket: BGA 1449, BGA 1787

Cache
- L1 cache: 80 KB per core (32 instructions + 48 data)
- L2 cache: 1.25 MB per core
- L3 cache: Up to 24 MB, shared

Architecture and classification
- Technology node: Intel 10 nm SuperFin (10SF) process
- Microarchitecture: Willow Cove
- Instruction set: x86-64
- Instructions: x86-64
- Extensions: AES-NI, CLMUL, RDRAND, SHA, TXT, MMX, SSE, SSE2, SSE3, SSSE3, SSE4.1, SSE4.2, AVX, AVX2, AVX-512, FMA3, VT-x, VT-d

Products, models, variants
- Product code name: TGL
- Brand name: Celeron; Pentium Gold; Core i3; Core i5; Core i7; Core i9; Xeon W

History
- Predecessors: Mobile: Ice Lake; Mobile and desktop: Comet Lake
- Successor: Alder Lake

Support status
- Legacy support for iGPU

Tiger Lake is Intel's codename for the 11th generation Intel Core mobile processors based on the Willow Cove Core microarchitecture, manufactured using Intel's third-generation 10 nm process node known as 10SF ("10 nm SuperFin"). Tiger Lake replaces the Ice Lake family of mobile processors, representing an optimization step in Intel's process–architecture–optimization model.

Tiger Lake processors launched on September 2, 2020. They are part of the Tiger Lake-U family (however, they end with the suffixes -G4 and -G7 instead of -U) and include dual-core and quad-core 9 W (7–15 W) TDP and 15 W (12–28 W) TDP models. They power 2020 Intel Evo laptops. The quad-core 96 EU die measures 13.6 × 10.7 mm (146.1 mm^{2}), which is 19.2% wider than the 11.4 × 10.7 mm (122.5 mm^{2}) quad-core 64 EU Ice Lake die. The 8-core 32 EU die used in Tiger Lake-H is around 190 mm^{2}. Laptops based on Tiger Lake started to sell in October 2020.

The Tiger Lake-H35 processors were launched on January 11, 2021. These quad-core processors are designed for "ultraportable gaming" laptops with 28-35 W TDP. Intel officially launched the 11th generation Intel Core-H series and Xeon W-11000M series on May 11, 2021 and announced the 11th generation Intel Core Tiger Lake Refresh series (1195G7 and 1155G7) on May 30, 2021.

== Features ==
=== CPU ===
- Intel Willow Cove CPU cores
- TAGE-like directional branch predictor (with a global history size of 194 taken branches)
- Indirect branch tracking and CET shadow stack
- Intel Key Locker
- AVX-512 extension support for most models

=== GPU ===
- Intel Xe-LP ("Gen12") GPU with up to 96 execution units (from Ice Lake's 64), also released as a standalone GPU, the DG1
- Support for FP64 was removed
- Fixed-function hardware decoding for HEVC 12-bit, 4:2:2/4:4:4; VP9 12-bit 4:4:4 and AV1 8K 10-bit 4:2:0
- Support for a single 8K 12-bit HDR display or two 4K 10-bit HDR displays
- Hardware accelerated Dolby Vision
- Sampler Feedback support
- Dual Queue Support

=== IPU ===
- Image Processing Unit, a special co-processor to improve image and video capture quality
- Not available on embedded models
- Initially there were i7-1165G7, i5-1135G7, i3-1125G4 and i3-1115G4 models with no IPU but later embedded processors were introduced instead

=== I/O ===
- PCI Express 4.0 (Pentium and Celeron CPUs are limited to PCI Express 3.0)
- Integrated Thunderbolt 4 (includes USB4)
- LPDDR4X-4267 memory support, except on desktop processors
- LPDDR5-5400 "architecture capability" (Intel expected Tiger Lake products with LPDDR5 RAM to be available around Q1 2021 but no companies ever released them)
- Miniaturization of CPU and motherboard into an M.2 SSD-sized small circuit board

=== Hardware telemetry ===
- Added Intel Platform Monitoring Technology

== List of Tiger Lake CPUs ==
=== Mobile processors (Tiger Lake-H) ===
- All models support DDR4-3200 memory
- All models support 20 reconfigurable PCI Express 4.0 lanes, allowing x16 Gen 4 link for discrete GPU and x4 Gen 4 link for M.2 SSDs

Processor branding	Model	Cores (threads)	Base freq at TDP (GHz)			Turbo freq, active cores (GHz)				UHD Graphics		Smart cache	TDP	Price
Processor branding	Model	Cores (threads)	@35 W	@45 W	@65 W	1 or 2	4	6	All	EUs	Max freq (GHz)	Smart cache	TDP	Price
Core i9	11980HK	8 (16)	—N/a	2.6	3.3	5.0	4.9	4.7	4.5	32	1.45	24 MB	45-65 W	$583
Xeon W	11955M vPro	8 (16)	2.1	2.6	—N/a	5.0	4.9	4.7	4.5	32	1.45	24 MB	35-45 W	$623
Core i9	11950H vPro	8 (16)	2.1	2.6	—N/a	5.0	4.9	4.7	4.5	32	1.45	24 MB	35-45 W	$556
Core i9	11900H	8 (16)	2.1	2.5	—N/a	4.9	4.8	4.6	4.4	32	1.45	24 MB	35-45 W	$546
Core i7	11850H vPro	8 (16)	2.1	2.5	—N/a	4.8	4.8	4.6	4.3	32	1.45	24 MB	35-45 W	$395
Core i7	11800H	8 (16)	1.9	2.3	—N/a	4.6	4.5	4.4	4.2	32	1.45	24 MB	35-45 W	$395
Xeon W	11855M vPro	6 (12)	2.6	3.2	—N/a	4.9	4.7	4.4		32	1.45	18 MB	35-45 W	$450
Core i7	11600H	6 (12)	2.5	2.9	—N/a	4.6				32	1.45	18 MB	35-45 W	$395
Core i5	11500H vPro	6 (12)	2.4	2.9	—N/a	4.6	4.4	4.2		32	1.45	12 MB	35-45 W	$250
Core i5	11400H	6 (12)	2.2	2.7	—N/a	4.5	4.3	4.1		16	1.45	12 MB	35-45 W	$250
Core i5	11260H	6 (12)	2.1	2.6	—N/a	4.4	4.2	4.0		16	1.40	12 MB	35-45 W	$250

=== Mobile processors (Tiger Lake-H35) ===
- All models support DDR4-3200 or LPDDR4X-4267 memory

Processor branding	Model	Cores (threads)	Base freq at TDP		Max Turbo freq active cores			Iris Xe Graphics		Smart cache	TDP	Price
Processor branding	Model	Cores (threads)	@28 W	@35 W	1	2	All	EUs	Max freq	Smart cache	TDP	Price
Core i7	11390H	4 (8)	2.9 GHz	3.4 GHz	5.0 GHz		4.6 GHz	96	1.40 GHz	12 MB	28-35 W	$426
Core i7	11375H	4 (8)	3.0 GHz	3.3 GHz	5.0 GHz	4.8 GHz	4.3 GHz	96	1.35 GHz	12 MB	28-35 W	$482
Core i7	11370H	4 (8)	3.0 GHz	3.3 GHz	4.8 GHz		4.3 GHz	96	1.35 GHz	12 MB	28-35 W	$426
Core i5	11320H	4 (8)	2.5 GHz	3.2 GHz	4.5 GHz		4.3 GHz	96	1.35 GHz	8 MB	28-35 W	$309
Core i5	11300H	4 (8)	2.6 GHz	3.1 GHz	4.4 GHz		4.0 GHz	80	1.30 GHz	8 MB	28-35 W	$309

=== Mobile processors (UP3-class) ===
Processor branding	Model	Cores (threads)	Base freq at TDP			Max Turbo freq		GPU			Smart cache	TDP	Memory support	Price
Processor branding	Model	Cores (threads)	@12 W	@15 W	@28 W	1 Core	All Cores	Model	EUs	Max freq	Smart cache	TDP	Memory support	Price
Core i7	1195G7	4 (8)	1.3 GHz		2.9 GHz	5.0 GHz	4.6 GHz	Iris Xe	96	1.40 GHz	12 MB	12-28 W	DDR4-3200 LPDDR4X-4267	$426
Core i7	1185G7 vPro	4 (8)	1.2 GHz	1.8 GHz	3.0 GHz	4.8 GHz	4.3 GHz	Iris Xe	96	1.35 GHz	12 MB	12-28 W	DDR4-3200 LPDDR4X-4267	$426
Core i7	1165G7	4 (8)	1.2 GHz	1.7 GHz	2.8 GHz	4.7 GHz	4.1 GHz	Iris Xe	96	1.30 GHz	12 MB	12-28 W	DDR4-3200 LPDDR4X-4267	$426
Core i5	1155G7	4 (8)	1.0 GHz		2.5 GHz	4.5 GHz	4.3 GHz	Iris Xe	80	1.35 GHz	8 MB	12-28 W	DDR4-3200 LPDDR4X-4267	$309
Core i5	1145G7 vPro	4 (8)	1.1 GHz	1.5 GHz	2.6 GHz	4.4 GHz	3.8 GHz	Iris Xe	80	1.30 GHz	8 MB	12-28 W	DDR4-3200 LPDDR4X-4267	$309
Core i5	1135G7	4 (8)	0.9 GHz	1.4 GHz	2.4 GHz	4.2 GHz	3.8 GHz	Iris Xe	80	1.30 GHz	8 MB	12-28 W	DDR4-3200 LPDDR4X-4267	$309
Core i3	1125G4	4 (8)	0.9 GHz		2.0 GHz	3.7 GHz	3.3 GHz	UHD	48	1.25 GHz	8 MB	12-28 W	DDR4-3200 LPDDR4X-3733	$281
Core i3	1115G4	2 (4)	1.7 GHz	2.2 GHz	3.0 GHz	4.1 GHz		UHD	48	1.25 GHz	6 MB	12-28 W	DDR4-3200 LPDDR4X-3733	$281
Pentium Gold	7505	2 (4)	—N/a	2.0 GHz	—N/a	3.5 GHz		UHD	48	1.25 GHz	4 MB	15 W	DDR4-3200 LPDDR4X-3733	$161
Celeron	6305	2 (2)	—N/a	1.8 GHz	—N/a	—N/a		UHD	48	1.25 GHz	4 MB	15 W	DDR4-3200 LPDDR4X-3733	$107

=== Embedded mobile processors (UP3-class) ===
Processor branding	Model	Cores (threads)	Base freq at TDP			Max Turbo freq	GPU			Smart cache	TDP	Memory support		Price
Processor branding	Model	Cores (threads)	@12 W	@15 W	@28 W	Max Turbo freq	Model	EUs	Max freq	Smart cache	TDP	Type	ECC	Price
Core i7	1185GRE vPro	4 (8)	1.2 GHz	1.8 GHz	2.8 GHz	4.4 GHz	Iris Xe	96	1.35 GHz	12 MB	15 W	DDR4-3200 LPDDR4X-4267	Yes	$490
Core i7	1185G7E vPro	4 (8)	1.2 GHz	1.8 GHz	2.8 GHz	4.4 GHz	Iris Xe	96	1.35 GHz	12 MB	15 W	DDR4-3200 LPDDR4X-4267	No	$431
Core i5	1145GRE vPro	4 (8)	1.1 GHz	1.5 GHz	2.6 GHz	4.1 GHz	Iris Xe	80	1.30 GHz	8 MB	15 W	DDR4-3200 LPDDR4X-4267	Yes	$362
Core i5	1145G7E vPro	4 (8)	1.1 GHz	1.5 GHz	2.6 GHz	4.1 GHz	Iris Xe	80	1.30 GHz	8 MB	15 W	DDR4-3200 LPDDR4X-4267	No	$312
Core i3	1115GRE	2 (4)	1.7 GHz	2.2 GHz	3.0 GHz	3.9 GHz	UHD	48	1.25 GHz	6 MB	15 W	DDR4-3200 LPDDR4X-3733	Yes	$338
Core i3	1115G4E	2 (4)	1.7 GHz	2.2 GHz	3.0 GHz	3.9 GHz	UHD	48	1.25 GHz	6 MB	15 W	DDR4-3200 LPDDR4X-3733	No	$285
Celeron	6305E	2 (2)	—N/a	1.8 GHz	—N/a	—N/a	UHD	48	1.25 GHz	4 MB	15 W	DDR4-3200 LPDDR4X-3733	No	$107

=== Mobile processors (UP4-class) ===
- TDP: 7-15W
- Memory support: LPDDR4X-4267

Processor branding	Model	Cores (threads)	Base freq at TDP			Max Turbo freq		GPU			Smart cache	Price
Processor branding	Model	Cores (threads)	@7 W	@9 W	@15 W	1 Core	All Cores	Model	EUs	Max freq	Smart cache	Price
Core i7	1180G7 vPro	4 (8)	0.9 GHz	1.3 GHz	2.2 GHz	4.6 GHz	3.7 GHz	Iris Xe	96	1.10 GHz	12 MB	$426
Core i7	1160G7	4 (8)	0.9 GHz	1.2 GHz	2.1 GHz	4.4 GHz	3.6 GHz	Iris Xe	96	1.10 GHz	12 MB	$426
Core i5	1140G7 vPro	4 (8)	0.8 GHz		1.8 GHz	4.2 GHz		Iris Xe	80	1.10 GHz	8 MB	$309
Core i5	1130G7	4 (8)	0.8 GHz	1.1 GHz	1.8 GHz	4.0 GHz	3.4 GHz	Iris Xe	80	1.10 GHz	8 MB	$309
Core i3	1120G4	4 (8)	0.8 GHz	1.1 GHz	1.5 GHz	3.5 GHz	3.0 GHz	UHD	48	1.10 GHz	8 MB	$281
Core i3	1110G4	2 (4)	1.5 GHz	1.8 GHz	2.5 GHz	3.9 GHz		UHD	48	1.10 GHz	6 MB	$281

=== Desktop processors (Tiger Lake-B) ===
- Socket: FCBGA1787, a BGA socket, thus these CPUs are meant only for system integrators
- Intel Xe UHD Graphics
- Up to 128 GB DDR4-3200 memory

Processor branding	Model	Cores (threads)	Base clock (GHz)	Boost clock (GHz)	L3 Cache	TDP	GPU EUs	GPU Max freq	Price
Core i9	11900KB	8 (16)	3.3	4.9	24 MB	55-65 W	32	1.45 GHz	$539
Core i7	11700B	8 (16)	3.2	4.8	24 MB	55-65 W	32	1.45 GHz	
Core i5	11500B	6 (12)	3.3	4.6	12 MB	65 W	32	1.45 GHz	
Core i3	11100B	4 (8)	3.6	4.4	12 MB	65 W	16	1.4 GHz	

== See also ==
- Process–architecture–optimization model
- List of Intel CPU microarchitectures

Atom (ULV)		Node name	Pentium/Core						
Microarch.	Step	Node name	Microarch.	Step					
		600 nm	P6	Pentium Pro (133 MHz)					
		500 nm	P6	Pentium Pro (150 MHz)					
		350 nm	P6	Pentium Pro (166–200 MHz)					
		350 nm	P6	Klamath					
		250 nm	P6	Deschutes					
		250 nm	P6	Katmai	NetBurst				
		180 nm	P6	Coppermine	Willamette				
		130 nm	P6	Tualatin	Northwood				
		130 nm	Pentium M	Banias	Northwood		NetBurst(HT)		NetBurst(×2)
		90 nm	Pentium M	Dothan	Prescott	⇨	Prescott‑2M	⇨	Smithfield
		90 nm	Pentium M	Dothan	~~Tejas~~	→	⇩	→	~~Cedarmill (Tejas)~~
		65 nm	Pentium M	Yonah	~~Nehalem (NetBurst)~~		Cedar Mill	⇨	Presler
		65 nm	Core	Merom	4 cores on mainstream desktop, DDR3 introduced				
Bonnell	Bonnell	45 nm	Core	Penryn					
Bonnell	Bonnell	45 nm	Nehalem	Nehalem	HT reintroduced, integrated MC, PCH; L3-cache introduced, 256 KB L2-cache/core				
Bonnell	Saltwell	32 nm	Nehalem	Westmere	Introduced GPU on same package and AES-NI				
Bonnell	Saltwell	32 nm	Sandy Bridge	Sandy Bridge	On-die ring bus, no more non-UEFI motherboards				
Silvermont	Silvermont	22 nm	Sandy Bridge	Ivy Bridge					
Silvermont	Silvermont	22 nm	Haswell	Haswell	Fully integrated voltage regulator				
Silvermont	Airmont	14 nm	Haswell	Broadwell					
Silvermont	Airmont	14 nm	Skylake	Skylake	DDR4 introduced on mainstream desktop				
Goldmont		14 nm	Skylake	Kaby Lake					
Goldmont		14 nm	Skylake	Coffee Lake	6 cores on mainstream desktop				
Goldmont		14 nm	Skylake	Amber Lake	Mobile-only				
Goldmont Plus		14 nm	Skylake	Whiskey Lake	Mobile-only				
Goldmont Plus		14 nm	Skylake	Coffee Lake Refresh	8 cores on mainstream desktop				
Goldmont Plus		14 nm	Skylake	Comet Lake	10 cores on mainstream desktop				
Goldmont Plus		14 nm	Sunny Cove	Cypress Cove (Rocket Lake)	Backported Sunny Cove microarchitecture for 14 nm				
Tremont		10 nm	Skylake	Palm Cove (Cannon Lake)	Mobile-only				
Tremont		10 nm	Sunny Cove	Sunny Cove (Ice Lake)	512 KB L2-cache/core				
Tremont		10 nm	Sunny Cove	Willow Cove (Tiger Lake)	X^{e} graphics engine				
Gracemont		Intel 7 (10 nm ESF)	Golden Cove	Golden Cove (Alder Lake)	Hybrid, DDR5, PCIe 5.0				
Gracemont		Intel 7 (10 nm ESF)	Golden Cove	Raptor Cove (Raptor Lake)					
Crestmont		Intel 4	Redwood Cove	Meteor Lake	Mobile-only; NPU, chiplet architecture				
Crestmont		Intel 3	Redwood Cove	Arrow Lake-U					
Skymont		TSMC N3B	Lion Cove	Lunar Lake	Low power mobile only (9–30 W)				
Skymont		TSMC N3B	Lion Cove	Arrow Lake					
Darkmont		Intel 18A	Cougar Cove	Panther Lake					
Arctic Wolf		Intel 18A and/or TSMC N2P	Coyote Cove	Nova Lake					
