= Cannon Lake (microprocessor) =

Intel processor family

General information
- Launched: May 15, 2018; 8 years ago
- Discontinued: February 28, 2020; 6 years ago
- Marketed by: Intel
- Common manufacturer: Intel

Performance
- Max. CPU clock rate: 3.2 GHz

Physical specifications
- Cores: 2
- GPU: Factory disabled
- Socket: BGA 1440

Architecture and classification
- Technology node: Intel 10 nm (tri-gate) transistors
- Microarchitecture: Palm Cove

Products, models, variants
- Product code name: CNL
- Brand name: Core

History
- Predecessors: Mobile: Coffee Lake (2nd optimization); Kaby Lake Refresh (2nd optimization)
- Successor: Ice Lake (architecture)

Support status
- Legacy support for iGPU

Cannon Lake is Intel's codename for the ninth generation of Core-branded microprocessors based on Palm Cove, a 10 nm die shrink of the Kaby Lake microarchitecture. As a die shrink, Palm Cove is a new process in Intel's process-architecture-optimization execution plan as the next step in semiconductor fabrication. Cannon Lake CPUs are the first mainstream CPUs to support the AVX-512 instruction set.

Prior to Cannon Lake's launch, Intel launched another 14 nm process refinement with the codename Coffee Lake.

Having released only one single product during its lifecycle, Cannon Lake is one of the shortest-lived x86 microarchitectures of all time. The sole production model, Core i3-8121U, is a low power entry-level processor designed for laptops, and sold in very limited quantities. It is succeeded by Ice Lake, the Sunny Cove-based microarchitecture manufactured with the same 10 nm process. represents the architecture phase in the process-architecture-optimization model.

== Design history and features ==
Palm Cove
General information
- Designed by: Intel

Cache
- L1 cache: 64 KB per core
- L2 cache: 256 KB per core
- L3 cache: 2 MB per core

Architecture and classification
- Instruction set: x86-64
- Instructions: x86-64, Intel 64
- Extensions: MMX, AES-NI, CLMUL, RDRAND, FMA3, SSE, SSE2, SSE3, SSSE3, SSE4.1, SSE4.2, AVX, AVX2, AVX-512, SHA, TXT, TSX, SGX, VT-x, VT-d

History
- Predecessor: Skylake
- Successor: Sunny Cove

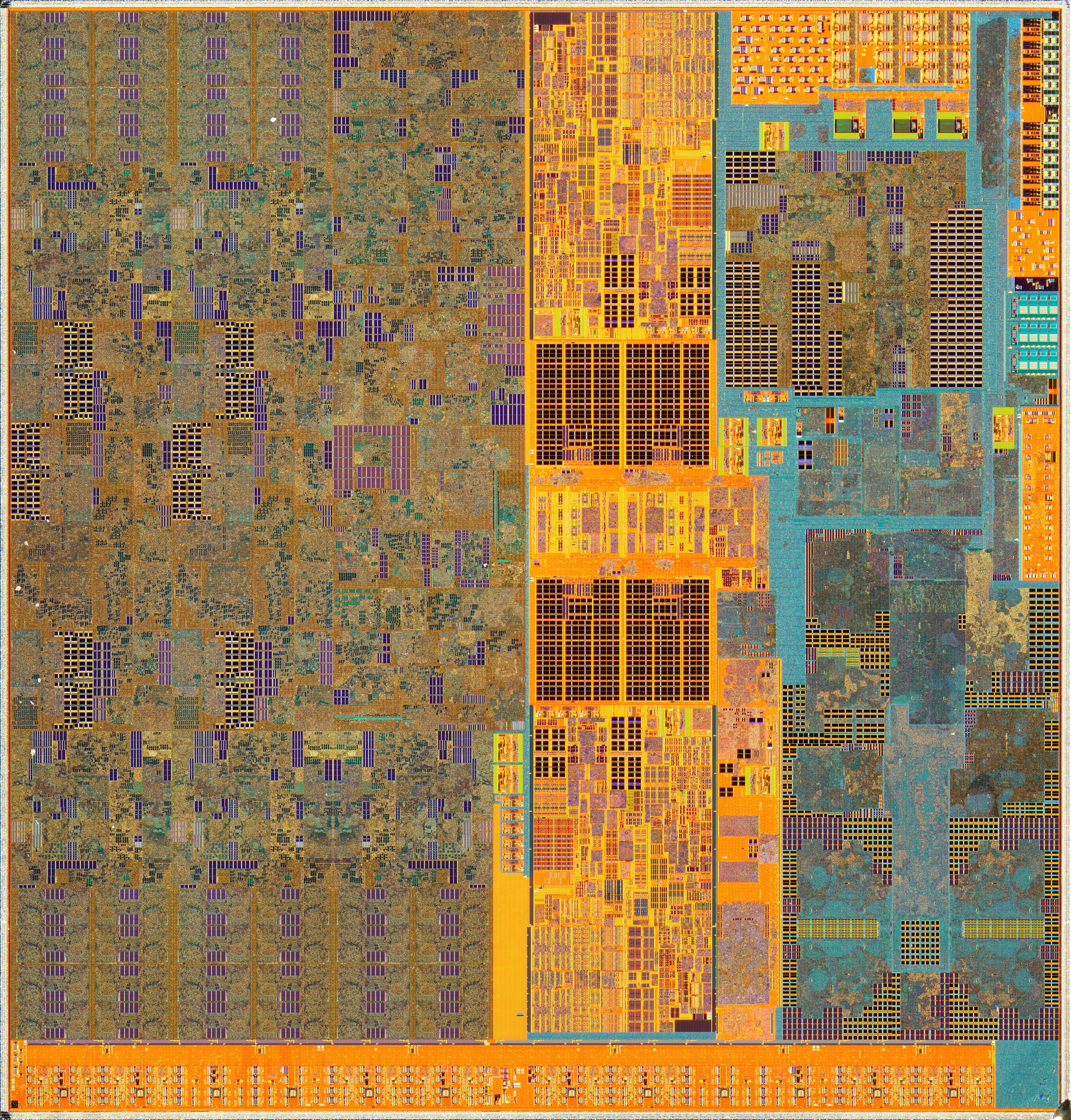
Cannon Lake processor die from an i3-8121U with Palm Cove cores

Cannon Lake was initially expected to be released in 2015/2016, but the release was pushed back to 2018. Intel demonstrated a laptop with an unknown Cannon Lake CPU at CES 2017 and announced that Cannon Lake based products would be available in 2018 at the earliest.

At CES 2018 Intel announced that it had started shipping mobile Cannon Lake CPUs at the end of 2017 and would ramp up production in 2018.

On April 26, 2018 in its report on first-quarter 2018 financial results, Intel stated it was currently shipping low-volume 10 nm product and expects 10 nm volume production to shift to 2019. In July 2018, Intel announced that volume production of Cannon Lake would be delayed yet again, to late Q2 2019.

The microarchitecture's only product, the Core i3-8121U, is a dual core CPU with Hyper-Threading and Turbo Boost. Despite having an integrated GPU physically present on die, it was disabled during the factory binning process, and therefore non-functional. The model was released in May 2018 in very limited quantities. Apart from laptops, the CPU was also used in Intel's 2018 NUC codenamed Crimson Canyon.

On October 28, 2019, Intel announced that it will be discontinuing the i3-8121U and the Crimson Canyon NUC, with orders being taken till December 27, and shipping till February 28, 2020. This made Cannon Lake one of the shortest-lived x86 CPU microarchitecture, having launched only one CPU model and manufactured for merely 1.5 years.

In July 2021, Intel announced it would be removing support for Cannon Lake graphics in their Linux kernel driver, effective as of Linux 5.15, since no production Cannon Lake CPUs were ever shipped with integrated graphics enabled. Approximately 1,600 lines of source code were removed from the driver as a result.

=== Improvements ===
- Skylake-based CPU cores with AVX-512 instruction set support
- First Intel product manufactured with the company's 10 nm process technology

== Products ==
=== Mobile processors ===
==== Cannon Lake-U ====
Common features:

- Socket: BGA 1440.
- Memory support: DDR4-2400 or LPDDR4-2400 dual channel (maximum supported: 32 GB).
- PCIe support: 16 lanes of Gen3.

Processor branding	Model	Cores (threads)	CPU clock rate		GPU	Smart cache	TDP	cTDP	Price (USD)
Processor branding	Model	Cores (threads)	Base	Turbo	GPU	Smart cache	TDP	Down	Price (USD)
Core i3	8121U	2 (4)	2.2 GHz	3.2 GHz	—N/a	4 MB	15 W	—N/a	?

== See also ==
- List of Intel CPU microarchitectures

Atom (ULV)		Node name	Pentium/Core						
Microarch.	Step	Node name	Microarch.	Step					
		600 nm	P6	Pentium Pro (133 MHz)					
		500 nm	P6	Pentium Pro (150 MHz)					
		350 nm	P6	Pentium Pro (166–200 MHz)					
		350 nm	P6	Klamath					
		250 nm	P6	Deschutes					
		250 nm	P6	Katmai	NetBurst				
		180 nm	P6	Coppermine	Willamette				
		130 nm	P6	Tualatin	Northwood				
		130 nm	Pentium M	Banias	Northwood		NetBurst(HT)		NetBurst(×2)
		90 nm	Pentium M	Dothan	Prescott	⇨	Prescott‑2M	⇨	Smithfield
		90 nm	Pentium M	Dothan	~~Tejas~~	→	⇩	→	~~Cedarmill (Tejas)~~
		65 nm	Pentium M	Yonah	~~Nehalem (NetBurst)~~		Cedar Mill	⇨	Presler
		65 nm	Core	Merom	4 cores on mainstream desktop, DDR3 introduced				
Bonnell	Bonnell	45 nm	Core	Penryn					
Bonnell	Bonnell	45 nm	Nehalem	Nehalem	HT reintroduced, integrated MC, PCH; L3-cache introduced, 256 KB L2-cache/core				
Bonnell	Saltwell	32 nm	Nehalem	Westmere	Introduced GPU on same package and AES-NI				
Bonnell	Saltwell	32 nm	Sandy Bridge	Sandy Bridge	On-die ring bus, no more non-UEFI motherboards				
Silvermont	Silvermont	22 nm	Sandy Bridge	Ivy Bridge					
Silvermont	Silvermont	22 nm	Haswell	Haswell	Fully integrated voltage regulator				
Silvermont	Airmont	14 nm	Haswell	Broadwell					
Silvermont	Airmont	14 nm	Skylake	Skylake	DDR4 introduced on mainstream desktop				
Goldmont		14 nm	Skylake	Kaby Lake					
Goldmont		14 nm	Skylake	Coffee Lake	6 cores on mainstream desktop				
Goldmont		14 nm	Skylake	Amber Lake	Mobile-only				
Goldmont Plus		14 nm	Skylake	Whiskey Lake	Mobile-only				
Goldmont Plus		14 nm	Skylake	Coffee Lake Refresh	8 cores on mainstream desktop				
Goldmont Plus		14 nm	Skylake	Comet Lake	10 cores on mainstream desktop				
Goldmont Plus		14 nm	Sunny Cove	Cypress Cove (Rocket Lake)	Backported Sunny Cove microarchitecture for 14 nm				
Tremont		10 nm	Skylake	Palm Cove (Cannon Lake)	Mobile-only				
Tremont		10 nm	Sunny Cove	Sunny Cove (Ice Lake)	512 KB L2-cache/core				
Tremont		10 nm	Sunny Cove	Willow Cove (Tiger Lake)	X^{e} graphics engine				
Gracemont		Intel 7 (10 nm ESF)	Golden Cove	Golden Cove (Alder Lake)	Hybrid, DDR5, PCIe 5.0				
Gracemont		Intel 7 (10 nm ESF)	Golden Cove	Raptor Cove (Raptor Lake)					
Crestmont		Intel 4	Redwood Cove	Meteor Lake	Mobile-only; NPU, chiplet architecture				
Crestmont		Intel 3	Redwood Cove	Arrow Lake-U					
Skymont		TSMC N3B	Lion Cove	Lunar Lake	Low power mobile only (9–30 W)				
Skymont		TSMC N3B	Lion Cove	Arrow Lake					
Darkmont		Intel 18A	Cougar Cove	Panther Lake					
Arctic Wolf		Intel 18A and/or TSMC N2P	Coyote Cove	Nova Lake					
