= Sunny Cove (microarchitecture) =

Intel CPU microarchitecture launched in 2019

General information
- Launched: September 2019; 7 years ago
- Designed by: Intel
- Common manufacturer: Intel

Cache
- L1 cache: 80 KB per core: 32 KB instructions; 48 KB data
- L2 cache: 512 KB per core
- L3 cache: 2 MB per core

Architecture and classification
- Technology node: Intel 10 nm FinFET process
- Instruction set: x86, x86-64
- Extensions: AES-NI, CLMUL, RDRAND, SHA, TXT, SGX, MMX, SSE, SSE2, SSE3, SSSE3, SSE4.1, SSE4.2, AVX, AVX2, AVX-512, FMA3, VT-x, VT-d

Products, models, variants
- Product code names: Ice Lake (mobile); Ice Lake-SP (server)

History
- Predecessors: Palm Cove (mobile); Skylake (server)
- Successors: Willow Cove (mobile); Golden Cove (server)

Sunny Cove is a codename for a CPU microarchitecture developed by Intel, first released in September 2019. It succeeds the Palm Cove microarchitecture and is fabricated using Intel's 10 nm process node. The microarchitecture is implemented in 10th-generation Intel Core processors for mobile (codenamed Ice Lake) and third generation Xeon scalable server processors (codenamed Ice Lake-SP). 10th-generation Intel Core mobile processors were released in September 2019, while the Xeon server processors were released on April 6, 2021.

There are no desktop products featuring Sunny Cove. However, a variant named Cypress Cove is used for the 11th-generation Intel Core desktop processors (codenamed Rocket Lake). Cypress Cove is a version of the Sunny Cove microarchitecture backported to Intel's 14 nm process node.

The direct successor to the Sunny Cove microarchitecture is the Willow Cove microarchitecture, which powers the 11th-generation Intel Core mobile processors.

== Features ==
Sunny Cove was designed by Intel Israel's processor design team in Haifa, Israel.

Intel released details of Ice Lake and its microarchitecture, Sunny Cove, during Intel Architecture Day in December 2018, stating that the Sunny Cove cores would be focusing on single-thread performance, new instructions, and scalability improvements. Intel stated that the performance improvements would be achieved by making the core "deeper, wider, and smarter".

Sunny Cove features a 50% increase in the size of L1 data cache, a larger L2 cache dependent on product size, larger μOP cache, and larger second-level TLB. The core has also increased in width, by increasing execution ports from eight to ten and by doubling the L1 store bandwidth. Allocation width has also increased from four to five. The 5-level paging scheme supports a linear address space up to 57 bits and a physical address space up to 52 bits, increasing the virtual memory space to 128 petabytes, up from 256 terabytes, and the addressable physical memory to 4 petabytes, up from 64 terabytes.

=== Improvements ===
- On average 18% increase in IPC in comparison to 2015 Skylake running at the same frequency and memory configuration
- Increase L1 data cache: 48 kiB (from 32 kiB)
- L2 cache: 512 kiB
- Larger micro-instruction cache (2304 entries, up from 1536)
- Dynamic Tuning 2.0 which allows the CPU to stay at turbo frequencies for longer
- Hardware acceleration for SHA operations (Secure Hash Algorithms)
- New AVX-512 instruction subsets:
  - VPOPCNTDQ
  - VBMI2
  - BITALG
  - VPCLMULQDQ
  - GFNI
  - VAES
  - VNNI
- Wider decoder (from skylake's 3 simple + 1 complex 4 way decoding to Sunny cove's 4 simple + 1 complex 5 wide decoder)
- 1.6x larger ROB (352, up from 224 entries)
  - Scheduler
    - 1.65x larger scheduler (160-entry, up from 97 entries)
    - Larger dispatch (10-way, up from 8-way)
  - 1.55x larger integer register file (280-entry, up from 180)
  - 1.33x larger vector register file (224-entry, up from 168)
  - Distributed scheduling queues (4 scheduling queues, up from 2)
- Intel Deep Learning Boost, used for machine learning/artificial intelligence inference acceleration

== Cypress Cove ==
Cypress Cove
- Cypress Cove die from an i5-11400

General information
- Launched: March 30, 2021; 5 years ago
- Designed by: Intel
- Common manufacturer: Intel

Cache
- L1 cache: 80 KB per core: 32 KB instructions; 48 KB data
- L2 cache: 512 KB per core
- L3 cache: 2 MB per core

Architecture and classification
- Technology node: Intel 14 nm FinFET process
- Instruction set: x86, x86-64
- Extensions: MMX, SSE, SSE2, SSE3, SSSE3, SSE4.1, SSE4.2; AVX, AVX2, AVX-512, FMA3; AES, CLMUL, RDRAND, SHA, TXT; VT-d, VT-x

Products, models, variants
- Product code name: Rocket Lake

History
- Predecessor: Skylake
- Successor: Golden Cove

Cypress Cove is a CPU microarchitecture based on the Sunny Cove microarchitecture designed for 10 nm, backported to 14 nm. It succeeds the Skylake microarchitecture, and is manufactured using Intel's 14 nm process node. Cypress Cove is identical to Sunny Cove, aside from a number of improvements and other changes. Intel claims an increase of 19% in IPC in Cypress Cove–based Rocket Lake processors compared to Comet Lake.

Cypress Cove is implemented on 11th Gen Intel Core desktop processors (codenamed Rocket Lake). Rocket Lake and its underlying microarchitecture were first described in November 2020, and was later released on March 30, 2021.

SGX is removed from Rocket Lake.

== Products ==
Sunny Cove powers the 10th generation of Intel Core mobile processors (codenamed Ice Lake) and the third generation of Xeon Scalable server processors (codenamed Ice Lake-SP). Cypress Cove is implemented on 11th-generation Intel Core desktop processors (codenamed Rocket Lake).

Atom (ULV)		Node name	Pentium/Core						
Microarch.	Step	Node name	Microarch.	Step					
		600 nm	P6	Pentium Pro (133 MHz)					
		500 nm	P6	Pentium Pro (150 MHz)					
		350 nm	P6	Pentium Pro (166–200 MHz)					
		350 nm	P6	Klamath					
		250 nm	P6	Deschutes					
		250 nm	P6	Katmai	NetBurst				
		180 nm	P6	Coppermine	Willamette				
		130 nm	P6	Tualatin	Northwood				
		130 nm	Pentium M (P6)	Banias	Northwood		NetBurst(HT)		NetBurst(×2)
		90 nm	Pentium M (P6)	Dothan	Prescott	⇨	Prescott‑2M	⇨	Smithfield
		90 nm	Pentium M (P6)	Dothan	~~Tejas~~	→	⇩	→	~~Cedarmill (Tejas)~~
		65 nm	Pentium M (P6)	Yonah	~~Nehalem (NetBurst)~~		Cedar Mill	⇨	Presler
		65 nm	Core	Merom	4 cores on mainstream desktop, DDR3 introduced				
Bonnell	Bonnell	45 nm	Core	Penryn					
Bonnell	Bonnell	45 nm	Nehalem	Nehalem	HT reintroduced, integrated MC, PCH; L3-cache introduced, 256 KB L2-cache/core				
Bonnell	Saltwell	32 nm	Nehalem	Westmere	Introduced GPU on same package and AES-NI				
Bonnell	Saltwell	32 nm	Sandy Bridge	Sandy Bridge	On-die ring bus, no more non-UEFI motherboards				
Silvermont	Silvermont	22 nm	Sandy Bridge	Ivy Bridge					
Silvermont	Silvermont	22 nm	Haswell	Haswell	Fully integrated voltage regulator				
Silvermont	Airmont	14 nm	Haswell	Broadwell					
Silvermont	Airmont	14 nm	Skylake	Skylake	DDR4 introduced on mainstream desktop				
Goldmont		14 nm	Skylake	Kaby Lake					
Goldmont		14 nm	Skylake	Coffee Lake	6 cores on mainstream desktop				
Goldmont		14 nm	Skylake	Amber Lake	Mobile-only				
Goldmont Plus		14 nm	Skylake	Whiskey Lake	Mobile-only				
Goldmont Plus		14 nm	Skylake	Coffee Lake Refresh	8 cores on mainstream desktop				
Goldmont Plus		14 nm	Skylake	Comet Lake	10 cores on mainstream desktop				
Goldmont Plus		14 nm	Sunny Cove	Cypress Cove (Rocket Lake)	Backported Sunny Cove microarchitecture for 14 nm				
Tremont		10 nm	Skylake	Palm Cove (Cannon Lake)	Mobile-only				
Tremont		10 nm	Sunny Cove	Sunny Cove (Ice Lake)	512 KB L2-cache/core				
Tremont		10 nm	Sunny Cove	Willow Cove (Tiger Lake)	X^{e} graphics engine				
Gracemont		Intel 7 (10 nm ESF)	Golden Cove	Golden Cove (Alder Lake)	Hybrid, DDR5, PCIe 5.0				
Gracemont		Intel 7 (10 nm ESF)	Golden Cove	Raptor Cove (Raptor Lake)					
Crestmont		Intel 4	Redwood Cove	Meteor Lake	Mobile-only; NPU, chiplet architecture				
Crestmont		Intel 3	Redwood Cove	Arrow Lake-U					
Skymont		TSMC N3B	Lion Cove	Lunar Lake	Low power mobile only (9–30 W)				
Skymont		TSMC N3B	Lion Cove	Arrow Lake					
Darkmont		Intel 18A	Cougar Cove	Panther Lake					
Arctic Wolf		Intel 18A and/or TSMC N2P	Coyote Cove	Nova Lake					
