= Sunny Cove =

Sunny Cove may refer to:

- Sunny Cove (microarchitecture)
- Sunny Cove State Marine Park, Alaska, United States
