= LGA 4189 =

Intel CPU socket

- Release date: April 18, 2020
- Designed by: Intel
- Manufactured by: Lotes
- Type: LGA-ZIF
- Chip form factors: Flip-chip
- Contacts: 4189
- FSB protocol: PCI Express
- Processors: Cooper Lake; Ice Lake-SP
- Predecessor: LGA 3647
- Successor: LGA 4677
- Memory support: DDR4
- This article is part of the CPU socket series

LGA 4189 is an Intel microprocessor compatible socket, used by Cooper Lake and Ice Lake-SP microprocessors.

Two incompatible versions exist: Socket P5 for Cedar Island platform and Cooper Lake, and Socket P4 for Whitley platform and Ice Lake-SP.
