= Indirect branch tracking =

Control flow integrity technology

Indirect branch tracking (IBT), also known as branch target identification (BTI), is a control flow integrity mechanism implemented on some Intel x86-64 and ARM-64 processors. IBT is designed to protect against computer security exploits that use indirect branch instructions to jump into code in unintended ways, such as return-oriented programming.

It creates special "branch target" instructions that have no function other than to mark a location as a valid indirect branch target, with the processor capable of being put into a mode where it will raise an exception if an indirect branch is made to a location without a branch target instruction.

== Implementations ==
On Intel processors, the technique is known as Indirect Branch Tracking (IBT), with the "end branch" instructions endbr32 and endbr64 acting as the branch target instructions for 32- and 64-bit mode respectively. IBT is part of the Intel Control-Flow Enforcement Technology first released in the Tiger Lake generation of processors.

The similar technology on ARM-64 processors is called Branch Target Identification (BTI), with the instruction, also called BTI, having three variants that make it check only for jumps, or function calls, or for both.

RISC-V has a corresponding ratified extension named Zicfilp, that implements a special landing pad instruction.
