= SHA instruction set =

Extensions to the x86 instruction set architecture

A SHA instruction set is a set of extensions to the ARM, Power, RISC-V and x86 instruction set architecture which support hardware acceleration of the Secure Hash Algorithm (SHA) family.

== ARM ==
SHA-1 and SHA-256 instructions appeared as optional features (FEAT_SHA1 and FEAT_SHA256) in the Arm V8.0 architecture introduced in 2011. The instructions are:

- SHA-1: SHA1C, SHA1H, SHA1M, SHA1P, SHA1SU0, SHA1SU1
- SHA-256: SHA256H, SHA256H2, SHA256SU0, SHA256SU1

SHA-512 and SHA-3 instructions appeared as optional features (FEAT_SHA512 and FEAT_SHA3) in the Arm V8.2 architecture. The instructions are:

- SHA-512: SHA512H, SHA512H2, SHA512SU0, SHA512SU1
- SHA-3: EOR3, RAX1, XAR, BCAX

A scalable vector extension (SVE) version of the SHA-3 instructions appeared as an optional feature (FEAT_SVE_SHA3) in the Arm V9.0 architecture.

== Power ==
Vector instructions for the Sigma functions for SHA-256 (vshasigmaw) and SHA-512 (vshasigmad) were added in the specification for Power ISA v.2.07 released in May 2013. The same instruction performs either Σ₀, Σ₁, σ₀ or σ₁ as described in the SHA-2 standard (FIPS-180-4) depending on parameters.

== RISC-V ==
SHA2 instructions are part of the Zknh extension part of the RISC-V Cryptography Extensions Volume I: Scalar & Entropy Source Instructions ratified in November 2021.

As SHA-512 is defined on 64-bit words, the instructions for SHA-512 differ in RV32 and RV64, with some RV32 instructions for SHA-512 split the elementary sigma operations in half in order to operate on a single 32-bit register.

The instructions are:

- SHA-256 (RV32 and RV64): sha256sig0 (SHA-256 σ₀), sha256sig1 (SHA-256 σ₁), sha256sum0 (SHA-256 Σ₀), sha256sum1 (SHA-256 Σ₁)
- SHA-512 (RV32): sha512sig0h (high half of SHA-512 σ₀), sha512sig0l (low half of SHA-512 σ₀), sha512sig1h (high half of SHA-512 σ₁), sha512sig1l (low half of SHA-512 σ₁), sha512sum0r (SHA-512 Σ₀), sha512sum1r (SHA-512 Σ₁)
- SHA-512 (RV64): sha512sig0 (SHA-512 σ₀), sha512sig1 (SHA-512 σ₁), sha512sum0 (SHA-512 Σ₀), sha512sum1 (SHA-512 Σ₁)

== x86 architecture processors ==
The original SSE-based extensions added four instructions supporting SHA-1 and three for SHA-256 and were specified in 2013 by Intel. Instructions for SHA-512 were introduced in Arrow Lake and Lunar Lake in 2024.

- SHA-1: SHA1RNDS4, SHA1NEXTE, SHA1MSG1, SHA1MSG2
- SHA-256: SHA256RNDS2, SHA256MSG1, SHA256MSG2

The newer SHA-512 instruction set comprises AVX-based versions of the original SHA instruction set marked with a V prefix and these three new AVX-based instructions for SHA-512:

- VSHA512RNDS2, VSHA512MSG1, VSHA512MSG2

=== AMD ===
All recent AMD processors support the original SHA instruction set:

- AMD Zen (2017) and later processors.

=== Intel ===
The following Intel processors support the original SHA instruction set:

- Intel Goldmont (2016) and later Atom microarchitecture processors.
- Intel Cannon Lake (2018/2019), Ice Lake (2019) and later processors for laptops ("mainstream mobile").
- Intel Rocket Lake (2021) and later processors for desktop computers.

The following Intel processors support the newer SHA-512 instruction set:

- Intel Arrow Lake and Lunar Lake processors.
