= List of Intel graphics processing units =

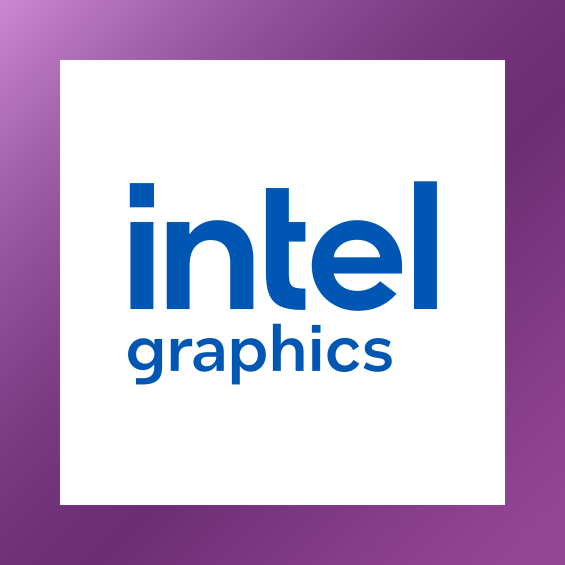
The Intel Graphics badge

This article contains information about Intel's GPUs (see Intel Graphics Technology) and motherboard graphics chipsets in table form. In 1982, Intel licensed the NEC μPD7220 and announced it as the Intel 82720 Graphics Display Controller.

== Gen1 ==
Intel's first generation GPUs:

Graphics	Launch	Market	Chipset	Code name	Device ID	RAMDAC clock (MHz)	Pixel pipelines	Shader model (vertex/pixel)	API support			Memory bandwidth (GB/s)	DVMT (MB)	Hardware acceleration		
Graphics	Launch	Market	Chipset	Code name	Device ID	RAMDAC clock (MHz)	Pixel pipelines	Shader model (vertex/pixel)	Direct3D	OpenGL	OpenCL	Memory bandwidth (GB/s)	DVMT (MB)	MPEG-2	VC-1	AVC
i740	1998	Desktop	stand-alone	Auburn	7800	220	1	3.0 (SW) / No	5.0	1.1	No	0.8	2–8	Optional external MPEG-2 decoder via Video Module Interface	No	No
i752	1999	Desktop	stand-alone	Portola	1240	250	1	3.0 (SW) / No	6.0 (full); 8.0 (some features, no hardware shaders)	1.1	No	0.8(PC100)–1.067(PC133); 1.067(AGP 4× for AIMM)	8–16	MC	No	No
3D graphics with Direct AGP	1999	Desktop	810	Whitney	7121	230	1	3.0 (SW) / No	6.0 (full); 8.0 (some features, no hardware shaders)	1.1	No	0.8(PC100)–1.067(PC133); 1.067(AGP 4× for AIMM)	32	MC	No	No
3D graphics with Direct AGP	1999	Desktop	810-DC100	Whitney	7123	230	1	3.0 (SW) / No	6.0 (full); 8.0 (some features, no hardware shaders)	1.1	No	0.8(PC100)–1.067(PC133); 1.067(AGP 4× for AIMM)	32	MC	No	No
3D graphics with Direct AGP	1999	Desktop	810E; 810E2	Whitney	7125	230	1	3.0 (SW) / No	6.0 (full); 8.0 (some features, no hardware shaders)	1.1	No	0.8(PC100)–1.067(PC133); 1.067(AGP 4× for AIMM)	32	MC	No	No
3D graphics with Direct AGP	2000	Desktop	815; 815E; 8925G; 815EG	Solano	1132	230	1	3.0 (SW) / No	6.0 (full); 9.0 (some features, no hardware shaders)	1.1	No	0.8(PC100)–1.067(PC133); 1.067(AGP 4× for AIMM)	32	MC	No	No

== Gen2 ==
Intel marketed its second generation using the brand Extreme Graphics. These chips added support for texture combiners allowing support for OpenGL 1.3.

Graphics	Launch	Market	Chipset	Code name	Device ID	Core render clock (MHz)	Pixel pipelines	Shader model (vertex/pixel)	API support			Memory bandwidth (GB/s)	DVMT (MB)	Hardware acceleration		
Graphics	Launch	Market	Chipset	Code name	Device ID	Core render clock (MHz)	Pixel pipelines	Shader model (vertex/pixel)	Direct3D	OpenGL	OpenCL	Memory bandwidth (GB/s)	DVMT (MB)	MPEG-2	VC-1	AVC
Extreme Graphics	2002	Desktop	845G; 845GE; 845GL; 845GV	Brookdale	2562	200	2	3.0 (SW) / No	6.0 (full); 9.0 (some features, no hardware shaders)	1.3; ES 1.1^{Linux}	No	2.1	64	MC	No	No
Extreme Graphics	2001	Mobile	830M; 830MG	Almador	3577	166	2	3.0 (SW) / No	6.0 (full); 9.0 (some features, no hardware shaders)	1.3; ES 1.1^{Linux}	No	1	64	MC	No	No
Extreme Graphics 2	2003	Desktop	865G; 865GV	Springdale	2572	266	2	3.0 (SW) / No	6.0 (full); 9.0 (some features, no hardware shaders)	1.3; ES 1.1^{Linux}	No	6.4	64	MC	No	No
Extreme Graphics 2	2003	Mobile	852GM; 852GME; 852GMV	Montara	3582	133–266	2	3.0 (SW) / No	6.0 (full); 9.0 (some features, no hardware shaders)	1.3; ES 1.1^{Linux}	No	2.1–2.7	64	MC	No	No
Extreme Graphics 2	2003	Mobile	854	Montara	358E	133–266	2	3.0 (SW) / No	6.0 (full); 9.0 (some features, no hardware shaders)	1.3; ES 1.1^{Linux}	No	2.1–2.7	64	MC	No	No
Extreme Graphics 2	2003	Mobile	855GM; 855GME	Montara	3582	133–266	2	3.0 (SW) / No	6.0 (full); 9.0 (some features, no hardware shaders)	1.3; ES 1.1^{Linux}	No	2.1–2.7	64	MC	No	No

== Gen3 ==
Intel's first DirectX 9 GPUs with hardware Pixel Shader 2.0 support.

Graphics	Launch	Market	Chipset		Device ID	Pixel pipelines	Clock rate (MHz)	Memory		API support				Hardware acceleration		
Graphics	Launch	Market	Code name	Name	Device ID	Pixel pipelines	Clock rate (MHz)	DVMT (MB)	Bandwidth (GB/s)	Shader model (vertex/pixel)	Direct3D	OpenGL	OpenCL	MPEG-2	VC-1	AVC
GMA 900	2004	Desktop	Grantsdale	910GL	2582; 258A	4	333	128	3.2	3.0 (SW) / 2.0	6.0 (full); 9.0 (partial; no WDDM nor Aero support)	1.4; 2.1^{Linux} ES 2.0^{Linux}	No	MC	No	No
GMA 900	2004	Desktop	Grantsdale	915GL	2582; 258A	4	333	128	3.2	3.0 (SW) / 2.0	6.0 (full); 9.0 (partial; no WDDM nor Aero support)	1.4; 2.1^{Linux} ES 2.0^{Linux}	No	MC	No	No
GMA 900	2004	Desktop	Grantsdale	915GV	2582; 258A	4	333	128	8.5	3.0 (SW) / 2.0	6.0 (full); 9.0 (partial; no WDDM nor Aero support)	1.4; 2.1^{Linux} ES 2.0^{Linux}	No	MC	No	No
GMA 900	2004	Desktop	Grantsdale	915G	2582; 258A	4	333	128	8.5	3.0 (SW) / 2.0	6.0 (full); 9.0 (partial; no WDDM nor Aero support)	1.4; 2.1^{Linux} ES 2.0^{Linux}	No	MC	No	No
GMA 900	2005	Mobile	Alviso	Mobile 915; Family	2592	4	133–333	128	8.5	3.0 (SW) / 2.0	6.0 (full); 9.0 (partial; no WDDM nor Aero support)	1.4; 2.1^{Linux} ES 2.0^{Linux}	No	MC	No	No
GMA 950	2005	Desktop	Lakeport	945GZ	2772	4	400	256	8.5	3.0 (SW) / 2.0	9.0c FL9_1	1.4; 2.1^{Linux} ES 2.0^{Linux}	No	MC	No	No
GMA 950	2005	Desktop	Lakeport	945GC	2772	4	400	256	10.7	3.0 (SW) / 2.0	9.0c FL9_1	1.4; 2.1^{Linux} ES 2.0^{Linux}	No	MC	No	No
GMA 950	2005	Desktop	Lakeport	945G	2772	4	400	256	10.7	3.0 (SW) / 2.0	9.0c FL9_1	1.4; 2.1^{Linux} ES 2.0^{Linux}	No	MC	No	No
GMA 950	2006	Mobile	Calistoga	Mobile 945; Family	27A2; 27AE	4	166–400	256	10.7	3.0 (SW) / 2.0	9.0c FL9_1	1.4; 2.1^{Linux} ES 2.0^{Linux}	No	MC	No	No
GMA 3100	2007	Desktop	Bearlake	Q33	29D2	4	400	256	12.8	3.0 (SW) / 2.0	9.0c FL9_1	1.4; 2.1^{Linux} ES 2.0^{Linux}	No	MC	No	No
GMA 3100	2007	Desktop	Bearlake	Q35	29B2	4	400	256	12.8	3.0 (SW) / 2.0	9.0c FL9_1	1.4; 2.1^{Linux} ES 2.0^{Linux}	No	MC	No	No
GMA 3100	2007	Desktop	Bearlake	G31	29C2	4	400	256	12.8	3.0 (SW) / 2.0	9.0c FL9_1	1.4; 2.1^{Linux} ES 2.0^{Linux}	No	MC	No	No
GMA 3100	2007	Desktop	Bearlake	G33	29C2	4	400	256	12.8 (DDR2); 17 (DDR3)	3.0 (SW) / 2.0	9.0c FL9_1	1.4; 2.1^{Linux} ES 2.0^{Linux}	No	Variable-Length Decoding (VLD) + iDCT + MC (Full)	No	No
GMA 3150	2010	Nettop	Pineview	Atom D4xx; Atom D5xx	A001	2	400	384	6.4	3.0 (SW) / 2.0	9.0c FL9_1	1.4; 2.1^{Linux} ES 2.0^{Linux}	No	Variable-Length Decoding (VLD) + iDCT + MC (Full)	No	No
GMA 3150	2010	Netbook	Pineview	Atom N4xx; Atom N5xx	A011	2	200	384	5.3	3.0 (SW) / 2.0	9.0c FL9_1	1.4; 2.1^{Linux} ES 2.0^{Linux}	No	Variable-Length Decoding (VLD) + iDCT + MC (Full)	No	No

== Gen4 ==
The last generation of motherboard integrated graphics. Full hardware DirectX 10 support starting with GMA X3500.

- Each EU has a 128-bit wide FPU that natively executes four 32-bit operations per clock cycle.

Graphics	Launch	Market	Code name	Chipset	Device ID	Core render clock (MHz)	Execution units	Shader model (vertex/pixel)	API support			Memory bandwidth (GB/s)	DVMT (MB)	Hardware acceleration		
Graphics	Launch	Market	Code name	Chipset	Device ID	Core render clock (MHz)	Execution units	Shader model (vertex/pixel)	Direct3D	OpenGL	OpenCL	Memory bandwidth (GB/s)	DVMT (MB)	MPEG-2	VC-1	AVC
GMA 3000	2006	Desktop	Lakeport	946GZ	2972	667	8	3.0 (SW) / 2.0	9.0c FL9_1	1.4; 2.1^{Linux} ES 2.0^{Linux}	No	10.6	256	MC	No	No
GMA 3000	2006	Desktop	Broadwater	Q963	2992	667	8	3.0 (SW) / 2.0	9.0c FL9_1	1.4; 2.1^{Linux} ES 2.0^{Linux}	No	10.6	256	MC	No	No
GMA 3000	2006	Desktop	Broadwater	Q965	2992	667	8	3.0 (SW) / 2.0	9.0c FL9_1	1.4; 2.1^{Linux} ES 2.0^{Linux}	No	12.8	256	MC	No	No
GMA X3000	2006	Desktop	Broadwater	G965	29A2	667	8	3.0	9.0c FL9_1	1.5; 2.1^{Linux} ES 2.0^{Linux}	No	12.8	384	Full	MC + (LF − WMV9 only)	No
GMA X3500	2007	Desktop	Bearlake	G35	2982	667	8	4.0	10.0; FL10_0	2.1; ES 2.0^{Linux}	No	12.8	384	Full	MC + LF	No
GMA X3100	2007	Mobile	Crestline	GL960	2A02; 2A12	400	8	4.0	10.0; FL10_0	2.1; ES 2.0^{Linux}	No	8.5	384	Full	MC + (LF − WMV9 only)	No
GMA X3100	2007	Mobile	Crestline	GLE960	2A02; 2A12	400	8	4.0	10.0; FL10_0	2.1; ES 2.0^{Linux}	No	8.5	384	Full	MC + (LF − WMV9 only)	No
GMA X3100	2007	Mobile	Crestline	GM965	2A02; 2A12	500	8	4.0	10.0; FL10_0	2.1; ES 2.0^{Linux}	No	10.7	384	Full	MC + (LF − WMV9 only)	No
GMA X3100	2007	Mobile	Crestline	GME965	2A02; 2A12	500	8	4.0	10.0; FL10_0	2.1; ES 2.0^{Linux}	No	10.7	384	Full	MC + (LF − WMV9 only)	No
GMA 4500	2008	Desktop	Eaglelake	B43	2E42; 2E92	533	10	4.0	10.0; FL10_0	2.1; ES 2.0^{Linux}	No	12.8 (DDR2); 17 (DDR3)	1720	Full	MC + LF	MC + LF
GMA 4500	2008	Desktop	Eaglelake	Q43	2E12	533	10	4.0	10.0; FL10_0	2.1; ES 2.0^{Linux}	No	12.8 (DDR2); 17 (DDR3)	1720	Full	MC + LF	MC + LF
GMA 4500	2008	Desktop	Eaglelake	Q45	2E12	533	10	4.0	10.0; FL10_0	2.1; ES 2.0^{Linux}	No	12.8 (DDR2); 17 (DDR3)	1720	Full	MC + LF	MC + LF
GMA X4500	2008	Desktop	Eaglelake	G41	2E32	800	10	4.0	10.0; FL10_0	2.1; ES 2.0^{Linux}	No	12.8 (DDR2); 17 (DDR3)	1720	Full	MC + LF	MC + LF
GMA X4500	2008	Desktop	Eaglelake	G43	2E22	800	10	4.0	10.0; FL10_0	2.1; ES 2.0^{Linux}	No	12.8 (DDR2); 17 (DDR3)	1720	Full	MC + LF	MC + LF
GMA X4500HD	2008	Desktop	Eaglelake	G45	2E22	800	10	4.0	10.0; FL10_0	2.1; ES 2.0^{Linux}	No	12.8 (DDR2); 17 (DDR3)	1720	Full	Full	Full
GMA 4500MHD	2008	Mobile	Cantiga	GL40	2A42	400	10	4.0	10.0; FL10_0	2.1; ES 2.0^{Linux}	No	12.8 (DDR2); 17 (DDR3)	1720	Full	Full	Full
GMA 4500MHD	2008	Mobile	Cantiga	GS40	2A42	400	10	4.0	10.0; FL10_0	2.1; ES 2.0^{Linux}	No	12.8 (DDR2); 17 (DDR3)	1720	Full	Full	Full
GMA 4500MHD	2008	Mobile	Cantiga	GM45	2A42	533	10	4.0	10.0; FL10_0	2.1; ES 2.0^{Linux}	No	12.8 (DDR2); 17 (DDR3)	1720	Full	Full	Full
GMA 4500MHD	2008	Mobile	Cantiga	GS45	2A42	533	10	4.0	10.0; FL10_0	2.1; ES 2.0^{Linux}	No	12.8 (DDR2); 17 (DDR3)	1720	Full	Full	Full
GMA 4500MHD	2008	Mobile	Cantiga	GM47	2A42	640	10	4.0	10.0; FL10_0	2.1; ES 2.0^{Linux}	No	12.8 (DDR2); 17 (DDR3)	1720	Full	Full	Full

== Gen5 ==
- Integrated graphics chip moved from motherboard into the processor.
- Improved gaming performance
- Can access CPU's cache
- Each EU has a 128-bit wide FPU that natively executes eight 16-bit or four 32-bit operations per clock cycle.
- Hierarchical-Z compression and fast Z clear

Specifications of Intel Gen5 graphics processing units
Name	Launch	Market	Processor		Device ID	Execution units	Core clock (MHz)	Memory		API support			Intel Clear Video HD
Name	Launch	Market	Code name	Model	Device ID	Execution units	Core clock (MHz)	DVMT (MB)	Bandwidth (GB/s)	Direct3D	OpenGL	OpenCL	Intel Clear Video HD
HD Graphics	2010	Desktop	Ironlake (Clarkdale)	Celeron G1101	0042	12	533	1720	17	10.1; FL10_0	2.1; ES 2.0^{Linux}	No	No
HD Graphics	2010	Desktop	Ironlake (Clarkdale)	Core i3-5x0	0042	12	733	1720	21.3	10.1; FL10_0	2.1; ES 2.0^{Linux}	No	Yes
HD Graphics	2010	Desktop	Ironlake (Clarkdale)	Core i5-6x0	0042	12	733	1720	21.3	10.1; FL10_0	2.1; ES 2.0^{Linux}	No	Yes
HD Graphics	2010	Desktop	Ironlake (Clarkdale)	Core i5-655K	0042	12	733	1720	21.3	10.1; FL10_0	2.1; ES 2.0^{Linux}	No	Yes
HD Graphics	2010	Desktop	Ironlake (Clarkdale)	Core i5-661	0042	12	900	1720	21.3	10.1; FL10_0	2.1; ES 2.0^{Linux}	No	Yes
HD Graphics	2010	Laptop	Ironlake (Arrandale)	Celeron U3xxx	0046	12	166–500	1720	12.8	10.1; FL10_0	2.1; ES 2.0^{Linux}	No	No
HD Graphics	2010	Laptop	Ironlake (Arrandale)	Pentium U5xxx	0046	12	166–500	1720	12.8	10.1; FL10_0	2.1; ES 2.0^{Linux}	No	No
HD Graphics	2010	Laptop	Ironlake (Arrandale)	Core i3-3x0UM	0046	12	166–500	1720	12.8	10.1; FL10_0	2.1; ES 2.0^{Linux}	No	Yes
HD Graphics	2010	Laptop	Ironlake (Arrandale)	Core i5-5x0UM	0046	12	166–500	1720	12.8	10.1; FL10_0	2.1; ES 2.0^{Linux}	No	Yes
HD Graphics	2010	Laptop	Ironlake (Arrandale)	Core i7-6x0UE	0046	12	166–500	1720	12.8	10.1; FL10_0	2.1; ES 2.0^{Linux}	No	Yes
HD Graphics	2010	Laptop	Ironlake (Arrandale)	Core i7-6x0UM	0046	12	166–500	1720	12.8	10.1; FL10_0	2.1; ES 2.0^{Linux}	No	Yes
HD Graphics	2010	Laptop	Ironlake (Arrandale)	Core i7-620LE	0046	12	266–566	1720	17.1	10.1; FL10_0	2.1; ES 2.0^{Linux}	No	Yes
HD Graphics	2010	Laptop	Ironlake (Arrandale)	Core i7-6x0LM	0046	12	266–566	1720	17.1	10.1; FL10_0	2.1; ES 2.0^{Linux}	No	Yes
HD Graphics	2010	Laptop	Ironlake (Arrandale)	Celeron P4xxx	0046	12	500–667	1720	17.1	10.1; FL10_0	2.1; ES 2.0^{Linux}	No	No
HD Graphics	2010	Laptop	Ironlake (Arrandale)	Pentium P6xxx	0046	12	500–667	1720	17.1	10.1; FL10_0	2.1; ES 2.0^{Linux}	No	No
HD Graphics	2010	Laptop	Ironlake (Arrandale)	Core i3-330E	0046	12	500–667	1720	17.1	10.1; FL10_0	2.1; ES 2.0^{Linux}	No	Yes
HD Graphics	2010	Laptop	Ironlake (Arrandale)	Core i3-3x0M	0046	12	500–667	1720	17.1	10.1; FL10_0	2.1; ES 2.0^{Linux}	No	Yes
HD Graphics	2010	Laptop	Ironlake (Arrandale)	Core i5-4x0M	0046	12	500–766	1720	17.1	10.1; FL10_0	2.1; ES 2.0^{Linux}	No	Yes
HD Graphics	2010	Laptop	Ironlake (Arrandale)	Core i5-520E	0046	12	500–766	1720	17.1	10.1; FL10_0	2.1; ES 2.0^{Linux}	No	Yes
HD Graphics	2010	Laptop	Ironlake (Arrandale)	Core i5-5x0M	0046	12	500–766	1720	17.1	10.1; FL10_0	2.1; ES 2.0^{Linux}	No	Yes
HD Graphics	2010	Laptop	Ironlake (Arrandale)	Core i7-610E	0046	12	500–766	1720	17.1	10.1; FL10_0	2.1; ES 2.0^{Linux}	No	Yes
HD Graphics	2010	Laptop	Ironlake (Arrandale)	Core i7-6x0M	0046	12	500–766	1720	17.1	10.1; FL10_0	2.1; ES 2.0^{Linux}	No	Yes

== Gen6 ==
- Each EU has a 128-bit wide FPU that natively executes eight 16-bit or four 32-bit operations per clock cycle.
- Double peak performance per clock cycle compared to previous generation due to fused multiply-add instruction.
- The entire GPU shares a sampler and an ROP.

Specifications of Intel HD Graphics series
Graphics	Launch	Market	Processor	Code name	Device id.	Core clock (MHz)	Execution units	API support			Memory bandwidth (GB/s)	DVMT (MB)	QSV
Graphics	Launch	Market	Processor	Code name	Device id.	Core clock (MHz)	Execution units	Direct3D	OpenGL	OpenCL	Memory bandwidth (GB/s)	DVMT (MB)	QSV
HD Graphics	2011	Mobile	Celeron B7x0; Celeron 7x7 Celeron 8x7 Celeron B8xx; Pentium B9x0; Pentium 9x7	Sandy Bridge	010A	350–1150	6 (GT1)	10.1; 11.1^{Windows 8+} FL10_1	3.1^{Windows} 3.3^{macOS} 3.3^{Linux} ES 3.0^{Linux}	No	21.3	1720	No
HD Graphics	2011	Desktop	Celeron G4x0; Celeron G5x0; Celeron G530T; Pentium G6xx; Pentium G6x0T; Pentium G8x0	Sandy Bridge	010A	650–1100	6 (GT1)	10.1; 11.1^{Windows 8+} FL10_1	3.1^{Windows} 3.3^{macOS} 3.3^{Linux} ES 3.0^{Linux}	No	21.3	1720	No
HD Graphics 2000	2011	Desktop	Core i3-2102 Core i3-21x0 Core i3-21x0T; Core i5-2xx0 Core i5-2x00S; Core i5-2xx0T; Core i7-2600 Core i7-2600S	Sandy Bridge	0102	650–1350	6 (GT1)	10.1; 11.1^{Windows 8+} FL10_1	3.1^{Windows} 3.3^{macOS} 3.3^{Linux} ES 3.0^{Linux}	No	21.3	1720	Yes
HD Graphics 2000	2011	Workstation	Xeon E3-1260L	Sandy Bridge	0102	650–1350	6 (GT1)	10.1; 11.1^{Windows 8+} FL10_1	3.1^{Windows} 3.3^{macOS} 3.3^{Linux} ES 3.0^{Linux}	No	21.3	1720	Yes
HD Graphics 3000	2011	Mobile	Core i3-23x0E; Core i3-23xxM; Core i5-251xE; Core i5-2xxxM; Core i7-2xxxM; Core i7-2xxxQM; Core i7-271xQE; Core i7-29x0XM	Sandy Bridge	0116; 0126	650–1300	12 (GT2)	10.1; 11.1^{Windows 8+} FL10_1	3.1^{Windows} 3.3^{macOS} 3.3^{Linux} ES 3.0^{Linux}	No	21.3	1720	Yes
HD Graphics 3000	2011	Desktop	Core i3-21x5 Core i5-2405S; Core i5-2500K; Core i7-2x00K	Sandy Bridge	0112; 0122	850–1350	12 (GT2)	10.1; 11.1^{Windows 8+} FL10_1	3.1^{Windows} 3.3^{macOS} 3.3^{Linux} ES 3.0^{Linux}	No	21.3	1720	Yes
HD Graphics P3000	2011	Workstation	Xeon E3-12x5	Sandy Bridge	0112; 0122	850–1350	12 (GT2)	10.1; 11.1^{Windows 8+} FL10_1	3.1^{Windows} 3.3^{macOS} 3.3^{Linux} ES 3.0^{Linux}	No	21.3	1720	Yes

== Gen7 ==
- ^{1} FP32 ALUs : EUs : Subslices
- Each EU contains 2 × 128-bit FPUs and has double peak performance per clock cycle compared to previous generation. One supports FP32 and FP64, and the other supports only FP32. Since the throughput of FP64 instructions are 2 cycles, the FP64 FLOPS is a quarter of the FP32 FLOPS. Only one of the FPUs supports 32-bit integer instructions.
- Each Subslice contains 6 or 8 (or 10 in Haswell GPUs) EUs and a sampler, and has 64 KB shared memory.

Specifications of Intel HD Graphics series
Graphics	Launch	Market	Processor	Code name	Device ID	Core clock (MHz)	Core config^{1}	API support				Memory bandwidth (GB/s)	DVMT (MB)	QSV
Graphics	Launch	Market	Processor	Code name	Device ID	Core clock (MHz)	Core config^{1}	Direct3D	OpenGL	OpenCL	Vulkan	Memory bandwidth (GB/s)	DVMT (MB)	QSV
HD Graphics	2012	Desktop	Celeron G16x0; Celeron G1610T; Pentium G2xx0; Pentium G2xx0T	Ivy Bridge	015A	650–1050	48:6:1 (GT1)	11.1; FL11_0	4.0^{Windows} 4.1^{macOS} 4.2^{Linux} ES 3.0^{Linux}	1.2	1.0^{Linux}	25.6	1720	No
HD Graphics	2012	Mobile	Celeron 10x0M; Celeron 10x7U; Pentium 2117U; Pentium 20x0M	Ivy Bridge	015A	350–1100	48:6:1 (GT1)	11.1; FL11_0	4.0^{Windows} 4.1^{macOS} 4.2^{Linux} ES 3.0^{Linux}	1.2	1.0^{Linux}	25.6	1720	No
HD Graphics 2500	2012	Workstation	Xeon E3-1265LV2	Ivy Bridge	0152	650–1150	48:6:1 (GT1)	11.1; FL11_0	4.0^{Windows} 4.1^{macOS} 4.2^{Linux} ES 3.0^{Linux}	1.2	1.0^{Linux}	25.6	1720	Yes
HD Graphics 2500	2012	Desktop	Core i3-32x0 Core i3-32x0T; Core i5-3xx0 Core i5-3xx0S; Core i5-3xx0T	Ivy Bridge	0152	650–1150	48:6:1 (GT1)	11.1; FL11_0	4.0^{Windows} 4.1^{macOS} 4.2^{Linux} ES 3.0^{Linux}	1.2	1.0^{Linux}	25.6	1720	Yes
HD Graphics 4000	2012	Desktop	Core i3-3225 Core i3-3245 Core i5-3475S; Core i5-3570K; Core i7-3770 Core i7-3770x	Ivy Bridge	0162	650–1150	128:16:2 (GT2)	11.1; FL11_0	4.0^{Windows} 4.1^{macOS} 4.2^{Linux} ES 3.0^{Linux}	1.2	1.0^{Linux}	25.6	1720	Yes
HD Graphics 4000	2012	Mobile	Core i3-3110M	Ivy Bridge	0166	650–1000	128:16:2 (GT2)	11.1; FL11_0	4.0^{Windows} 4.1^{macOS} 4.2^{Linux} ES 3.0^{Linux}	1.2	1.0^{Linux}	25.6	1720	Yes
HD Graphics 4000	2012	Mobile	Core i3-3120M; Core i5-3210M	Ivy Bridge	0166	650–1100	128:16:2 (GT2)	11.1; FL11_0	4.0^{Windows} 4.1^{macOS} 4.2^{Linux} ES 3.0^{Linux}	1.2	1.0^{Linux}	25.6	1720	Yes
HD Graphics 4000	2012	Mobile	Core i3-3120ME	Ivy Bridge	0166	650–900	128:16:2 (GT2)	11.1; FL11_0	4.0^{Windows} 4.1^{macOS} 4.2^{Linux} ES 3.0^{Linux}	1.2	1.0^{Linux}	25.6	1720	Yes
HD Graphics 4000	2012	Mobile	Core i3-3217U; Core i5-3317U	Ivy Bridge	0166	350–1050	128:16:2 (GT2)	11.1; FL11_0	4.0^{Windows} 4.1^{macOS} 4.2^{Linux} ES 3.0^{Linux}	1.2	1.0^{Linux}	25.6	1720	Yes
HD Graphics 4000	2012	Mobile	Core i3-3217UE	Ivy Bridge	0166	350–900	128:16:2 (GT2)	11.1; FL11_0	4.0^{Windows} 4.1^{macOS} 4.2^{Linux} ES 3.0^{Linux}	1.2	1.0^{Linux}	25.6	1720	Yes
HD Graphics 4000	2012	Mobile	Core i3-3229Y; Core i5-3339Y; Core i5-3439Y	Ivy Bridge	0166	350–850	128:16:2 (GT2)	11.1; FL11_0	4.0^{Windows} 4.1^{macOS} 4.2^{Linux} ES 3.0^{Linux}	1.2	1.0^{Linux}	25.6	1720	Yes
HD Graphics 4000	2012	Mobile	Core i5-33x0M	Ivy Bridge	0166	650–1200	128:16:2 (GT2)	11.1; FL11_0	4.0^{Windows} 4.1^{macOS} 4.2^{Linux} ES 3.0^{Linux}	1.2	1.0^{Linux}	25.6	1720	Yes
HD Graphics 4000	2012	Mobile	Core i5-3337U	Ivy Bridge	0166	350–1100	128:16:2 (GT2)	11.1; FL11_0	4.0^{Windows} 4.1^{macOS} 4.2^{Linux} ES 3.0^{Linux}	1.2	1.0^{Linux}	25.6	1720	Yes
HD Graphics 4000	2012	Mobile	Core i5-3427U	Ivy Bridge	0166	350–1150	128:16:2 (GT2)	11.1; FL11_0	4.0^{Windows} 4.1^{macOS} 4.2^{Linux} ES 3.0^{Linux}	1.2	1.0^{Linux}	25.6	1720	Yes
HD Graphics 4000	2012	Mobile	Core i5-3610ME	Ivy Bridge	0166	650–950	128:16:2 (GT2)	11.1; FL11_0	4.0^{Windows} 4.1^{macOS} 4.2^{Linux} ES 3.0^{Linux}	1.2	1.0^{Linux}	25.6	1720	Yes
HD Graphics 4000	2012	Mobile	Core i7-3520M; Core i7-3xx7U; Core i7-3xxxQM; Core i7-3920XM	Ivy Bridge	0166	350–1300	128:16:2 (GT2)	11.1; FL11_0	4.0^{Windows} 4.1^{macOS} 4.2^{Linux} ES 3.0^{Linux}	1.2	1.0^{Linux}	25.6	1720	Yes
HD Graphics P4000	2012	Workstation	Xeon E3-12x5V2	Ivy Bridge	016A	650–1250	128:16:2 (GT2)	11.1; FL11_0	4.0^{Windows} 4.1^{macOS} 4.2^{Linux} ES 3.0^{Linux}	1.2	1.0^{Linux}	25.6	1720	Yes

== Gen7.5 ==
- ^{1} FP32 ALUs : EUs : Subslices
- Each EU contains 2 × 128-bit FPUs and has double peak performance per clock cycle compared to previous generation. One supports FP32 and FP64, and the other supports only FP32. Since the throughput of FP64 instructions are 2 cycles, the FP64 FLOPS is a quarter of the FP32 FLOPS. Only one of the FPUs supports 32-bit integer instructions.
- Each Subslice contains 6 or 8 (or 10 in Haswell GPUs) EUs and a sampler, and has 64 KB shared memory.

Graphics	Launch	Market	Processor	Code name	Device ID	Core clock (MHz)	Core config^{1}	API support				Memory bandwidth (GB/s)	DVMT (MB)	QSV
Graphics	Launch	Market	Processor	Code name	Device ID	Core clock (MHz)	Core config^{1}	Direct3D	OpenGL	OpenCL	Vulkan	Memory bandwidth (GB/s)	DVMT (MB)	QSV
HD Graphics	2013	Tablet	Atom Z3735D; Atom Z3735E; Atom Z3735F; Atom Z3735G; Atom Z3736F; Atom Z3736G	Valleyview (Bay Trail)	0F30; 0F31; 0F32; 0F33; 0155; 0157	311-646	32:4:1	11	4.0; ES 2.0/1.1^{Linux}	1.2	1.0^{Linux}	10.7	2048	
HD Graphics	2013	Tablet	Atom Z3680	Valleyview (Bay Trail)	0F30; 0F31; 0F32; 0F33; 0155; 0157	311-667	32:4:1	11	4.0; ES 2.0/1.1^{Linux}	1.2	1.0^{Linux}	8.5	2048	
HD Graphics	2013	Tablet	Atom Z3740; Atom Z3770	Valleyview (Bay Trail)	0F30; 0F31; 0F32; 0F33; 0155; 0157	311-667	32:4:1	11	4.0; ES 2.0/1.1^{Linux}	1.2	1.0^{Linux}	17.1	2048	
HD Graphics	2013	Tablet	Atom Z3680D; Atom Z3740D; Atom Z3770D	Valleyview (Bay Trail)	0F30; 0F31; 0F32; 0F33; 0155; 0157	313-688	32:4:1	11	4.0; ES 2.0/1.1^{Linux}	1.2	1.0^{Linux}	10.7	2048	
HD Graphics	2013	Tablet	Atom Z3745; Atom Z3775; Atom Z3795	Valleyview (Bay Trail)	0F30; 0F31; 0F32; 0F33; 0155; 0157	311-778	32:4:1	11	4.0; ES 2.0/1.1^{Linux}	1.2	1.0^{Linux}	17.1	2048	
HD Graphics	2013	Tablet	Atom Z3745D; Atom Z3775D	Valleyview (Bay Trail)	0F30; 0F31; 0F32; 0F33; 0155; 0157	311-792	32:4:1	11	4.0; ES 2.0/1.1^{Linux}	1.2	1.0^{Linux}	10.7	2048	
HD Graphics	2013	Tablet	Atom Z3785	Valleyview (Bay Trail)	0F30; 0F31; 0F32; 0F33; 0155; 0157	313-833	32:4:1	11	4.0; ES 2.0/1.1^{Linux}	1.2	1.0^{Linux}	21.3	2048	
HD Graphics	2013	Laptop	Celeron N2805	Valleyview (Bay Trail)	0F30; 0F31; 0F32; 0F33; 0155; 0157	313-667	32:4:1	11.2	4.0^{Windows} 4.2^{Linux} ES 3.0^{Linux}	1.2	1.0^{Linux}	8.5	2048	
HD Graphics	2013	Laptop	Celeron N2807	Valleyview (Bay Trail)	0F30; 0F31; 0F32; 0F33; 0155; 0157	313-750	32:4:1	11.2	4.0^{Windows} 4.2^{Linux} ES 3.0^{Linux}	1.2	1.0^{Linux}	10.7	2048	
HD Graphics	2013	Laptop	Celeron N2830; Pentium N3510	Valleyview (Bay Trail)	0F30; 0F31; 0F32; 0F33; 0155; 0157	313-750	32:4:1	11.2	4.0^{Windows} 4.2^{Linux} ES 3.0^{Linux}	1.2	1.0^{Linux}	21.3	2048	
HD Graphics	2013	Laptop	Celeron N2806	Valleyview (Bay Trail)	0F30; 0F31; 0F32; 0F33; 0155; 0157	313-756	32:4:1	11.2	4.0^{Windows} 4.2^{Linux} ES 3.0^{Linux}	1.2	1.0^{Linux}	8.5	2048	
HD Graphics	2013	Laptop	Celeron N2810; Celeron N2815; Celeron N2820; Celeron N2910	Valleyview (Bay Trail)	0F30; 0F31; 0F32; 0F33; 0155; 0157	313-756	32:4:1	11.2	4.0^{Windows} 4.2^{Linux} ES 3.0^{Linux}	1.2	1.0^{Linux}	17.1	2048	
HD Graphics	2013	Laptop	Celeron N2808	Valleyview (Bay Trail)	0F30; 0F31; 0F32; 0F33; 0155; 0157	311-792	32:4:1	11.2	4.0^{Windows} 4.2^{Linux} ES 3.0^{Linux}	1.2	1.0^{Linux}	10.7	2048	
HD Graphics	2013	Laptop	Celeron N2840	Valleyview (Bay Trail)	0F30; 0F31; 0F32; 0F33; 0155; 0157	311-792	32:4:1	11.2	4.0^{Windows} 4.2^{Linux} ES 3.0^{Linux}	1.2	1.0^{Linux}	21.3	2048	
HD Graphics	2013	Laptop	Celeron N2920	Valleyview (Bay Trail)	0F30; 0F31; 0F32; 0F33; 0155; 0157	313-844	32:4:1	11.2	4.0^{Windows} 4.2^{Linux} ES 3.0^{Linux}	1.2	1.0^{Linux}	17.1	2048	
HD Graphics	2013	Laptop	Celeron N2930; Celeron N2940; Pentium N3520	Valleyview (Bay Trail)	0F30; 0F31; 0F32; 0F33; 0155; 0157	313-854	32:4:1	11.2	4.0^{Windows} 4.2^{Linux} ES 3.0^{Linux}	1.2	1.0^{Linux}	21.3	2048	
HD Graphics	2013	Laptop	Pentium N3530; Pentium N3540	Valleyview (Bay Trail)	0F30; 0F31; 0F32; 0F33; 0155; 0157	313-896	32:4:1	11.2	4.0^{Windows} 4.2^{Linux} ES 3.0^{Linux}	1.2	1.0^{Linux}	21.3	2048	
HD Graphics	2013	Embedded	Atom E3815	Valleyview (Bay Trail)	0F30; 0F31; 0F32; 0F33; 0155; 0157	400-400	32:4:1	11.2	4.0^{Windows} 4.2^{Linux} ES 3.0^{Linux}	1.2	1.0^{Linux}	8.5	2048	
HD Graphics	2013	Embedded	Atom E3825	Valleyview (Bay Trail)	0F30; 0F31; 0F32; 0F33; 0155; 0157	533-533	32:4:1	11.2	4.0^{Windows} 4.2^{Linux} ES 3.0^{Linux}	1.2	1.0^{Linux}	8.5	2048	
HD Graphics	2013	Embedded	Atom E3826	Valleyview (Bay Trail)	0F30; 0F31; 0F32; 0F33; 0155; 0157	533-667	32:4:1	11.2	4.0^{Windows} 4.2^{Linux} ES 3.0^{Linux}	1.2	1.0^{Linux}	17.1	2048	
HD Graphics	2013	Embedded	Atom E3827; Atom E3845	Valleyview (Bay Trail)	0F30; 0F31; 0F32; 0F33; 0155; 0157	542-792	32:4:1	11.2	4.0^{Windows} 4.2^{Linux} ES 3.0^{Linux}	1.2	1.0^{Linux}	21.3	2048	
HD Graphics	2013	Desktop	Celeron J1750	Valleyview (Bay Trail)	0F30; 0F31; 0F32; 0F33; 0155; 0157	688-750	32:4:1	11.2	4.0^{Windows} 4.2^{Linux} ES 3.0^{Linux}	1.2	1.0^{Linux}	21.3	2048	
HD Graphics	2013	Desktop	Celeron J1800; Celeron J1850	Valleyview (Bay Trail)	0F30; 0F31; 0F32; 0F33; 0155; 0157	688-792	32:4:1	11.2	4.0^{Windows} 4.2^{Linux} ES 3.0^{Linux}	1.2	1.0^{Linux}	21.3	2048	
HD Graphics	2013	Desktop	Celeron J1900; Pentium J2850	Valleyview (Bay Trail)	0F30; 0F31; 0F32; 0F33; 0155; 0157	688-854	32:4:1	11.2	4.0^{Windows} 4.2^{Linux} ES 3.0^{Linux}	1.2	1.0^{Linux}	21.3	2048	
HD Graphics	2013	Desktop	Pentium J2900	Valleyview (Bay Trail)	0F30; 0F31; 0F32; 0F33; 0155; 0157	688-896	32:4:1	11.2	4.0^{Windows} 4.2^{Linux} ES 3.0^{Linux}	1.2	1.0^{Linux}	21.3	2048	
HD Graphics	2013	Mobile	Pentium A1020	Valleyview (Bay Trail)	0F30; 0F31; 0F32; 0F33; 0155; 0157	688-896	32:4:1	11.2	4.0^{Windows} 4.2^{Linux} ES 3.0^{Linux}	1.2	1.0^{Linux}	21.3	2048	
HD Graphics	2013	Desktop	Pentium G3xxx	Haswell	0402; 0406; 040A; 040B; 040E ULT: 0A02; 0A06; 0A0A; 0A0B; 0A0E	350–1150	80:10:1 (GT1)	12; FL11_1	4.3^{Windows} 4.1^{macOS} 4.6^{Linux} ES 3.2^{Linux}	1.2	1.0^{Linux}	25.6	2048	
HD Graphics	2013	Desktop	Pentium G3xxxT	Haswell	0402; 0406; 040A; 040B; 040E ULT: 0A02; 0A06; 0A0A; 0A0B; 0A0E	200–1100	80:10:1 (GT1)	12; FL11_1	4.3^{Windows} 4.1^{macOS} 4.6^{Linux} ES 3.2^{Linux}	1.2	1.0^{Linux}	25.6	2048	
HD Graphics	2013	Desktop	Celeron G18xx	Haswell	0402; 0406; 040A; 040B; 040E ULT: 0A02; 0A06; 0A0A; 0A0B; 0A0E	350-1050	80:10:1 (GT1)	12; FL11_1	4.3^{Windows} 4.1^{macOS} 4.6^{Linux} ES 3.2^{Linux}	1.2	1.0^{Linux}	25.6	2048	
HD Graphics	2013	Desktop	Celeron G18xxT	Haswell	0402; 0406; 040A; 040B; 040E ULT: 0A02; 0A06; 0A0A; 0A0B; 0A0E	200-1050	80:10:1 (GT1)	12; FL11_1	4.3^{Windows} 4.1^{macOS} 4.6^{Linux} ES 3.2^{Linux}	1.2	1.0^{Linux}	25.6	2048	
HD Graphics	2013	Mobile	Celeron 2950M; Pentium 3550M	Haswell	0402; 0406; 040A; 040B; 040E ULT: 0A02; 0A06; 0A0A; 0A0B; 0A0E	400–1100	80:10:1 (GT1)	12; FL11_1	4.3^{Windows} 4.1^{macOS} 4.6^{Linux} ES 3.2^{Linux}	1.2	1.0^{Linux}	25.6	2048	
HD Graphics	2013	Mobile	Celeron 29xxU; Pentium 35xxU	Haswell	0402; 0406; 040A; 040B; 040E ULT: 0A02; 0A06; 0A0A; 0A0B; 0A0E	200–1000	80:10:1 (GT1)	12; FL11_1	4.3^{Windows} 4.1^{macOS} 4.6^{Linux} ES 3.2^{Linux}	1.2	1.0^{Linux}	25.6	2048	
HD Graphics	2013	Mobile	Celeron 29xxY; Pentium 35xxY	Haswell	0402; 0406; 040A; 040B; 040E ULT: 0A02; 0A06; 0A0A; 0A0B; 0A0E	200–850	80:10:1 (GT1)	12; FL11_1	4.3^{Windows} 4.1^{macOS} 4.6^{Linux} ES 3.2^{Linux}	1.2	1.0^{Linux}	25.6	2048	
HD Graphics 4200	2013	ULT; Mobile	Core i3-40xxY; Core i5-4xxxY; Core i7-4610Y	Haswell	0412; 0416; 041A; 041B; 041E ULT: 0A12; 0A16; 0A1A; 0A1B; 0A1E	200–850	160:20:2 (GT2)	12; FL11_1	4.3^{Windows} 4.1^{macOS} 4.6^{Linux} ES 3.2^{Linux}	1.2	1.0^{Linux}	25.6	2048	Yes
HD Graphics 4400	2013	Desktop	Core i3-4130 Core i3-4150 Core i3-4160 Core i3-4170	Haswell	0412; 0416; 041A; 041B; 041E ULT: 0A12; 0A16; 0A1A; 0A1B; 0A1E	350–1150	160:20:2 (GT2)	12; FL11_1	4.3^{Windows} 4.1^{macOS} 4.6^{Linux} ES 3.2^{Linux}	1.2	1.0^{Linux}	25.6	2048	Yes
HD Graphics 4400	2013	Desktop	Core i3-4130T; Core i3-4150T; Core i3-4160T; Core i3-4170T	Haswell	0412; 0416; 041A; 041B; 041E ULT: 0A12; 0A16; 0A1A; 0A1B; 0A1E	200–1150	160:20:2 (GT2)	12; FL11_1	4.3^{Windows} 4.1^{macOS} 4.6^{Linux} ES 3.2^{Linux}	1.2	1.0^{Linux}	25.6	2048	Yes
HD Graphics 4400	2013	Mobile	Core i3-4005U; Core i3-4025U	Haswell	0412; 0416; 041A; 041B; 041E ULT: 0A12; 0A16; 0A1A; 0A1B; 0A1E	200–950	160:20:2 (GT2)	12; FL11_1	4.3^{Windows} 4.1^{macOS} 4.6^{Linux} ES 3.2^{Linux}	1.2	1.0^{Linux}	25.6	2048	Yes
HD Graphics 4400	2013	Mobile	Core i3-4010U; Core i3-4100U; Core i5-4200U; Core i3-4030U; Core i3-4120U	Haswell	0412; 0416; 041A; 041B; 041E ULT: 0A12; 0A16; 0A1A; 0A1B; 0A1E	200–1000	160:20:2 (GT2)	12; FL11_1	4.3^{Windows} 4.1^{macOS} 4.6^{Linux} ES 3.2^{Linux}	1.2	1.0^{Linux}	25.6	2048	Yes
HD Graphics 4400	2013	Mobile	Core i5-4300U; Core i7-4500U; Core i7-4600U	Haswell	0412; 0416; 041A; 041B; 041E ULT: 0A12; 0A16; 0A1A; 0A1B; 0A1E	200–1100	160:20:2 (GT2)	12; FL11_1	4.3^{Windows} 4.1^{macOS} 4.6^{Linux} ES 3.2^{Linux}	1.2	1.0^{Linux}	25.6	2048	Yes
HD Graphics 4600	2013	Desktop	Core i3-4330 Core i3-4340 Core i5-4570 Core i5-4570S; Core i5-4590 Core i5-4590S; Core i5-4590T	Haswell	0412; 0416; 041A; 041B; 041E ULT: 0A12; 0A16; 0A1A; 0A1B; 0A1E	350-1150	160:20:2 (GT2)	12; FL11_1	4.3^{Windows} 4.1^{macOS} 4.6^{Linux} ES 3.2^{Linux}	1.2	1.0^{Linux}	25.6	2048	Yes
HD Graphics 4600	2013	Desktop	Core i3-4330T; Core i5-4570T	Haswell	0412; 0416; 041A; 041B; 041E ULT: 0A12; 0A16; 0A1A; 0A1B; 0A1E	200-1150	160:20:2 (GT2)	12; FL11_1	4.3^{Windows} 4.1^{macOS} 4.6^{Linux} ES 3.2^{Linux}	1.2	1.0^{Linux}	25.6	2048	Yes
HD Graphics 4600	2013	Desktop	Core i5-4430 Core i5-4430S; Core i5-4440 Core i5-4440S	Haswell	0412; 0416; 041A; 041B; 041E ULT: 0A12; 0A16; 0A1A; 0A1B; 0A1E	350–1100	160:20:2 (GT2)	12; FL11_1	4.3^{Windows} 4.1^{macOS} 4.6^{Linux} ES 3.2^{Linux}	1.2	1.0^{Linux}	25.6	2048	Yes
HD Graphics 4600	2013	Desktop	Core i5-4670 Core i5-4670K; Core i5-4670S; Core i5-4670T; Core i5-4690 Core i5-4690K; Core i5-4690S; Core i5-4690T; Core i7-4765T; Core i7-4770 Core i7-4770S; Core i7-4770T; Core i7-4771 Core i7-4790	Haswell	0412; 0416; 041A; 041B; 041E ULT: 0A12; 0A16; 0A1A; 0A1B; 0A1E	350–1200	160:20:2 (GT2)	12; FL11_1	4.3^{Windows} 4.1^{macOS} 4.6^{Linux} ES 3.2^{Linux}	1.2	1.0^{Linux}	25.6	2048	Yes
HD Graphics 4600	2013	Desktop	Core i7-4770K; Core i7-4790K	Haswell	0412; 0416; 041A; 041B; 041E ULT: 0A12; 0A16; 0A1A; 0A1B; 0A1E	350–1250	160:20:2 (GT2)	12; FL11_1	4.3^{Windows} 4.1^{macOS} 4.6^{Linux} ES 3.2^{Linux}	1.2	1.0^{Linux}	25.6	2048	Yes
HD Graphics 4600	2013	Mobile	Core i3-4xxxE; Core i5-4402E	Haswell	0412; 0416; 041A; 041B; 041E ULT: 0A12; 0A16; 0A1A; 0A1B; 0A1E	400–900	160:20:2 (GT2)	12; FL11_1	4.3^{Windows} 4.1^{macOS} 4.6^{Linux} ES 3.2^{Linux}	1.2	1.0^{Linux}	25.6	2048	Yes
HD Graphics 4600	2013	Mobile	Core i3-4xxxM	Haswell	0412; 0416; 041A; 041B; 041E ULT: 0A12; 0A16; 0A1A; 0A1B; 0A1E	400–1100	160:20:2 (GT2)	12; FL11_1	4.3^{Windows} 4.1^{macOS} 4.6^{Linux} ES 3.2^{Linux}	1.2	1.0^{Linux}	25.6	2048	Yes
HD Graphics 4600	2013	Mobile	Core i5-4200M; Core i5-4200H; Core i7-47xxMQ; Core i7-4702HQ	Haswell	0412; 0416; 041A; 041B; 041E ULT: 0A12; 0A16; 0A1A; 0A1B; 0A1E	400–1150	160:20:2 (GT2)	12; FL11_1	4.3^{Windows} 4.1^{macOS} 4.6^{Linux} ES 3.2^{Linux}	1.2	1.0^{Linux}	25.6	2048	Yes
HD Graphics 4600	2013	Mobile	Core i5-43xxM	Haswell	0412; 0416; 041A; 041B; 041E ULT: 0A12; 0A16; 0A1A; 0A1B; 0A1E	400–1250	160:20:2 (GT2)	12; FL11_1	4.3^{Windows} 4.1^{macOS} 4.6^{Linux} ES 3.2^{Linux}	1.2	1.0^{Linux}	25.6	2048	Yes
HD Graphics 4600	2013	Mobile	Core i5-4400E; Core i7-4700EQ	Haswell	0412; 0416; 041A; 041B; 041E ULT: 0A12; 0A16; 0A1A; 0A1B; 0A1E	400–1000	160:20:2 (GT2)	12; FL11_1	4.3^{Windows} 4.1^{macOS} 4.6^{Linux} ES 3.2^{Linux}	1.2	1.0^{Linux}	25.6	2048	Yes
HD Graphics 4600	2013	Mobile	Core i7-4700HQ	Haswell	0412; 0416; 041A; 041B; 041E ULT: 0A12; 0A16; 0A1A; 0A1B; 0A1E	400–1200	160:20:2 (GT2)	12; FL11_1	4.3^{Windows} 4.1^{macOS} 4.6^{Linux} ES 3.2^{Linux}	1.2	1.0^{Linux}	25.6	2048	Yes
HD Graphics 4600	2013	Mobile	Core i7-4xxxM; Core i7-4800MQ; Core i7-4900MQ	Haswell	0412; 0416; 041A; 041B; 041E ULT: 0A12; 0A16; 0A1A; 0A1B; 0A1E	400–1300	160:20:2 (GT2)	12; FL11_1	4.3^{Windows} 4.1^{macOS} 4.6^{Linux} ES 3.2^{Linux}	1.2	1.0^{Linux}	25.6	2048	Yes
HD Graphics 4600	2013	Mobile	Core i7-4930MX	Haswell	0412; 0416; 041A; 041B; 041E ULT: 0A12; 0A16; 0A1A; 0A1B; 0A1E	400–1350	160:20:2 (GT2)	12; FL11_1	4.3^{Windows} 4.1^{macOS} 4.6^{Linux} ES 3.2^{Linux}	1.2	1.0^{Linux}	25.6	2048	Yes
HD Graphics P4600	2013	Workstation	Xeon E3-1225 v3 Xeon E3-1226 v3 Xeon E3-1245 v3 Xeon E3-1246 v3	Haswell	0412; 0416; 041A; 041B; 041E ULT: 0A12; 0A16; 0A1A; 0A1B; 0A1E	350–1200	160:20:2 (GT2)	12; FL11_1	4.3^{Windows} 4.1^{macOS} 4.6^{Linux} ES 3.2^{Linux}	1.2	1.0^{Linux}	25.6	2048	Yes
HD Graphics P4600	2013	Workstation	Xeon E3-1275 v3 Xeon E3-1276 v3	Haswell	0412; 0416; 041A; 041B; 041E ULT: 0A12; 0A16; 0A1A; 0A1B; 0A1E	350–1250	160:20:2 (GT2)	12; FL11_1	4.3^{Windows} 4.1^{macOS} 4.6^{Linux} ES 3.2^{Linux}	1.2	1.0^{Linux}	25.6	2048	Yes
HD Graphics P4700	2013	Workstation	Xeon E3-1285L v3 Xeon E3-1286L v3	Haswell	0412; 0416; 041A; 041B; 041E ULT: 0A12; 0A16; 0A1A; 0A1B; 0A1E	350–1250	160:20:2 (GT2)	12; FL11_1	4.3^{Windows} 4.1^{macOS} 4.6^{Linux} ES 3.2^{Linux}	1.2	1.0^{Linux}	25.6	2048	Yes
HD Graphics P4700	2013	Workstation	Xeon E3-1285 v3 Xeon E3-1286 v3	Haswell	0412; 0416; 041A; 041B; 041E ULT: 0A12; 0A16; 0A1A; 0A1B; 0A1E	350–1300	160:20:2 (GT2)	12; FL11_1	4.3^{Windows} 4.1^{macOS} 4.6^{Linux} ES 3.2^{Linux}	1.2	1.0^{Linux}	25.6	2048	Yes
HD Graphics 5000	2013	ULT; Mobile	Core i5-4250U	Haswell	0422; 0426; 042A; 042B; 042E ULT: 0A22; 0A26; 0A2A; 0A2B; 0A2E	200–1000	320:40:4 (GT3)	12; FL11_1	4.3^{Windows} 4.1^{macOS} 4.6^{Linux} ES 3.2^{Linux}	1.2	1.0^{Linux}	25.6	2048	Yes
HD Graphics 5000	2013	ULT; Mobile	Core i5-4350U; Core i7-4550U; Core i7-4650U	Haswell	0422; 0426; 042A; 042B; 042E ULT: 0A22; 0A26; 0A2A; 0A2B; 0A2E	200–1100	320:40:4 (GT3)	12; FL11_1	4.3^{Windows} 4.1^{macOS} 4.6^{Linux} ES 3.2^{Linux}	1.2	1.0^{Linux}	25.6	2048	Yes
Iris Graphics 5100	2013	ULT; Mobile	Core i3-4158U; Core i5-4258U	Haswell	0422; 0426; 042A; 042B; 042E ULT: 0A22; 0A26; 0A2A; 0A2B; 0A2E	200–1100	320:40:4 (GT3)	12; FL11_1	4.3^{Windows} 4.1^{macOS} 4.6^{Linux} ES 3.2^{Linux}	1.2	1.0^{Linux}	25.6	2048	Yes
Iris Graphics 5100	2013	ULT; Mobile	Core i5-4288U; Core i7-4558U	Haswell	0422; 0426; 042A; 042B; 042E ULT: 0A22; 0A26; 0A2A; 0A2B; 0A2E	200–1200	320:40:4 (GT3)	12; FL11_1	4.3^{Windows} 4.1^{macOS} 4.6^{Linux} ES 3.2^{Linux}	1.2	1.0^{Linux}	25.6	2048	Yes
Iris Pro Graphics 5200	2013	Desktop	Core i5-4570R	Haswell	0D22; 0D26; 0D2A; 0D2B; 0D2E	200–1150	320:40:4 + eDRAM (GT3e)	12; FL11_1	4.3^{Windows} 4.1^{macOS} 4.6^{Linux} ES 3.2^{Linux}	1.2	1.0^{Linux}	25.6	2048	Yes
Iris Pro Graphics 5200	2013	Desktop	Core i5-4670R; Core i7-4770R	Haswell	0D22; 0D26; 0D2A; 0D2B; 0D2E	200–1300	320:40:4 + eDRAM (GT3e)	12; FL11_1	4.3^{Windows} 4.1^{macOS} 4.6^{Linux} ES 3.2^{Linux}	1.2	1.0^{Linux}	25.6	2048	Yes
Iris Pro Graphics 5200	2013	Mobile	Core i7-4750HQ; Core i7-4850HQ	Haswell	0D22; 0D26; 0D2A; 0D2B; 0D2E	200–1200	320:40:4 + eDRAM (GT3e)	12; FL11_1	4.3^{Windows} 4.1^{macOS} 4.6^{Linux} ES 3.2^{Linux}	1.2	1.0^{Linux}	25.6	2048	Yes
Iris Pro Graphics 5200	2013	Mobile	Core i7-49xxHQ	Haswell	0D22; 0D26; 0D2A; 0D2B; 0D2E	200–1300	320:40:4 + eDRAM (GT3e)	12; FL11_1	4.3^{Windows} 4.1^{macOS} 4.6^{Linux} ES 3.2^{Linux}	1.2	1.0^{Linux}	25.6	2048	Yes

== Gen8 ==
- ^{1} FP32 ALUs : EUs : Subslices
- Each EU contains 2 x 128-bit FPUs. One supports 32-bit and 64-bit integer, FP16, FP32, FP64, and transcendental math functions, and the other supports only 32-bit and 64-bit integer, FP16 and FP32. Thus the FP16 (or 16-bit integer) FLOPS is twice the FP32 (or 32-bit integer) FLOPS. Since the throughput of FP64 instructions is one per 2 cycles, the FP64 FLOPS is a quarter of the FP32 FLOPS.
- Each Subslice contains 8 EUs and a sampler (4 tex/clk), and has 64 KB shared memory.
- Intel Quick Sync Video
- For Windows 10, the total system memory that is available for graphics use is half the system memory. For Windows 8, it is up to 3840 MB. On Windows 7, it is up to about 1.7 GB through DVMT.

Specifications of Intel HD Graphics series
Graphics	Launch	Market	Processor	Code name	Device ID	Clock rate (MHz)	Core config^{1}	API support				eDRAM (MB)	Memory bandwidth (GB/s)
Graphics	Launch	Market	Processor	Code name	Device ID	Clock rate (MHz)	Core config^{1}	Direct3D	OpenGL	OpenCL	Vulkan	eDRAM (MB)	Memory bandwidth (GB/s)
HD Graphics	2015	Ultramobile	Atom x5-Z8300	Cherryview; Braswell (Gen8LP)	22B0; 22B1; 22B2; 22B3	200-500	96:12:2	11.2	4.4^{Windows} 4.6^{Linux} ES 3.2^{Linux}	2.0^{Windows} 1.2^{Linux}	1.1^{Linux}	-	12.8
HD Graphics	2015	Ultramobile	Atom x5-Z8500	Cherryview; Braswell (Gen8LP)	22B0; 22B1; 22B2; 22B3	200-600	96:12:2	11.2	4.4^{Windows} 4.6^{Linux} ES 3.2^{Linux}	2.0^{Windows} 1.2^{Linux}	1.1^{Linux}	-	25.6
HD Graphics	2015	Ultramobile	Atom x5-E8000; Celeron N3000; Celeron N3050	Cherryview; Braswell (Gen8LP)	22B0; 22B1; 22B2; 22B3	320-600	96:12:2	11.2	4.4^{Windows} 4.6^{Linux} ES 3.2^{Linux}	2.0^{Windows} 1.2^{Linux}	1.1^{Linux}	-	25.6
HD Graphics	2015	Ultramobile	Celeron N3150	Cherryview; Braswell (Gen8LP)	22B0; 22B1; 22B2; 22B3	320-640	96:12:2	11.2	4.4^{Windows} 4.6^{Linux} ES 3.2^{Linux}	2.0^{Windows} 1.2^{Linux}	1.1^{Linux}	-	25.6
HD Graphics	2015	Ultramobile	Atom x7-Z8700	Cherryview; Braswell (Gen8LP)	22B0; 22B1; 22B2; 22B3	200-600	128:16:2	11.2	4.4^{Windows} 4.6^{Linux} ES 3.2^{Linux}	2.0^{Windows} 1.2^{Linux}	1.1^{Linux}	-	25.6
HD Graphics	2015	Ultramobile	Pentium N3700	Cherryview; Braswell (Gen8LP)	22B0; 22B1; 22B2; 22B3	400-700	128:16:2	11.2	4.4^{Windows} 4.6^{Linux} ES 3.2^{Linux}	2.0^{Windows} 1.2^{Linux}	1.1^{Linux}	-	25.6
HD Graphics 400	2016	Ultramobile	Atom x5-Z8350	Cherryview; Braswell (Gen8LP)	22B0; 22B1; 22B2; 22B3	200-500	96:12:2	11.2	4.4^{Windows} 4.6^{Linux} ES 3.2^{Linux}	2.0^{Windows} 1.2^{Linux}	1.1^{Linux}	-	25.6
HD Graphics 400	2016	Ultramobile	Celeron N3010; Celeron N3060	Cherryview; Braswell (Gen8LP)	22B0; 22B1; 22B2; 22B3	320-600	96:12:2	11.2	4.4^{Windows} 4.6^{Linux} ES 3.2^{Linux}	2.0^{Windows} 1.2^{Linux}	1.1^{Linux}	-	25.6
HD Graphics 400	2016	Ultramobile	Celeron N3160	Cherryview; Braswell (Gen8LP)	22B0; 22B1; 22B2; 22B3	320-640	96:12:2	11.2	4.4^{Windows} 4.6^{Linux} ES 3.2^{Linux}	2.0^{Windows} 1.2^{Linux}	1.1^{Linux}	-	25.6
HD Graphics 400	2016	Ultramobile	Celeron J3060; Celeron J3160	Cherryview; Braswell (Gen8LP)	22B0; 22B1; 22B2; 22B3	320-700	96:12:2	11.2	4.4^{Windows} 4.6^{Linux} ES 3.2^{Linux}	2.0^{Windows} 1.2^{Linux}	1.1^{Linux}	-	25.6
HD Graphics 405	2016	Ultramobile	Pentium N3710	Cherryview; Braswell (Gen8LP)	22B0; 22B1; 22B2; 22B3	400-700	128:16:2	11.2	4.4^{Windows} 4.6^{Linux} ES 3.2^{Linux}	2.0^{Windows} 1.2^{Linux}	1.1^{Linux}	-	25.6
HD Graphics 405	2016	Ultramobile	Pentium J3710	Cherryview; Braswell (Gen8LP)	22B0; 22B1; 22B2; 22B3	400-740	144:18:2	11.2	4.4^{Windows} 4.6^{Linux} ES 3.2^{Linux}	2.0^{Windows} 1.2^{Linux}	1.1^{Linux}	-	25.6
HD Graphics	2015	Mobile	Celeron 3205U; Celeron 3755U; Pentium 3805U	Broadwell (Gen8)	1606	100–800	96:12:2 (GT1)	12; FL11_1	4.4^{Windows} 4.1^{macOS} 4.6^{Linux} ES 3.2^{Linux}	2.0^{Windows} 1.2^{macOS} 2.1^{Linux}	1.3^{Linux}	-	25.6
HD Graphics	2015	Mobile	Celeron 3215U; Celeron 3765U; Pentium 3825U	Broadwell (Gen8)	1606	300–850	96:12:2 (GT1)	12; FL11_1	4.4^{Windows} 4.1^{macOS} 4.6^{Linux} ES 3.2^{Linux}	2.0^{Windows} 1.2^{macOS} 2.1^{Linux}	1.3^{Linux}	-	25.6
HD Graphics 5300	2014	Ultramobile	Core M-5Y10; Core M-5Y10a	Broadwell (Gen8)	161E	100–800	192:24:3 (GT2)	12; FL11_1	4.4^{Windows} 4.1^{macOS} 4.6^{Linux} ES 3.2^{Linux}	2.0^{Windows} 1.2^{macOS} 2.1^{Linux}	1.3^{Linux}	-	25.6
HD Graphics 5300	2014	Ultramobile	Core M-5Y10c	Broadwell (Gen8)	161E	300–800	192:24:3 (GT2)	12; FL11_1	4.4^{Windows} 4.1^{macOS} 4.6^{Linux} ES 3.2^{Linux}	2.0^{Windows} 1.2^{macOS} 2.1^{Linux}	1.3^{Linux}	-	25.6
HD Graphics 5300	2014	Ultramobile	Core M-5Y70	Broadwell (Gen8)	161E	100–850	192:24:3 (GT2)	12; FL11_1	4.4^{Windows} 4.1^{macOS} 4.6^{Linux} ES 3.2^{Linux}	2.0^{Windows} 1.2^{macOS} 2.1^{Linux}	1.3^{Linux}	-	25.6
HD Graphics 5300	2014	Ultramobile	Core M-5Y31	Broadwell (Gen8)	161E	300–850	192:24:3 (GT2)	12; FL11_1	4.4^{Windows} 4.1^{macOS} 4.6^{Linux} ES 3.2^{Linux}	2.0^{Windows} 1.2^{macOS} 2.1^{Linux}	1.3^{Linux}	-	25.6
HD Graphics 5300	2014	Ultramobile	Core M-5Y51; Core M-5Y71	Broadwell (Gen8)	161E	300–900	192:24:3 (GT2)	12; FL11_1	4.4^{Windows} 4.1^{macOS} 4.6^{Linux} ES 3.2^{Linux}	2.0^{Windows} 1.2^{macOS} 2.1^{Linux}	1.3^{Linux}	-	25.6
HD Graphics 5500	2015	Mobile	Core i3-5005U; Core i3-5015U	Broadwell (Gen8)	1616	300–850	184:23:3 (GT2)	12; FL11_1	4.4^{Windows} 4.1^{macOS} 4.6^{Linux} ES 3.2^{Linux}	2.0^{Windows} 1.2^{macOS} 2.1^{Linux}	1.3^{Linux}	-	25.6
HD Graphics 5500	2015	Mobile	Core i3-5010U; Core i3-5020U	Broadwell (Gen8)	1616	300–900	184:23:3 (GT2)	12; FL11_1	4.4^{Windows} 4.1^{macOS} 4.6^{Linux} ES 3.2^{Linux}	2.0^{Windows} 1.2^{macOS} 2.1^{Linux}	1.3^{Linux}	-	25.6
HD Graphics 5500	2015	Mobile	Core i5-5200U; Core i5-5300U	Broadwell (Gen8)	1616	300–900	192:24:3 (GT2)	12; FL11_1	4.4^{Windows} 4.1^{macOS} 4.6^{Linux} ES 3.2^{Linux}	2.0^{Windows} 1.2^{macOS} 2.1^{Linux}	1.3^{Linux}	-	25.6
HD Graphics 5500	2015	Mobile	Core i7-5500U; Core i7-5600U	Broadwell (Gen8)	1616	300–950	192:24:3 (GT2)	12; FL11_1	4.4^{Windows} 4.1^{macOS} 4.6^{Linux} ES 3.2^{Linux}	2.0^{Windows} 1.2^{macOS} 2.1^{Linux}	1.3^{Linux}	-	25.6
HD Graphics 5600	2015	Mobile	Core i7-5700EQ	Broadwell (Gen8)	1612	300–1000	192:24:3 (GT2)	12; FL11_1	4.4^{Windows} 4.1^{macOS} 4.6^{Linux} ES 3.2^{Linux}	2.0^{Windows} 1.2^{macOS} 2.1^{Linux}	1.3^{Linux}	-	25.6
HD Graphics 5600	2015	Mobile	Core i7-5700HQ	Broadwell (Gen8)	1612	300–1050	192:24:3 (GT2)	12; FL11_1	4.4^{Windows} 4.1^{macOS} 4.6^{Linux} ES 3.2^{Linux}	2.0^{Windows} 1.2^{macOS} 2.1^{Linux}	1.3^{Linux}	-	25.6
HD Graphics P5700	2015	Mobile	Xeon E3-1258L v4	Broadwell (Gen8)	?	700-1000	192:24:3 (GT2)	12; FL11_1	4.4^{Windows} 4.1^{macOS} 4.6^{Linux} ES 3.2^{Linux}	2.0^{Windows} 1.2^{macOS} 2.1^{Linux}	1.3^{Linux}	-	25.6
HD Graphics 6000	2015	Mobile	Core i5-5250U	Broadwell (Gen8)	1626	300–950	384:48:6 (GT3)	12; FL11_1	4.4^{Windows} 4.1^{macOS} 4.6^{Linux} ES 3.2^{Linux}	2.0^{Windows} 1.2^{macOS} 2.1^{Linux}	1.3^{Linux}	-	25.6
HD Graphics 6000	2015	Mobile	Core i5-5350U; Core i7-5550U; Core i7-5650U	Broadwell (Gen8)	1626	300–1000	384:48:6 (GT3)	12; FL11_1	4.4^{Windows} 4.1^{macOS} 4.6^{Linux} ES 3.2^{Linux}	2.0^{Windows} 1.2^{macOS} 2.1^{Linux}	1.3^{Linux}	-	25.6
Iris Graphics 6100	2015	Mobile	Core i3-5157U	Broadwell (Gen8)	162B	300–1000	384:48:6 (GT3)	12; FL11_1	4.4^{Windows} 4.1^{macOS} 4.6^{Linux} ES 3.2^{Linux}	2.0^{Windows} 1.2^{macOS} 2.1^{Linux}	1.3^{Linux}	-	25.6
Iris Graphics 6100	2015	Mobile	Core i5-5257U	Broadwell (Gen8)	162B	300–1050	384:48:6 (GT3)	12; FL11_1	4.4^{Windows} 4.1^{macOS} 4.6^{Linux} ES 3.2^{Linux}	2.0^{Windows} 1.2^{macOS} 2.1^{Linux}	1.3^{Linux}	-	25.6
Iris Graphics 6100	2015	Mobile	Core i5-5287U; Core i7-5557U	Broadwell (Gen8)	162B	300–1100	384:48:6 (GT3)	12; FL11_1	4.4^{Windows} 4.1^{macOS} 4.6^{Linux} ES 3.2^{Linux}	2.0^{Windows} 1.2^{macOS} 2.1^{Linux}	1.3^{Linux}	-	25.6
Iris Pro Graphics 6200	2015	Desktop	Core i5-5575R	Broadwell (Gen8)	1622	300–1050	384:48:6 (GT3)	12; FL11_1	4.4^{Windows} 4.1^{macOS} 4.6^{Linux} ES 3.2^{Linux}	2.0^{Windows} 1.2^{macOS} 2.1^{Linux}	1.3^{Linux}	128	25.6
Iris Pro Graphics 6200	2015	Desktop	Core i5-5675C; Core i5-5675R	Broadwell (Gen8)	1622	300–1100	384:48:6 (GT3)	12; FL11_1	4.4^{Windows} 4.1^{macOS} 4.6^{Linux} ES 3.2^{Linux}	2.0^{Windows} 1.2^{macOS} 2.1^{Linux}	1.3^{Linux}	128	25.6
Iris Pro Graphics 6200	2015	Desktop	Core i7-5775C; Core i7-5775R	Broadwell (Gen8)	1622	300–1150	384:48:6 (GT3)	12; FL11_1	4.4^{Windows} 4.1^{macOS} 4.6^{Linux} ES 3.2^{Linux}	2.0^{Windows} 1.2^{macOS} 2.1^{Linux}	1.3^{Linux}	128	25.6
Iris Pro Graphics 6200	2015	Mobile	Core i7-5850EQ	Broadwell (Gen8)	1622	300–1000	384:48:6 (GT3)	12; FL11_1	4.4^{Windows} 4.1^{macOS} 4.6^{Linux} ES 3.2^{Linux}	2.0^{Windows} 1.2^{macOS} 2.1^{Linux}	1.3^{Linux}	128	25.6
Iris Pro Graphics 6200	2015	Mobile	Core i5-5350H	Broadwell (Gen8)	1622	300–1050	384:48:6 (GT3)	12; FL11_1	4.4^{Windows} 4.1^{macOS} 4.6^{Linux} ES 3.2^{Linux}	2.0^{Windows} 1.2^{macOS} 2.1^{Linux}	1.3^{Linux}	128	25.6
Iris Pro Graphics 6200	2015	Mobile	Core i7-5750HQ; Core i7-5850HQ	Broadwell (Gen8)	1622	300–1100	384:48:6 (GT3)	12; FL11_1	4.4^{Windows} 4.1^{macOS} 4.6^{Linux} ES 3.2^{Linux}	2.0^{Windows} 1.2^{macOS} 2.1^{Linux}	1.3^{Linux}	128	25.6
Iris Pro Graphics 6200	2015	Mobile	Core i7-5950HQ	Broadwell (Gen8)	1622	300–1150	384:48:6 (GT3)	12; FL11_1	4.4^{Windows} 4.1^{macOS} 4.6^{Linux} ES 3.2^{Linux}	2.0^{Windows} 1.2^{macOS} 2.1^{Linux}	1.3^{Linux}	128	25.6
Iris Pro Graphics P6300	2015	Workstation	Xeon E3-1278L v4	Broadwell (Gen8)	162A	800–1000	384:48:6 (GT3)	12; FL11_1	4.4^{Windows} 4.1^{macOS} 4.6^{Linux} ES 3.2^{Linux}	2.0^{Windows} 1.2^{macOS} 2.1^{Linux}	1.3^{Linux}	128	25.6
Iris Pro Graphics P6300	2015	Workstation	Xeon E3-1265L v4	Broadwell (Gen8)	162A	300–1050	384:48:6 (GT3)	12; FL11_1	4.4^{Windows} 4.1^{macOS} 4.6^{Linux} ES 3.2^{Linux}	2.0^{Windows} 1.2^{macOS} 2.1^{Linux}	1.3^{Linux}	128	25.6
Iris Pro Graphics P6300	2015	Workstation	Xeon E3-1285 v4 Xeon E3-1285L v4	Broadwell (Gen8)	162A	300–1150	384:48:6 (GT3)	12; FL11_1	4.4^{Windows} 4.1^{macOS} 4.6^{Linux} ES 3.2^{Linux}	2.0^{Windows} 1.2^{macOS} 2.1^{Linux}	1.3^{Linux}	128	25.6

== Gen9 ==
- ^{1} FP32 ALUs : EUs : Subslices
- Each EU contains 2 x 128-bit FPUs. One supports 32-bit and 64-bit integer, FP16, FP32, FP64, and transcendental math functions, and the other supports only 32-bit and 64-bit integer, FP16 and FP32. Thus the FP16 (or 16-bit integer) FLOPS is twice the FP32 (or 32-bit integer) FLOPS. Since the throughput of FP64 instructions are 2 cycles, the FP64 FLOPS is a quarter (eighth in Apollo Lake) of the FP32 FLOPS.
- Each Subslice contains 8 EUs (two of which are disabled in GT1) and a sampler (4 tex/clk), and has 64 KB shared memory.
- Intel Quick Sync Video
- For Windows 10, the total system memory that is available for graphics use is half the system memory. For Windows 8, it is up to 3840 MB. On Windows 7, it is up to about 1.7 GB through DVMT.
- WDDM 2.2 support with Windows Mixed Reality begins with KabyLake-based GPUs.

Specifications of Gen9 Intel graphics processing units
Name	Release year	Market	Processor	Code name	Device ID	Clock rate		Core config^{1}	API support				eDRAM (MB)	Memory bandwidth (GB/s)
Name	Release year	Market	Processor	Code name	Device ID	Min (MHz)	Max (MHz)	Core config^{1}	Direct3D	OpenGL	OpenCL	Vulkan	eDRAM (MB)	Memory bandwidth (GB/s)
HD Graphics 500	2016	Mobile/ Embedded	Atom x5-E3930	Apollo Lake (Gen9LP)	5A85	400	550	96:12:2	12	4.6^{Windows} 4.6^{Linux} ES 3.2^{Linux}	3.0^{Windows} 3.0^{Linux}	1.3^{Windows} 1.3^{Linux}	-	68.2
HD Graphics 500	2016	Mobile/ Embedded	Atom x5-E3940	Apollo Lake (Gen9LP)	5A85	400	600	96:12:2	12	4.6^{Windows} 4.6^{Linux} ES 3.2^{Linux}	3.0^{Windows} 3.0^{Linux}	1.3^{Windows} 1.3^{Linux}	-	68.2
HD Graphics 500	2016	Mobile	Celeron N3350	Apollo Lake (Gen9LP)	5A85	200	650	96:12:2	12	4.6^{Windows} 4.6^{Linux} ES 3.2^{Linux}	3.0^{Windows} 3.0^{Linux}	1.3^{Windows} 1.3^{Linux}	-	38.4
HD Graphics 500	2016	Mobile	Celeron N3450	Apollo Lake (Gen9LP)	5A85	200	700	96:12:2	12	4.6^{Windows} 4.6^{Linux} ES 3.2^{Linux}	3.0^{Windows} 3.0^{Linux}	1.3^{Windows} 1.3^{Linux}	-	38.4
HD Graphics 500	2016	Desktop	Celeron J3355	Apollo Lake (Gen9LP)	5A85	250	700	96:12:2	12	4.6^{Windows} 4.6^{Linux} ES 3.2^{Linux}	3.0^{Windows} 3.0^{Linux}	1.3^{Windows} 1.3^{Linux}	-	38.4
HD Graphics 500	2016	Desktop	Celeron J3455	Apollo Lake (Gen9LP)	5A85	250	750	96:12:2	12	4.6^{Windows} 4.6^{Linux} ES 3.2^{Linux}	3.0^{Windows} 3.0^{Linux}	1.3^{Windows} 1.3^{Linux}	-	38.4
HD Graphics 505	2016	Mobile/ Embedded	Atom x7-E3950	Apollo Lake (Gen9LP)	5A84	500	650	144:18:3	12	4.6^{Windows} 4.6^{Linux} ES 3.2^{Linux}	3.0^{Windows} 3.0^{Linux}	1.3^{Windows} 1.3^{Linux}	-	76.8
HD Graphics 505	2016	Mobile	Pentium N4200	Apollo Lake (Gen9LP)	5A84	200	750	144:18:3	12	4.6^{Windows} 4.6^{Linux} ES 3.2^{Linux}	3.0^{Windows} 3.0^{Linux}	1.3^{Windows} 1.3^{Linux}	-	38.4
HD Graphics 505	2016	Desktop	Pentium J4205	Apollo Lake (Gen9LP)	5A84	250	800	144:18:3	12	4.6^{Windows} 4.6^{Linux} ES 3.2^{Linux}	3.0^{Windows} 3.0^{Linux}	1.3^{Windows} 1.3^{Linux}	-	38.4
HD Graphics 510	2015	Mobile	Celeron 3855U; Celeron 3955U	Skylake (Gen9)	1906	300	900	96:12:2 (GT1)	12; FL12_1	4.6^{Windows} 4.1^{macOS} 4.6^{Linux} ES 3.2^{Linux}	3.0^{Windows} 1.2^{macOS} 3.0^{Linux}	1.3^{Windows} 1.4^{Linux}	-	34.1
HD Graphics 510	2015	Mobile	Pentium 4405U	Skylake (Gen9)	1906	300	950	96:12:2 (GT1)	12; FL12_1	4.6^{Windows} 4.1^{macOS} 4.6^{Linux} ES 3.2^{Linux}	3.0^{Windows} 1.2^{macOS} 3.0^{Linux}	1.3^{Windows} 1.4^{Linux}	-	34.1
HD Graphics 510	2015	Desktop	Celeron G3900TE; Celeron G3900E; Celeron G3900T; Celeron G3900; Celeron G3902E; Celeron G3920; Pentium G4400TE; Pentium G4400T; Core i5-6402P	Skylake (Gen9)	1902	350	950	96:12:2 (GT1)	12; FL12_1	4.6^{Windows} 4.1^{macOS} 4.6^{Linux} ES 3.2^{Linux}	3.0^{Windows} 1.2^{macOS} 3.0^{Linux}	1.3^{Windows} 1.4^{Linux}	-	34.1
HD Graphics 510	2015	Desktop	Pentium G4400	Skylake (Gen9)	1902	350	1000	96:12:2 (GT1)	12; FL12_1	4.6^{Windows} 4.1^{macOS} 4.6^{Linux} ES 3.2^{Linux}	3.0^{Windows} 1.2^{macOS} 3.0^{Linux}	1.3^{Windows} 1.4^{Linux}	-	34.1
HD Graphics 510	2015	Desktop	Core i3-6098P	Skylake (Gen9)	1902	350	1050	96:12:2 (GT1)	12; FL12_1	4.6^{Windows} 4.1^{macOS} 4.6^{Linux} ES 3.2^{Linux}	3.0^{Windows} 1.2^{macOS} 3.0^{Linux}	1.3^{Windows} 1.4^{Linux}	-	34.1
HD Graphics 515	2015	Mobile	Pentium 4405Y	Skylake (Gen9)	191E	300	800	192:24:3 (GT2)	12; FL12_1	4.6^{Windows} 4.1^{macOS} 4.6^{Linux} ES 3.2^{Linux}	3.0^{Windows} 1.2^{macOS} 3.0^{Linux}	1.3^{Windows} 1.4^{Linux}	-	29.8
HD Graphics 515	2015	Mobile	Core m3-6Y30	Skylake (Gen9)	191E	300	850	192:24:3 (GT2)	12; FL12_1	4.6^{Windows} 4.1^{macOS} 4.6^{Linux} ES 3.2^{Linux}	3.0^{Windows} 1.2^{macOS} 3.0^{Linux}	1.3^{Windows} 1.4^{Linux}	-	29.8
HD Graphics 515	2015	Mobile	Core m5-6Y54; Core m5-6Y57	Skylake (Gen9)	191E	300	900	192:24:3 (GT2)	12; FL12_1	4.6^{Windows} 4.1^{macOS} 4.6^{Linux} ES 3.2^{Linux}	3.0^{Windows} 1.2^{macOS} 3.0^{Linux}	1.3^{Windows} 1.4^{Linux}	-	29.8
HD Graphics 515	2015	Mobile	Core m7-6Y75	Skylake (Gen9)	191E	300	1000	192:24:3 (GT2)	12; FL12_1	4.6^{Windows} 4.1^{macOS} 4.6^{Linux} ES 3.2^{Linux}	3.0^{Windows} 1.2^{macOS} 3.0^{Linux}	1.3^{Windows} 1.4^{Linux}	-	29.8
HD Graphics 520	2015	Mobile	Core i3-6006U	Skylake (Gen9)	1916	300	900	192:24:3 (GT2)	12; FL12_1	4.6^{Windows} 4.1^{macOS} 4.6^{Linux} ES 3.2^{Linux}	3.0^{Windows} 1.2^{macOS} 3.0^{Linux}	1.3^{Windows} 1.4^{Linux}	-	34.1
HD Graphics 520	2015	Mobile	Core i3-6100U; Core i5-6200U; Core i5-6300U	Skylake (Gen9)	1916	300	1000	192:24:3 (GT2)	12; FL12_1	4.6^{Windows} 4.1^{macOS} 4.6^{Linux} ES 3.2^{Linux}	3.0^{Windows} 1.2^{macOS} 3.0^{Linux}	1.3^{Windows} 1.4^{Linux}	-	34.1
HD Graphics 520	2015	Mobile	Core i7-6500U; Core i7-6600U	Skylake (Gen9)	1916	300	1050	192:24:3 (GT2)	12; FL12_1	4.6^{Windows} 4.1^{macOS} 4.6^{Linux} ES 3.2^{Linux}	3.0^{Windows} 1.2^{macOS} 3.0^{Linux}	1.3^{Windows} 1.4^{Linux}	-	34.1
HD Graphics 530	2015	Mobile	Core i3-6100H	Skylake (Gen9)	191B	350	900	192:24:3 (GT2)	12; FL12_1	4.6^{Windows} 4.1^{macOS} 4.6^{Linux} ES 3.2^{Linux}	3.0^{Windows} 1.2^{macOS} 3.0^{Linux}	1.3^{Windows} 1.4^{Linux}	-	34.1
HD Graphics 530	2015	Mobile	Core i3-6100E; Core i3-6102E; Core i5-6300HQ; Core i5-6440HQ	Skylake (Gen9)	191B	350	950	192:24:3 (GT2)	12; FL12_1	4.6^{Windows} 4.1^{macOS} 4.6^{Linux} ES 3.2^{Linux}	3.0^{Windows} 1.2^{macOS} 3.0^{Linux}	1.3^{Windows} 1.4^{Linux}	-	34.1
HD Graphics 530	2015	Mobile	Core i5-6440EQ; Core i5-6442EQ; Core i7-6820EQ; Core i7-6822EQ	Skylake (Gen9)	191B	350	1000	192:24:3 (GT2)	12; FL12_1	4.6^{Windows} 4.1^{macOS} 4.6^{Linux} ES 3.2^{Linux}	3.0^{Windows} 1.2^{macOS} 3.0^{Linux}	1.3^{Windows} 1.4^{Linux}	-	34.1
HD Graphics 530	2015	Mobile	Core i7-6700HQ; Core i7-6820HK; Core i7-6820HQ; Core i7-6920HQ	Skylake (Gen9)	191B	350	1050	192:24:3 (GT2)	12; FL12_1	4.6^{Windows} 4.1^{macOS} 4.6^{Linux} ES 3.2^{Linux}	3.0^{Windows} 1.2^{macOS} 3.0^{Linux}	1.3^{Windows} 1.4^{Linux}	-	34.1
HD Graphics 530	2015	Desktop	Pentium G4500T; Core i3-6100T; Core i3-6300T; Core i5-6400T; Core i5-6400	Skylake (Gen9)	1912	350	950	192:24:3 (GT2)	12; FL12_1	4.6^{Windows} 4.1^{macOS} 4.6^{Linux} ES 3.2^{Linux}	3.0^{Windows} 1.2^{macOS} 3.0^{Linux}	1.3^{Windows} 1.4^{Linux}	-	34.1
HD Graphics 530	2015	Desktop	Core i3-6100TE; Core i5-6500TE; Core i7-6700TE; Core i7-6700T	Skylake (Gen9)	1912	350	1000	192:24:3 (GT2)	12; FL12_1	4.6^{Windows} 4.1^{macOS} 4.6^{Linux} ES 3.2^{Linux}	3.0^{Windows} 1.2^{macOS} 3.0^{Linux}	1.3^{Windows} 1.4^{Linux}	-	34.1
HD Graphics 530	2015	Desktop	Pentium G4500; Pentium G4520; Core i3-6100 Core i5-6500	Skylake (Gen9)	1912	350	1050	192:24:3 (GT2)	12; FL12_1	4.6^{Windows} 4.1^{macOS} 4.6^{Linux} ES 3.2^{Linux}	3.0^{Windows} 1.2^{macOS} 3.0^{Linux}	1.3^{Windows} 1.4^{Linux}	-	34.1
HD Graphics 530	2015	Desktop	Core i5-6500T; Core i5-6600T; Core i7-6700	Skylake (Gen9)	1912	350	1100	192:24:3 (GT2)	12; FL12_1	4.6^{Windows} 4.1^{macOS} 4.6^{Linux} ES 3.2^{Linux}	3.0^{Windows} 1.2^{macOS} 3.0^{Linux}	1.3^{Windows} 1.4^{Linux}	-	34.1
HD Graphics 530	2015	Desktop	Core i3-6300 Core i3-6320 Core i5-6600 Core i5-6600K; Core i7-6700K	Skylake (Gen9)	1912	350	1150	192:24:3 (GT2)	12; FL12_1	4.6^{Windows} 4.1^{macOS} 4.6^{Linux} ES 3.2^{Linux}	3.0^{Windows} 1.2^{macOS} 3.0^{Linux}	1.3^{Windows} 1.4^{Linux}	-	34.1
HD Graphics P530	2015	Workstation	Xeon E3-1268L v5	Skylake (Gen9)	191D	350	1000	192:24:3 (GT2)	12; FL12_1	4.6^{Windows} 4.1^{macOS} 4.6^{Linux} ES 3.2^{Linux}	3.0^{Windows} 1.2^{macOS} 3.0^{Linux}	1.3^{Windows} 1.4^{Linux}	-	34.1
HD Graphics P530	2015	Mobile; Workstation	Xeon E3-1505L v5	Skylake (Gen9)	191D	350	1000	192:24:3 (GT2)	12; FL12_1	4.6^{Windows} 4.1^{macOS} 4.6^{Linux} ES 3.2^{Linux}	3.0^{Windows} 1.2^{macOS} 3.0^{Linux}	1.3^{Windows} 1.4^{Linux}	-	34.1
HD Graphics P530	2015	Mobile; Workstation	Xeon E3-1505M v5 Xeon E3-1535M v5	Skylake (Gen9)	191D	350	1050	192:24:3 (GT2)	12; FL12_1	4.6^{Windows} 4.1^{macOS} 4.6^{Linux} ES 3.2^{Linux}	3.0^{Windows} 1.2^{macOS} 3.0^{Linux}	1.3^{Windows} 1.4^{Linux}	-	34.1
HD Graphics P530	2015	Workstation	Xeon E3-1225 v5	Skylake (Gen9)	191D	400	1150	192:24:3 (GT2)	12; FL12_1	4.6^{Windows} 4.1^{macOS} 4.6^{Linux} ES 3.2^{Linux}	3.0^{Windows} 1.2^{macOS} 3.0^{Linux}	1.3^{Windows} 1.4^{Linux}	-	34.1
HD Graphics P530	2015	Workstation	Xeon E3-1235L v5	Skylake (Gen9)	191D	400	?	192:24:3 (GT2)	12; FL12_1	4.6^{Windows} 4.1^{macOS} 4.6^{Linux} ES 3.2^{Linux}	3.0^{Windows} 1.2^{macOS} 3.0^{Linux}	1.3^{Windows} 1.4^{Linux}	-	34.1
HD Graphics P530	2015	Workstation	Xeon E3-1245 v5 Xeon E3-1275 v5	Skylake (Gen9)	191D	400	1150	192:24:3 (GT2)	12; FL12_1	4.6^{Windows} 4.1^{macOS} 4.6^{Linux} ES 3.2^{Linux}	3.0^{Windows} 1.2^{macOS} 3.0^{Linux}	1.3^{Windows} 1.4^{Linux}	-	34.1
Iris Graphics 540	2015	Mobile	Core i5-6260U	Skylake (Gen9)	1926	300	950	384:48:6 (GT3)	12; FL12_1	4.6^{Windows} 4.1^{macOS} 4.6^{Linux} ES 3.2^{Linux}	3.0^{Windows} 1.2^{macOS} 3.0^{Linux}	1.3^{Windows} 1.4^{Linux}	64	34.1
Iris Graphics 540	2015	Mobile	Core i5-6360U	Skylake (Gen9)	1926	300	1000	384:48:6 (GT3)	12; FL12_1	4.6^{Windows} 4.1^{macOS} 4.6^{Linux} ES 3.2^{Linux}	3.0^{Windows} 1.2^{macOS} 3.0^{Linux}	1.3^{Windows} 1.4^{Linux}	64	34.1
Iris Graphics 540	2015	Mobile	Core i7-6560U; Core i7-6650U; Core i7-6660U	Skylake (Gen9)	1926	300	1050	384:48:6 (GT3)	12; FL12_1	4.6^{Windows} 4.1^{macOS} 4.6^{Linux} ES 3.2^{Linux}	3.0^{Windows} 1.2^{macOS} 3.0^{Linux}	1.3^{Windows} 1.4^{Linux}	64	34.1
Iris Graphics 550	2015	Mobile	Core i3-6157U; Core i3-6167U	Skylake (Gen9)	1927	300	1000	384:48:6 (GT3)	12; FL12_1	4.6^{Windows} 4.1^{macOS} 4.6^{Linux} ES 3.2^{Linux}	3.0^{Windows} 1.2^{macOS} 3.0^{Linux}	1.3^{Windows} 1.4^{Linux}	64	34.1
Iris Graphics 550	2015	Mobile	Core i5-6267U	Skylake (Gen9)	1927	300	1050	384:48:6 (GT3)	12; FL12_1	4.6^{Windows} 4.1^{macOS} 4.6^{Linux} ES 3.2^{Linux}	3.0^{Windows} 1.2^{macOS} 3.0^{Linux}	1.3^{Windows} 1.4^{Linux}	64	34.1
Iris Graphics 550	2015	Mobile	Core i5-6287U; Core i7-6567U	Skylake (Gen9)	1927	300	1100	384:48:6 (GT3)	12; FL12_1	4.6^{Windows} 4.1^{macOS} 4.6^{Linux} ES 3.2^{Linux}	3.0^{Windows} 1.2^{macOS} 3.0^{Linux}	1.3^{Windows} 1.4^{Linux}	64	34.1
Iris Pro Graphics P555	2016	Workstation	Xeon E3-1558L v5	Skylake (Gen9)	192D	650	1000	384:48:6 (GT3)	12; FL12_1	4.6^{Windows} 4.1^{macOS} 4.6^{Linux} ES 3.2^{Linux}	3.0^{Windows} 1.2^{macOS} 3.0^{Linux}	1.3^{Windows} 1.4^{Linux}	128	34.1
Iris Pro Graphics 580	2016	Mobile	Core i5-6350HQ	Skylake (Gen9)	193B	350	900	576:72:9 (GT4)	12; FL12_1	4.6^{Windows} 4.1^{macOS} 4.6^{Linux} ES 3.2^{Linux}	3.0^{Windows} 1.2^{macOS} 3.0^{Linux}	1.3^{Windows} 1.4^{Linux}	128	34.1
Iris Pro Graphics 580	2016	Mobile	Core i7-6770HQ	Skylake (Gen9)	193B	350	950	576:72:9 (GT4)	12; FL12_1	4.6^{Windows} 4.1^{macOS} 4.6^{Linux} ES 3.2^{Linux}	3.0^{Windows} 1.2^{macOS} 3.0^{Linux}	1.3^{Windows} 1.4^{Linux}	128	34.1
Iris Pro Graphics 580	2016	Mobile	Core i7-6870HQ	Skylake (Gen9)	193B	350	1000	576:72:9 (GT4)	12; FL12_1	4.6^{Windows} 4.1^{macOS} 4.6^{Linux} ES 3.2^{Linux}	3.0^{Windows} 1.2^{macOS} 3.0^{Linux}	1.3^{Windows} 1.4^{Linux}	128	34.1
Iris Pro Graphics 580	2016	Mobile	Core i7-6970HQ	Skylake (Gen9)	193B	350	1050	576:72:9 (GT4)	12; FL12_1	4.6^{Windows} 4.1^{macOS} 4.6^{Linux} ES 3.2^{Linux}	3.0^{Windows} 1.2^{macOS} 3.0^{Linux}	1.3^{Windows} 1.4^{Linux}	128	34.1
Iris Pro Graphics 580	2016	Desktop	Core i5-6585R	Skylake (Gen9)	193B	350	1100	576:72:9 (GT4)	12; FL12_1	4.6^{Windows} 4.1^{macOS} 4.6^{Linux} ES 3.2^{Linux}	3.0^{Windows} 1.2^{macOS} 3.0^{Linux}	1.3^{Windows} 1.4^{Linux}	128	34.1
Iris Pro Graphics 580	2016	Desktop	Core i5-6685R; Core i7-6785R	Skylake (Gen9)	193B	350	1150	576:72:9 (GT4)	12; FL12_1	4.6^{Windows} 4.1^{macOS} 4.6^{Linux} ES 3.2^{Linux}	3.0^{Windows} 1.2^{macOS} 3.0^{Linux}	1.3^{Windows} 1.4^{Linux}	128	34.1
Iris Pro Graphics P580	2016	Workstation	Xeon E3-1578L v5	Skylake (Gen9)	193D	700	1000	576:72:9 (GT4)	12; FL12_1	4.6^{Windows} 4.1^{macOS} 4.6^{Linux} ES 3.2^{Linux}	3.0^{Windows} 1.2^{macOS} 3.0^{Linux}	1.3^{Windows} 1.4^{Linux}	128	34.1
Iris Pro Graphics P580	2016	Mobile; Workstation	Xeon E3-1515M v5	Skylake (Gen9)	193D	350	1000	576:72:9 (GT4)	12; FL12_1	4.6^{Windows} 4.1^{macOS} 4.6^{Linux} ES 3.2^{Linux}	3.0^{Windows} 1.2^{macOS} 3.0^{Linux}	1.3^{Windows} 1.4^{Linux}	128	34.1
Iris Pro Graphics P580	2016	Mobile; Workstation	Xeon E3-1545M v5	Skylake (Gen9)	193D	350	1050	576:72:9 (GT4)	12; FL12_1	4.6^{Windows} 4.1^{macOS} 4.6^{Linux} ES 3.2^{Linux}	3.0^{Windows} 1.2^{macOS} 3.0^{Linux}	1.3^{Windows} 1.4^{Linux}	128	34.1
Iris Pro Graphics P580	2016	Mobile; Workstation	Xeon E3-1575M v5	Skylake (Gen9)	193D	350	1100	576:72:9 (GT4)	12; FL12_1	4.6^{Windows} 4.1^{macOS} 4.6^{Linux} ES 3.2^{Linux}	3.0^{Windows} 1.2^{macOS} 3.0^{Linux}	1.3^{Windows} 1.4^{Linux}	128	34.1
Iris Pro Graphics P580	2016	Workstation	Xeon E3-1565L v5	Skylake (Gen9)	193A	350	1050	576:72:9 (GT4)	12; FL12_1	4.6^{Windows} 4.1^{macOS} 4.6^{Linux} ES 3.2^{Linux}	3.0^{Windows} 1.2^{macOS} 3.0^{Linux}	1.3^{Windows} 1.4^{Linux}	128	34.1
Iris Pro Graphics P580	2016	Workstation	Xeon E3-1585L v5 Xeon E3-1585 v5	Skylake (Gen9)	193A	350	1150	576:72:9 (GT4)	12; FL12_1	4.6^{Windows} 4.1^{macOS} 4.6^{Linux} ES 3.2^{Linux}	3.0^{Windows} 1.2^{macOS} 3.0^{Linux}	1.3^{Windows} 1.4^{Linux}	128	34.1
UHD Graphics 600	2017	Mobile	Celeron N4000; Celeron N4020	Gemini Lake; Gemini Lake Refresh (Gen9LP)	3185	200	650	96:12:2	12	4.6^{Windows} 4.6^{Linux} ES 3.2^{Linux}	3.0^{Windows} 3.0^{Linux}	1.3^{Windows} 1.3^{Linux}	-	38.4
UHD Graphics 600	2017	Mobile	Celeron N4100; Celeron N4120	Gemini Lake; Gemini Lake Refresh (Gen9LP)	3185	200	700	96:12:2	12	4.6^{Windows} 4.6^{Linux} ES 3.2^{Linux}	3.0^{Windows} 3.0^{Linux}	1.3^{Windows} 1.3^{Linux}	-	38.4
UHD Graphics 600	2017	Desktop	Celeron J4005; Celeron J4025	Gemini Lake; Gemini Lake Refresh (Gen9LP)	3185	250	700	96:12:2	12	4.6^{Windows} 4.6^{Linux} ES 3.2^{Linux}	3.0^{Windows} 3.0^{Linux}	1.3^{Windows} 1.3^{Linux}	-	38.4
UHD Graphics 600	2017	Desktop	Celeron J4105; Celeron J4125	Gemini Lake; Gemini Lake Refresh (Gen9LP)	3185	250	750	96:12:2	12	4.6^{Windows} 4.6^{Linux} ES 3.2^{Linux}	3.0^{Windows} 3.0^{Linux}	1.3^{Windows} 1.3^{Linux}	-	38.4
UHD Graphics 605	2017	Mobile	Pentium Silver N5000; Pentium Silver N5030	Gemini Lake; Gemini Lake Refresh (Gen9LP)	3184	200	750	144:18:3	12	4.6^{Windows} 4.6^{Linux} ES 3.2^{Linux}	3.0^{Windows} 3.0^{Linux}	1.3^{Windows} 1.3^{Linux}	-	38.4
UHD Graphics 605	2017	Desktop	Pentium Silver J5005; Pentium Silver J5040	Gemini Lake; Gemini Lake Refresh (Gen9LP)	3184	250	800	144:18:3	12	4.6^{Windows} 4.6^{Linux} ES 3.2^{Linux}	3.0^{Windows} 3.0^{Linux}	1.3^{Windows} 1.3^{Linux}	-	38.4
HD Graphics 610	2017	Mobile	Celeron 3865U; Celeron 3965U	Kaby Lake (Gen9p5)	5906	300	900	96:12:2 (GT1)	12; FL12_1	4.6^{Windows} 4.1^{macOS} 4.6^{Linux} ES 3.2^{Linux}	3.0^{Windows} 1.2^{macOS} 3.0^{Linux}	1.3^{Windows} 1.4^{Linux}	-	34.1
HD Graphics 610	2017	Mobile	Pentium 4415U	Kaby Lake (Gen9p5)	5906	300	950	96:12:2 (GT1)	12; FL12_1	4.6^{Windows} 4.1^{macOS} 4.6^{Linux} ES 3.2^{Linux}	3.0^{Windows} 1.2^{macOS} 3.0^{Linux}	1.3^{Windows} 1.4^{Linux}	-	34.1
HD Graphics 610	2017	Desktop	Celeron G3930TE	Kaby Lake (Gen9p5)	5902	350	950	96:12:2 (GT1)	12; FL12_1	4.6^{Windows} 4.1^{macOS} 4.6^{Linux} ES 3.2^{Linux}	3.0^{Windows} 1.2^{macOS} 3.0^{Linux}	1.3^{Windows} 1.4^{Linux}	-	34.1
HD Graphics 610	2017	Desktop	Celeron G3930E; Celeron G3930T	Kaby Lake (Gen9p5)	5902	350	1000	96:12:2 (GT1)	12; FL12_1	4.6^{Windows} 4.1^{macOS} 4.6^{Linux} ES 3.2^{Linux}	3.0^{Windows} 1.2^{macOS} 3.0^{Linux}	1.3^{Windows} 1.4^{Linux}	-	34.1
HD Graphics 610	2017	Desktop	Celeron G3930; Celeron G3950	Kaby Lake (Gen9p5)	5902	350	1050	96:12:2 (GT1)	12; FL12_1	4.6^{Windows} 4.1^{macOS} 4.6^{Linux} ES 3.2^{Linux}	3.0^{Windows} 1.2^{macOS} 3.0^{Linux}	1.3^{Windows} 1.4^{Linux}	-	34.1
HD Graphics 610	2017	Desktop	Pentium G4560T; Pentium G4560	Kaby Lake (Gen9p5)	5902	350	1050	96:12:2 (GT1)	12; FL12_1	4.6^{Windows} 4.1^{macOS} 4.6^{Linux} ES 3.2^{Linux}	3.0^{Windows} 1.2^{macOS} 3.0^{Linux}	1.3^{Windows} 1.4^{Linux}	-	38.4
HD Graphics 610	2017	Desktop	Core i3-7101TE; Core i3-7101E	Kaby Lake (Gen9p5)	5902	350	1100	96:12:2 (GT1)	12; FL12_1	4.6^{Windows} 4.1^{macOS} 4.6^{Linux} ES 3.2^{Linux}	3.0^{Windows} 1.2^{macOS} 3.0^{Linux}	1.3^{Windows} 1.4^{Linux}	-	38.4
HD Graphics 615	2017	Mobile	Celeron 3965Y; Pentium 4410Y; Pentium 4415Y	Kaby Lake (Gen9p5)	591E	300	850	192:24:3 (GT2)	12; FL12_1	4.6^{Windows} 4.1^{macOS} 4.6^{Linux} ES 3.2^{Linux}	3.0^{Windows} 1.2^{macOS} 3.0^{Linux}	1.3^{Windows} 1.4^{Linux}	-	29.8
HD Graphics 615	2017	Mobile	Pentium Gold 6500Y Core m3-7Y30; Core m3-7Y32 Core m3-8100Y	Kaby Lake (Gen9p5)	591E	300	900	192:24:3 (GT2)	12; FL12_1	4.6^{Windows} 4.1^{macOS} 4.6^{Linux} ES 3.2^{Linux}	3.0^{Windows} 1.2^{macOS} 3.0^{Linux}	1.3^{Windows} 1.4^{Linux}	-	29.8
HD Graphics 615	2017	Mobile	Core i5-7Y54; Core i5-7Y57 Core m3-8300Y	Kaby Lake (Gen9p5)	591E	300	950	192:24:3 (GT2)	12; FL12_1	4.6^{Windows} 4.1^{macOS} 4.6^{Linux} ES 3.2^{Linux}	3.0^{Windows} 1.2^{macOS} 3.0^{Linux}	1.3^{Windows} 1.4^{Linux}	-	29.8
HD Graphics 615	2017	Mobile	Core i7-7Y75 Core m3-8500Y	Kaby Lake (Gen9p5)	591E	300	1050	192:24:3 (GT2)	12; FL12_1	4.6^{Windows} 4.1^{macOS} 4.6^{Linux} ES 3.2^{Linux}	3.0^{Windows} 1.2^{macOS} 3.0^{Linux}	1.3^{Windows} 1.4^{Linux}	-	29.8
HD Graphics 620	2017	Mobile	Core i3-7020U; Core i3-7100U; Core i3-7130U; Core i5-7200U	Kaby Lake (Gen9p5)	5916	300	1000	192:24:3 (GT2)	12; FL12_1	4.6^{Windows} 4.1^{macOS} 4.6^{Linux} ES 3.2^{Linux}	3.0^{Windows} 1.2^{macOS} 3.0^{Linux}	1.3^{Windows} 1.4^{Linux}	-	34.1
HD Graphics 620	2017	Mobile	Core i7-7500U	Kaby Lake (Gen9p5)	5916	300	1050	192:24:3 (GT2)	12; FL12_1	4.6^{Windows} 4.1^{macOS} 4.6^{Linux} ES 3.2^{Linux}	3.0^{Windows} 1.2^{macOS} 3.0^{Linux}	1.3^{Windows} 1.4^{Linux}	-	34.1
HD Graphics 620	2017	Mobile	Core i5-7300U	Kaby Lake (Gen9p5)	5916	300	1100	192:24:3 (GT2)	12; FL12_1	4.6^{Windows} 4.1^{macOS} 4.6^{Linux} ES 3.2^{Linux}	3.0^{Windows} 1.2^{macOS} 3.0^{Linux}	1.3^{Windows} 1.4^{Linux}	-	34.1
HD Graphics 620	2017	Mobile	Core i7-7600U	Kaby Lake (Gen9p5)	5916	300	1150	192:24:3 (GT2)	12; FL12_1	4.6^{Windows} 4.1^{macOS} 4.6^{Linux} ES 3.2^{Linux}	3.0^{Windows} 1.2^{macOS} 3.0^{Linux}	1.3^{Windows} 1.4^{Linux}	-	34.1
UHD Graphics 620	2017	Mobile	Core i3-8130U	Kaby Lake (Gen9p5)	5917	300	1000	192:24:3 (GT2)	12; FL12_1	4.6^{Windows} 4.1^{macOS} 4.6^{Linux} ES 3.2^{Linux}	3.0^{Windows} 1.2^{macOS} 3.0^{Linux}	1.3^{Windows} 1.4^{Linux}	-	38.4
UHD Graphics 620	2017	Mobile	Core i5-8250U; Core i5-8350U	Kaby Lake (Gen9p5)	5917	300	1100	192:24:3 (GT2)	12; FL12_1	4.6^{Windows} 4.1^{macOS} 4.6^{Linux} ES 3.2^{Linux}	3.0^{Windows} 1.2^{macOS} 3.0^{Linux}	1.3^{Windows} 1.4^{Linux}	-	38.4
UHD Graphics 620	2017	Mobile	Core i7-8550U; Core i7-8650U	Kaby Lake (Gen9p5)	5917	300	1150	192:24:3 (GT2)	12; FL12_1	4.6^{Windows} 4.1^{macOS} 4.6^{Linux} ES 3.2^{Linux}	3.0^{Windows} 1.2^{macOS} 3.0^{Linux}	1.3^{Windows} 1.4^{Linux}	-	38.4
HD Graphics 630	2017	Desktop	Core i5-7400T; Core i5-7400	Kaby Lake (Gen9p5)	5912	350	1000	192:24:3 (GT2)	12; FL12_1	4.6^{Windows} 4.1^{macOS} 4.6^{Linux} ES 3.2^{Linux}	3.0^{Windows} 1.2^{macOS} 3.0^{Linux}	1.3^{Windows} 1.4^{Linux}	-	38.4
HD Graphics 630	2017	Desktop	Pentium G4600T	Kaby Lake (Gen9p5)	5912	350	1050	192:24:3 (GT2)	12; FL12_1	4.6^{Windows} 4.1^{macOS} 4.6^{Linux} ES 3.2^{Linux}	3.0^{Windows} 1.2^{macOS} 3.0^{Linux}	1.3^{Windows} 1.4^{Linux}	-	38.4
HD Graphics 630	2017	Desktop	Pentium G4600; Pentium G4620; Core i3-7100T; Core i3-7100 Core i3-7300T; Core i5-7500T; Core i5-7500 Core i5-7600T	Kaby Lake (Gen9p5)	5912	350	1100	192:24:3 (GT2)	12; FL12_1	4.6^{Windows} 4.1^{macOS} 4.6^{Linux} ES 3.2^{Linux}	3.0^{Windows} 1.2^{macOS} 3.0^{Linux}	1.3^{Windows} 1.4^{Linux}	-	38.4
HD Graphics 630	2017	Desktop	Core i3-7300 Core i3-7320 Core i3-7350K; Core i5-7600 Core i5-7600K; Core i7-7700T; Core i7-7700 Core i7-7700K	Kaby Lake (Gen9p5)	5912	350	1150	192:24:3 (GT2)	12; FL12_1	4.6^{Windows} 4.1^{macOS} 4.6^{Linux} ES 3.2^{Linux}	3.0^{Windows} 1.2^{macOS} 3.0^{Linux}	1.3^{Windows} 1.4^{Linux}	-	38.4
HD Graphics 630	2017	Mobile	Core i3-7100E; Core i3-7100H; Core i3-7102E	Kaby Lake (Gen9p5)	591B	350	950	192:24:3 (GT2)	12; FL12_1	4.6^{Windows} 4.1^{macOS} 4.6^{Linux} ES 3.2^{Linux}	3.0^{Windows} 1.2^{macOS} 3.0^{Linux}	1.3^{Windows} 1.4^{Linux}	-	38.4
HD Graphics 630	2017	Mobile	Core i5-7300HQ; Core i5-7440EQ; Core i5-7440HQ; Core i5-7442EQ; Core i7-7820EQ	Kaby Lake (Gen9p5)	591B	350	1000	192:24:3 (GT2)	12; FL12_1	4.6^{Windows} 4.1^{macOS} 4.6^{Linux} ES 3.2^{Linux}	3.0^{Windows} 1.2^{macOS} 3.0^{Linux}	1.3^{Windows} 1.4^{Linux}	-	38.4
HD Graphics 630	2017	Mobile	Core i7-7700HQ; Core i7-7820HK; Core i7-7820HQ; Core i7-7920HQ	Kaby Lake (Gen9p5)	591B	350	1100	192:24:3 (GT2)	12; FL12_1	4.6^{Windows} 4.1^{macOS} 4.6^{Linux} ES 3.2^{Linux}	3.0^{Windows} 1.2^{macOS} 3.0^{Linux}	1.3^{Windows} 1.4^{Linux}	-	38.4
HD Graphics 630	2017	Mobile	Core i5-8305G	Kaby Lake (Gen9p5)	?	350	1000	192:24:3 (GT2)	12; FL12_1	4.6^{Windows} 4.1^{macOS} 4.6^{Linux} ES 3.2^{Linux}	3.0^{Windows} 1.2^{macOS} 3.0^{Linux}	1.3^{Windows} 1.4^{Linux}	-	38.4
HD Graphics 630	2017	Mobile	Core i7-8705G; Core i7-8706G; Core i7-8709G; Core i7-8809G	Kaby Lake (Gen9p5)	?	350	1100	192:24:3 (GT2)	12; FL12_1	4.6^{Windows} 4.1^{macOS} 4.6^{Linux} ES 3.2^{Linux}	3.0^{Windows} 1.2^{macOS} 3.0^{Linux}	1.3^{Windows} 1.4^{Linux}	-	38.4
HD Graphics P630	2017	Mobile; Workstation	Xeon E3-1501L v6 Xeon E3-1501M v6 Xeon E3-1505L v6	Kaby Lake (Gen9p5)	591D	350	1000	192:24:3 (GT2)	12; FL12_1	4.6^{Windows} 4.1^{macOS} 4.6^{Linux} ES 3.2^{Linux}	3.0^{Windows} 1.2^{macOS} 3.0^{Linux}	1.3^{Windows} 1.4^{Linux}	-	38.4
HD Graphics P630	2017	Mobile; Workstation	Xeon E3-1505M v6 Xeon E3-1535M v6	Kaby Lake (Gen9p5)	591D	350	1100	192:24:3 (GT2)	12; FL12_1	4.6^{Windows} 4.1^{macOS} 4.6^{Linux} ES 3.2^{Linux}	3.0^{Windows} 1.2^{macOS} 3.0^{Linux}	1.3^{Windows} 1.4^{Linux}	-	38.4
HD Graphics P630	2017	Workstation	Xeon E3-1225 v6 Xeon E3-1245 v6 Xeon E3-1275 v6 Xeon E3-1285 v6	Kaby Lake (Gen9p5)	591D	350	1150	192:24:3 (GT2)	12; FL12_1	4.6^{Windows} 4.1^{macOS} 4.6^{Linux} ES 3.2^{Linux}	3.0^{Windows} 1.2^{macOS} 3.0^{Linux}	1.3^{Windows} 1.4^{Linux}	-	38.4
Iris Plus Graphics 640	2017	Mobile	Core i5-7260U	Kaby Lake (Gen9p5)	5926	300	950	384:48:6 (GT3)	12; FL12_1	4.6^{Windows} 4.1^{macOS} 4.6^{Linux} ES 3.2^{Linux}	3.0^{Windows} 1.2^{macOS} 3.0^{Linux}	1.3^{Windows} 1.4^{Linux}	64	34.1
Iris Plus Graphics 640	2017	Mobile	Core i5-7360U	Kaby Lake (Gen9p5)	5926	300	1000	384:48:6 (GT3)	12; FL12_1	4.6^{Windows} 4.1^{macOS} 4.6^{Linux} ES 3.2^{Linux}	3.0^{Windows} 1.2^{macOS} 3.0^{Linux}	1.3^{Windows} 1.4^{Linux}	64	34.1
Iris Plus Graphics 640	2017	Mobile	Core i7-7560U	Kaby Lake (Gen9p5)	5926	300	1050	384:48:6 (GT3)	12; FL12_1	4.6^{Windows} 4.1^{macOS} 4.6^{Linux} ES 3.2^{Linux}	3.0^{Windows} 1.2^{macOS} 3.0^{Linux}	1.3^{Windows} 1.4^{Linux}	64	34.1
Iris Plus Graphics 640	2017	Mobile	Core i7-7660U	Kaby Lake (Gen9p5)	5926	300	1100	384:48:6 (GT3)	12; FL12_1	4.6^{Windows} 4.1^{macOS} 4.6^{Linux} ES 3.2^{Linux}	3.0^{Windows} 1.2^{macOS} 3.0^{Linux}	1.3^{Windows} 1.4^{Linux}	64	34.1
Iris Plus Graphics 650	2017	Mobile	Core i3-7167U	Kaby Lake (Gen9p5)	5927	300	1000	384:48:6 (GT3)	12; FL12_1	4.6^{Windows} 4.1^{macOS} 4.6^{Linux} ES 3.2^{Linux}	3.0^{Windows} 1.2^{macOS} 3.0^{Linux}	1.3^{Windows} 1.4^{Linux}	64	34.1
Iris Plus Graphics 650	2017	Mobile	Core i5-7267U	Kaby Lake (Gen9p5)	5927	300	1050	384:48:6 (GT3)	12; FL12_1	4.6^{Windows} 4.1^{macOS} 4.6^{Linux} ES 3.2^{Linux}	3.0^{Windows} 1.2^{macOS} 3.0^{Linux}	1.3^{Windows} 1.4^{Linux}	64	34.1
Iris Plus Graphics 650	2017	Mobile	Core i5-7287U	Kaby Lake (Gen9p5)	5927	300	1100	384:48:6 (GT3)	12; FL12_1	4.6^{Windows} 4.1^{macOS} 4.6^{Linux} ES 3.2^{Linux}	3.0^{Windows} 1.2^{macOS} 3.0^{Linux}	1.3^{Windows} 1.4^{Linux}	64	34.1
Iris Plus Graphics 650	2017	Mobile	Core i7-7567U	Kaby Lake (Gen9p5)	5927	300	1150	384:48:6 (GT3)	12; FL12_1	4.6^{Windows} 4.1^{macOS} 4.6^{Linux} ES 3.2^{Linux}	3.0^{Windows} 1.2^{macOS} 3.0^{Linux}	1.3^{Windows} 1.4^{Linux}	64	34.1
UHD Graphics 610	2018	Desktop	Celeron G4900T	Coffee Lake	3E93	350	1000	96:12:2 (GT1)	12	4.6^{Windows} 4.6^{Linux} ES 3.2^{Linux}	3.0^{Windows} 3.0^{Linux}	1.3^{Windows} 1.4^{Linux}	-	38.4
UHD Graphics 610	2018	Desktop	Celeron G4900; Celeron G4920; Celeron G4930; Pentium Gold G5400T; Pentium Gold G5400	Coffee Lake	3E93	350	1050	96:12:2 (GT1)	12	4.6^{Windows} 4.6^{Linux} ES 3.2^{Linux}	3.0^{Windows} 3.0^{Linux}	1.3^{Windows} 1.4^{Linux}	-	38.4
UHD Graphics 630	2018	Desktop	Pentium Gold G5500T	Coffee Lake	3E91	350	1050	184:23:3 (GT2)	12	4.6^{Windows} 4.6^{Linux} ES 3.2^{Linux}	3.0^{Windows} 3.0^{Linux}	1.3^{Windows} 1.4^{Linux}	-	38.4
UHD Graphics 630	2018	Desktop	Pentium Gold G5500; Pentium Gold G5600; Core i3-8100T; Core i3-8100 Core i3-8300T	Coffee Lake	3E91	350	1100	184:23:3 (GT2)	12	4.6^{Windows} 4.6^{Linux} ES 3.2^{Linux}	3.0^{Windows} 3.0^{Linux}	1.3^{Windows} 1.4^{Linux}	-	38.4
UHD Graphics 630	2018	Desktop	Core i3-8300 Core i3-8350K	Coffee Lake	3E91	350	1150	184:23:3 (GT2)	12	4.6^{Windows} 4.6^{Linux} ES 3.2^{Linux}	3.0^{Windows} 3.0^{Linux}	1.3^{Windows} 1.4^{Linux}	-	38.4
UHD Graphics 630	2018	Desktop	Core i5-8400T; Core i5-8400 Core i5+8400	Coffee Lake	3E92	350	1050	192:24:3 (GT2)	12	4.6^{Windows} 4.6^{Linux} ES 3.2^{Linux}	3.0^{Windows} 3.0^{Linux}	1.3^{Windows} 1.4^{Linux}	-	42.7
UHD Graphics 630	2018	Desktop	Core i5-8500T; Core i5-8500 Core i5+8500	Coffee Lake	3E92	350	1100	192:24:3 (GT2)	12	4.6^{Windows} 4.6^{Linux} ES 3.2^{Linux}	3.0^{Windows} 3.0^{Linux}	1.3^{Windows} 1.4^{Linux}	-	42.7
UHD Graphics 630	2018	Desktop	Core i5-8600T; Core i5-8600 Core i5-8600K; Core i5-9600K	Coffee Lake	3E92	350	1150	192:24:3 (GT2)	12	4.6^{Windows} 4.6^{Linux} ES 3.2^{Linux}	3.0^{Windows} 3.0^{Linux}	1.3^{Windows} 1.4^{Linux}	-	42.7
UHD Graphics 630	2018	Desktop	Core i7-8700T; Core i7-8700 Core i7+8700 Core i7-8700K; Core i7-8086K; Core i7-9700K; Core i9-9900K; Core i9-9900KS	Coffee Lake	3E92	350	1200	192:24:3 (GT2)	12	4.6^{Windows} 4.6^{Linux} ES 3.2^{Linux}	3.0^{Windows} 3.0^{Linux}	1.3^{Windows} 1.4^{Linux}	-	42.7
UHD Graphics 630	2018	Mobile	Core i5-8300H	Coffee Lake	3E9B	350	1000	192:24:3 (GT2)	12	4.6^{Windows} 4.6^{Linux} ES 3.2^{Linux}	3.0^{Windows} 3.0^{Linux}	1.3^{Windows} 1.4^{Linux}	-	42.7
UHD Graphics 630	2018	Mobile	Core i5-8400B	Coffee Lake	3E9B	350	1050	192:24:3 (GT2)	12	4.6^{Windows} 4.6^{Linux} ES 3.2^{Linux}	3.0^{Windows} 3.0^{Linux}	1.3^{Windows} 1.4^{Linux}	-	42.7
UHD Graphics 630	2018	Mobile	Core i5-8400H; Core i7-8750H	Coffee Lake	3E9B	350	1100	192:24:3 (GT2)	12	4.6^{Windows} 4.6^{Linux} ES 3.2^{Linux}	3.0^{Windows} 3.0^{Linux}	1.3^{Windows} 1.4^{Linux}	-	42.7
UHD Graphics 630	2018	Mobile	Core i5-8500B; Core i7-8850H; Core i7-9750H; Core i7-9850H	Coffee Lake	3E9B	350	1150	192:24:3 (GT2)	12	4.6^{Windows} 4.6^{Linux} ES 3.2^{Linux}	3.0^{Windows} 3.0^{Linux}	1.3^{Windows} 1.4^{Linux}	-	42.7
UHD Graphics 630	2018	Mobile	Core i7-8700B; Core i9-8950HK	Coffee Lake	3E9B	350	1200	192:24:3 (GT2)	12	4.6^{Windows} 4.6^{Linux} ES 3.2^{Linux}	3.0^{Windows} 3.0^{Linux}	1.3^{Windows} 1.4^{Linux}	-	42.7
UHD Graphics 630	2018	Mobile; Workstation	Xeon E-2176M; Xeon E-2186M	Coffee Lake	3E9B	350	1200	192:24:3 (GT2)	12	4.6^{Windows} 4.6^{Linux} ES 3.2^{Linux}	3.0^{Windows} 3.0^{Linux}	1.3^{Windows} 1.4^{Linux}	-	42.7
Iris Plus Graphics 645	2018	Mobile	Core i5-8257U	Coffee Lake	3EA6	300	1050	384:48:6 (GT3)	12	4.6^{Windows} 4.6^{Linux} ES 3.2^{Linux}	3.0^{Windows} 3.0^{Linux}	1.3^{Windows} 1.4^{Linux}	128	38.4
Iris Plus Graphics 645	2018	Mobile	Core i7-8557U	Coffee Lake	3EA6	300	1150	384:48:6 (GT3)	12	4.6^{Windows} 4.6^{Linux} ES 3.2^{Linux}	3.0^{Windows} 3.0^{Linux}	1.3^{Windows} 1.4^{Linux}	128	38.4
Iris Plus Graphics 655	2018	Mobile	Core i3-8109U; Core i5-8259U	Coffee Lake	3EA5	300	1050	384:48:6 (GT3)	12	4.6^{Windows} 4.6^{Linux} ES 3.2^{Linux}	3.0^{Windows} 3.0^{Linux}	1.3^{Windows} 1.4^{Linux}	128	38.4
Iris Plus Graphics 655	2018	Mobile	Core i5-8259U	Coffee Lake	3EA5	300	1100	384:48:6 (GT3)	12	4.6^{Windows} 4.6^{Linux} ES 3.2^{Linux}	3.0^{Windows} 3.0^{Linux}	1.3^{Windows} 1.4^{Linux}	128	38.4
Iris Plus Graphics 655	2018	Mobile	Core i7-8559U; Core i7-8569U	Coffee Lake	3EA5	300	1200	384:48:6 (GT3)	12	4.6^{Windows} 4.6^{Linux} ES 3.2^{Linux}	3.0^{Windows} 3.0^{Linux}	1.3^{Windows} 1.4^{Linux}	128	38.4

== Gen11 ==
- ^{1} FP32 ALUs : EUs : Subslices
- Each EU contains 2 x 128-bit FPUs. One supports 32-bit and 64-bit integer, FP16, FP32, FP64, and transcendental math functions, and the other supports only 32-bit and 64-bit integer, FP16 and FP32. Thus the FP16 (or 16-bit integer) FLOPS is twice the FP32 (or 32-bit integer) FLOPS. Since the throughput of FP64 instructions are 2 cycles, the FP64 FLOPS is a quarter of the FP32 FLOPS.
- Each Subslice contains 8 EUs and a sampler (4 tex/clk), and has 64 KB shared memory.
- Intel Quick Sync Video
- For Windows 10, the total system memory that is available for graphics use is half the system memory.
- No eDRAM.

Specifications of Intel HD Graphics series
Name	Release year	Market	Processor		Device ID	Core config^{1}	Clock rate		API support				Memory bandwidth (GB/s)
Name	Release year	Market	Code name	Model	Device ID	Core config^{1}	Min (MHz)	Max (MHz)	Direct3D	OpenGL	OpenCL	Vulkan	Memory bandwidth (GB/s)
UHD Graphics	2019	Mobile	Ice Lake	Core i3-1000G1; Core i3-1005G1	8A58	256:32:4 (GT1)	300	900	12; FL12_1	4.6^{Windows} 4.6^{Linux} ES 3.2^{Linux}	3.0^{Windows} 3.0^{Linux}	1.4^{Windows} 1.4^{Linux}	59.7
UHD Graphics	2019	Mobile	Ice Lake	Core i5-1035G1	8A56	256:32:4 (GT1)	300	1050	12; FL12_1	4.6^{Windows} 4.6^{Linux} ES 3.2^{Linux}	3.0^{Windows} 3.0^{Linux}	1.4^{Windows} 1.4^{Linux}	59.7
Iris Plus Graphics	2019	Mobile	Ice Lake	Core i3-1000G4	8A5C	384:48:6 (GT1.5)	300	900	12; FL12_1	4.6^{Windows} 4.6^{Linux} ES 3.2^{Linux}	3.0^{Windows} 3.0^{Linux}	1.4^{Windows} 1.4^{Linux}	59.7
Iris Plus Graphics	2019	Mobile	Ice Lake	Core i5-1030G4	8A5C	384:48:6 (GT1.5)	300	1050	12; FL12_1	4.6^{Windows} 4.6^{Linux} ES 3.2^{Linux}	3.0^{Windows} 3.0^{Linux}	1.4^{Windows} 1.4^{Linux}	59.7
Iris Plus Graphics	2019	Mobile	Ice Lake	Core i5-1035G4	8A5A	384:48:6 (GT1.5)	300	1050	12; FL12_1	4.6^{Windows} 4.6^{Linux} ES 3.2^{Linux}	3.0^{Windows} 3.0^{Linux}	1.4^{Windows} 1.4^{Linux}	59.7
Iris Plus Graphics	2019	Mobile	Ice Lake	Core i5-1030G7; Core i5-1030NG7	8A51	512:64:8 (GT2)	300	1050	12; FL12_1	4.6^{Windows} 4.6^{Linux} ES 3.2^{Linux}	3.0^{Windows} 3.0^{Linux}	1.4^{Windows} 1.4^{Linux}	59.7
Iris Plus Graphics	2019	Mobile	Ice Lake	Core i7-1060G7; Core i7-1060NG7	8A51	512:64:8 (GT2)	300	1100	12; FL12_1	4.6^{Windows} 4.6^{Linux} ES 3.2^{Linux}	3.0^{Windows} 3.0^{Linux}	1.4^{Windows} 1.4^{Linux}	59.7
Iris Plus Graphics	2019	Mobile	Ice Lake	Core i5-1035G7	8A52	512:64:8 (GT2)	300	1050	12; FL12_1	4.6^{Windows} 4.6^{Linux} ES 3.2^{Linux}	3.0^{Windows} 3.0^{Linux}	1.4^{Windows} 1.4^{Linux}	59.7
Iris Plus Graphics	2019	Mobile	Ice Lake	Core i7-1065G7	8A52	512:64:8 (GT2)	300	1100	12; FL12_1	4.6^{Windows} 4.6^{Linux} ES 3.2^{Linux}	3.0^{Windows} 3.0^{Linux}	1.4^{Windows} 1.4^{Linux}	59.7
Iris Plus Graphics	2019	Mobile	Ice Lake	Core i5-1038G7	8A53	512:64:8 (GT2)	300	1050	12; FL12_1	4.6^{Windows} 4.6^{Linux} ES 3.2^{Linux}	3.0^{Windows} 3.0^{Linux}	1.4^{Windows} 1.4^{Linux}	59.7
Iris Plus Graphics	2019	Mobile	Ice Lake	Core i7-1068G7	8A53	512:64:8 (GT2)	300	1100	12; FL12_1	4.6^{Windows} 4.6^{Linux} ES 3.2^{Linux}	3.0^{Windows} 3.0^{Linux}	1.4^{Windows} 1.4^{Linux}	59.7

== Gen12 ==
Intel Xe is a GPGPU and dGPU product line first released in 2020, in the mobile Tiger Lake line and Rocket Lake line.

- ^{1} FP32 ALUs: EUs: Subslices

Name	Release year	Market	Processor		Device ID	Core config^{1}	Clock rate		API support				Memory bandwidth (GB/s)
Name	Release year	Market	Code name	Model	Device ID	Core config^{1}	Min (MHz)	Max (MHz)	Direct3D	OpenGL	OpenCL	Vulkan	Memory bandwidth (GB/s)
UHD Graphics 730	2020	Desktop	Rocket Lake	Core i5-11400T	4C8B	192:24:3	350	1200	12; FL12_1	4.6^{Windows} 4.6^{Linux} ES 3.2^{Linux}	3.0^{Windows} 3.0^{Linux}	1.4^{Windows} 1.4^{Linux}	51.2
UHD Graphics 730	2020	Desktop	Rocket Lake	Core i5-11400	4C8B	192:24:3	350	1300	12; FL12_1	4.6^{Windows} 4.6^{Linux} ES 3.2^{Linux}	3.0^{Windows} 3.0^{Linux}	1.4^{Windows} 1.4^{Linux}	51.2
UHD Graphics 750	2020	Desktop	Rocket Lake	Core i5-11500T	4C8A	256:32:4	350	1200	12; FL12_1	4.6^{Windows} 4.6^{Linux} ES 3.2^{Linux}	3.0^{Windows} 3.0^{Linux}	1.4^{Windows} 1.4^{Linux}	51.2
UHD Graphics 750	2020	Desktop	Rocket Lake	Core i5-11500 Core i5-11600 Core i5-11600K; Core i5-11600T; Core i7-11700 Core i7-11700K; Core i7-11700T; Core i9-11900 Core i9-11900K; Core i9-11900T	4C8A	256:32:4	350	1300	12; FL12_1	4.6^{Windows} 4.6^{Linux} ES 3.2^{Linux}	3.0^{Windows} 3.0^{Linux}	1.4^{Windows} 1.4^{Linux}	51.2
UHD Graphics	2020	Mobile	Tiger Lake	Core i3-1110G4 Core i3-1120G4	9A78	384:48:6	400	1100	12; FL12_1	4.6^{Windows} 4.6^{Linux} ES 3.2^{Linux}	3.0^{Windows} 3.0^{Linux}	1.4^{Windows} 1.4^{Linux}	59.7
UHD Graphics	2020	Mobile	Tiger Lake	Celeron 6305 Pentium Gold 7505; Core i3-1115G4; Core i3-1125G4	9A78	384:48:6	400	1250	12; FL12_1	4.6^{Windows} 4.6^{Linux} ES 3.2^{Linux}	3.0^{Windows} 3.0^{Linux}	1.4^{Windows} 1.4^{Linux}	59.7
Iris Xe Graphics	2020	Mobile	Tiger Lake	Core i5-1130G7 Core i5-1140G7	9A40	640:80:6	400	1100	12; FL12_1	4.6^{Windows} 4.6^{Linux} ES 3.2^{Linux}	3.0^{Windows} 3.0^{Linux}	1.4^{Windows} 1.4^{Linux}	68.2
Iris Xe Graphics	2020	Mobile	Tiger Lake	Core i7-1160G7 Core i7-1180G7	9A40	768:96:6	400	1100	12; FL12_1	4.6^{Windows} 4.6^{Linux} ES 3.2^{Linux}	3.0^{Windows} 3.0^{Linux}	1.4^{Windows} 1.4^{Linux}	68.2
Iris Xe Graphics	2020	Mobile	Tiger Lake	Core i5-1135G7 Core i5-11300H Core i5-1145G7	9A49	640:80:6	400	1300	12; FL12_1	4.6^{Windows} 4.6^{Linux} ES 3.2^{Linux}	3.0^{Windows} 3.0^{Linux}	1.4^{Windows} 1.4^{Linux}	68.2
Iris Xe Graphics	2020	Mobile	Tiger Lake	Core i7-1165G7	9A49	768:96:6	400	1300	12; FL12_1	4.6^{Windows} 4.6^{Linux} ES 3.2^{Linux}	3.0^{Windows} 3.0^{Linux}	1.4^{Windows} 1.4^{Linux}	68.2
Iris Xe Graphics	2020	Mobile	Tiger Lake	Core i5-11320H Core i7-1185G7; Core i7-11370H; Core i7-11375H	9A49	768:96:6	400	1350	12; FL12_1	4.6^{Windows} 4.6^{Linux} ES 3.2^{Linux}	3.0^{Windows} 3.0^{Linux}	1.4^{Windows} 1.4^{Linux}	68.2
Iris Xe Graphics	2020	Mobile	Tiger Lake	Core i7-1195G7 Core i7-11390H	9A49	768:96:6	400	1400	12; FL12_1	4.6^{Windows} 4.6^{Linux} ES 3.2^{Linux}	3.0^{Windows} 3.0^{Linux}	1.4^{Windows} 1.4^{Linux}	68.2

== Gen12.2 ==
Intel Xe is a GPGPU and dGPU product line first released in 2021, in Alder Lake and Raptor Lake line.

- Support up to 4 screens
- ^{1} FP32 ALUs: EUs: Subslices

Name	Release year	Market	Processor		Device ID	Core config^{1}	Clock rate		API support				Memory bandwidth (GB/s)
Name	Release year	Market	Code name	Model	Device ID	Core config^{1}	Min (MHz)	Max (MHz)	Direct3D	OpenGL	OpenCL	Vulkan	Memory bandwidth (GB/s)
Iris Xe Max	2021	Mobile	DG1		4905	768:96:6	300	1650	12; FL12_1	4.6^{Windows} 4.6^{Linux} ES 3.2^{Linux}	3.0^{Windows} 3.0^{Linux}	1.4^{Windows} 1.4^{Linux}	68.2
Iris Xe Pod	2021	Desktop	DG1		4906	768:96:6	300	1650	12; FL12_1	4.6^{Windows} 4.6^{Linux} ES 3.2^{Linux}	3.0^{Windows} 3.0^{Linux}	1.4^{Windows} 1.4^{Linux}	68.2
GPU SG-18M	2021	Server	DG1		4907	768:96:6	300	1650	12; FL12_1	4.6^{Windows} 4.6^{Linux} ES 3.2^{Linux}	3.0^{Windows} 3.0^{Linux}	1.4^{Windows} 1.4^{Linux}	68.2
Iris Xe Graphics	2021	Desktop	DG1		4908	768:96:6	300	1650	12; FL12_1	4.6^{Windows} 4.6^{Linux} ES 3.2^{Linux}	3.0^{Windows} 3.0^{Linux}	1.4^{Windows} 1.4^{Linux}	68.2
UHD Graphics 710	2021	Desktop	Alder Lake	Celeron G6900 Celeron G6900T	4693	128:16:2	300	1300	12; FL12_1	4.6^{Windows} 4.6^{Linux} ES 3.2^{Linux}	3.0^{Windows} 3.0^{Linux}	1.4^{Windows} 1.4^{Linux}	76.8
UHD Graphics 710	2021	Desktop	Alder Lake	Pentium Gold G7400 Pentium Gold G7400T	4693	128:16:2	300	1350	12; FL12_1	4.6^{Windows} 4.6^{Linux} ES 3.2^{Linux}	3.0^{Windows} 3.0^{Linux}	1.4^{Windows} 1.4^{Linux}	76.8
UHD Graphics 730	2021	Desktop	Alder Lake	i3-12100 i3-12100T	4692	192:24:3	300	1400	12; FL12_1	4.6^{Windows} 4.6^{Linux} ES 3.2^{Linux}	3.0^{Windows} 3.0^{Linux}	1.4^{Windows} 1.4^{Linux}	76.8
UHD Graphics 730	2021	Desktop	Alder Lake	i3-12300 i3-12300T i5-12400 i5-12400T	4692	192:24:3	300	1450	12; FL12_1	4.6^{Windows} 4.6^{Linux} ES 3.2^{Linux}	3.0^{Windows} 3.0^{Linux}	1.4^{Windows} 1.4^{Linux}	76.8
UHD Graphics 770	2021	Desktop	Alder Lake	i5-12500 i5-12500T i5-12600 i5-12600T	4690	256:32:4	300	1450	12; FL12_1	4.6^{Windows} 4.6^{Linux} ES 3.2^{Linux}	3.0^{Windows} 3.0^{Linux}	1.4^{Windows} 1.4^{Linux}	76.8
UHD Graphics 770	2021	Desktop	Alder Lake	i5-12600K i7-12700 i7-12700T i7-12700K	4680	256:32:4	300	1500	12; FL12_1	4.6^{Windows} 4.6^{Linux} ES 3.2^{Linux}	3.0^{Windows} 3.0^{Linux}	1.4^{Windows} 1.4^{Linux}	76.8
UHD Graphics 770	2021	Desktop	Alder Lake	i9-12900 i9-12900T i9-12900K i9-12900KS	4680	256:32:4	300	1550	12; FL12_1	4.6^{Windows} 4.6^{Linux} ES 3.2^{Linux}	3.0^{Windows} 3.0^{Linux}	1.4^{Windows} 1.4^{Linux}	76.8
UHD Graphics	2021	Mobile	Alder Lake	Celeron 7300 Pentium 8500	46C3	384:48:6	300	800	12; FL12_1	4.6^{Windows} 4.6^{Linux} ES 3.2^{Linux}	3.0^{Windows} 3.0^{Linux}	1.4^{Windows} 1.4^{Linux}	76.8
UHD Graphics	2021	Mobile	Alder Lake	i3-1210U	46C3	512:64:8	300	850	12; FL12_1	4.6^{Windows} 4.6^{Linux} ES 3.2^{Linux}	3.0^{Windows} 3.0^{Linux}	1.4^{Windows} 1.4^{Linux}	76.8
UHD Graphics	2021	Mobile	Alder Lake	Celeron 7305 Pentium 8505	46B3	384:48:6	300	1100	12; FL12_1	4.6^{Windows} 4.6^{Linux} ES 3.2^{Linux}	3.0^{Windows} 3.0^{Linux}	1.4^{Windows} 1.4^{Linux}	76.8
UHD Graphics	2021	Mobile	Alder Lake	i3-1215U i3-1220P	46B3	512:64:8	300	1100	12; FL12_1	4.6^{Windows} 4.6^{Linux} ES 3.2^{Linux}	3.0^{Windows} 3.0^{Linux}	1.4^{Windows} 1.4^{Linux}	76.8
UHD Graphics	2021	Mobile	Alder Lake	i5-12450H	46A3	384:48:6	300	1200	12; FL12_1	4.6^{Windows} 4.6^{Linux} ES 3.2^{Linux}	3.0^{Windows} 3.0^{Linux}	1.4^{Windows} 1.4^{Linux}	76.8
UHD Graphics	2021	Mobile	Alder Lake	i7-12650H	46A3	512:64:8	300	1400	12; FL12_1	4.6^{Windows} 4.6^{Linux} ES 3.2^{Linux}	3.0^{Windows} 3.0^{Linux}	1.4^{Windows} 1.4^{Linux}	76.8
Iris Xe Graphics	2021	Mobile	Alder Lake	i5-1230U	46AA	640:80:6	300	850	12; FL12_1	4.6^{Windows} 4.6^{Linux} ES 3.2^{Linux}	3.0^{Windows} 3.0^{Linux}	1.4^{Windows} 1.4^{Linux}	76.8
Iris Xe Graphics	2021	Mobile	Alder Lake	i5-1240U	46AA	640:80:6	300	900	12; FL12_1	4.6^{Windows} 4.6^{Linux} ES 3.2^{Linux}	3.0^{Windows} 3.0^{Linux}	1.4^{Windows} 1.4^{Linux}	76.8
Iris Xe Graphics	2021	Mobile	Alder Lake	i7-1250U i7-1260U	46AA	768:96:6	300	950	12; FL12_1	4.6^{Windows} 4.6^{Linux} ES 3.2^{Linux}	3.0^{Windows} 3.0^{Linux}	1.4^{Windows} 1.4^{Linux}	76.8
Iris Xe Graphics	2021	Mobile	Alder Lake	i5-1235U i5-1245U	46A8	640:80:6	300	1200	12; FL12_1	4.6^{Windows} 4.6^{Linux} ES 3.2^{Linux}	3.0^{Windows} 3.0^{Linux}	1.4^{Windows} 1.4^{Linux}	76.8
Iris Xe Graphics	2021	Mobile	Alder Lake	i7-1255U i7-1265U	46A8	768:96:6	300	1250	12; FL12_1	4.6^{Windows} 4.6^{Linux} ES 3.2^{Linux}	3.0^{Windows} 3.0^{Linux}	1.4^{Windows} 1.4^{Linux}	76.8
Iris Xe Graphics	2021	Mobile	Alder Lake	i5-1240P i5-12500H	46A6	640:80:6	300	1300	12; FL12_1	4.6^{Windows} 4.6^{Linux} ES 3.2^{Linux}	3.0^{Windows} 3.0^{Linux}	1.4^{Windows} 1.4^{Linux}	76.8
Iris Xe Graphics	2021	Mobile	Alder Lake	i5-1250P i5-12600H	46A6	640:80:6	300	1400	12; FL12_1	4.6^{Windows} 4.6^{Linux} ES 3.2^{Linux}	3.0^{Windows} 3.0^{Linux}	1.4^{Windows} 1.4^{Linux}	76.8
Iris Xe Graphics	2021	Mobile	Alder Lake	i7-1260P i7-1270P i7-12700H i7-12800H	46A6	768:96:6	300	1400	12; FL12_1	4.6^{Windows} 4.6^{Linux} ES 3.2^{Linux}	3.0^{Windows} 3.0^{Linux}	1.4^{Windows} 1.4^{Linux}	76.8
Iris Xe Graphics	2021	Mobile	Alder Lake	i7-1280P i9-12900H i9-12900HK	46A6	768:96:6	300	1450	12; FL12_1	4.6^{Windows} 4.6^{Linux} ES 3.2^{Linux}	3.0^{Windows} 3.0^{Linux}	1.4^{Windows} 1.4^{Linux}	76.8
UHD Graphics 770	2022	Desktop	Raptor Lake	i5-13600K	A780	256:32:4	300	1500	12; FL12_1	4.6^{Windows} 4.6^{Linux} ES 3.2^{Linux}	3.0^{Windows} 3.0^{Linux}	1.4^{Windows} 1.4^{Linux}	89.6
UHD Graphics 770	2022	Desktop	Raptor Lake	i7-13700K	A780	256:32:4	300	1600	12; FL12_1	4.6^{Windows} 4.6^{Linux} ES 3.2^{Linux}	3.0^{Windows} 3.0^{Linux}	1.4^{Windows} 1.4^{Linux}	89.6
UHD Graphics 770	2022	Desktop	Raptor Lake	i9-13900K	A780	256:32:4	300	1650	12; FL12_1	4.6^{Windows} 4.6^{Linux} ES 3.2^{Linux}	3.0^{Windows} 3.0^{Linux}	1.4^{Windows} 1.4^{Linux}	89.6

== Gen 12.5 ==
Model	Launch	Code name(s)	Process	Transistors (billion)	Die size (mm^{2})	Core config (Note: shading cores (ALU):texture mapping units (TMU):render output units (ROP):ray tracing units:tensor cores (XMX):execution Units)	Cache		Core clock (MHz) (Note: Boost values (if available) are stated below the base value in italic.)	Fillrate (Note: Pixel fillrate is calculated as the lowest of three numbers: number of ROPs multiplied by the base core clock speed, number of rasterizers multiplied by the number of fragments they can generate per rasterizer multiplied by the base core clock speed, and the number of streaming multiprocessors multiplied by the number of fragments per clock that they can output multiplied by the base clock rate.) (Note: Texture fillrate is calculated as the number of texture mapping units (TMUs) multiplied by the base (or boost) core clock speed.)		Memory					Processing power (TFLOPS)			TDP	Bus interface
Model	Launch	Code name(s)	Process	Transistors (billion)	Die size (mm^{2})	Core config	L1	L2	Core clock (MHz)	Pixel (GP/s)	Texture (GT/s)	Type	Size	Bandwidth (GB/s)	Bus width	Clock (MT/s)	Bfloat16	Single precision	Double precision	TDP	Bus interface
Data Center GPU Max 1100	Jan 10, 2023	Xe-HPC (Ponte Vecchio)	Multiple	100	1280	7168:448:0:56:448:448	28 MB	204 MB	1000; 1550	0	448.0; 694.4	HBM2E	48 GB	1228.8	3072-bit	3200	352	14.336; 22.221		300 W	PCIe 5.0 x16
Data Center GPU Max 1350	abandoned	Xe-HPC (Ponte Vecchio)	Multiple	100	1280	14336:896:0:112:896:896	56 MB	408 MB	750; 1550	0	672.0; 1388.8	HBM2E	96 GB	2457.6	6144-bit	3200	704	21.504; 44.442		450 W	PCIe 5.0 x16
Data Center GPU Max 1550	Jan 10, 2023	Xe-HPC (Ponte Vecchio)	Multiple	100	1280	16384:1024:0:128:1024:1024	64 MB	408 MB	900; 1600	0	921.6; 1638.4	HBM2E	128 GB	3276.8	8192-bit	3200	832	29.491; 54.423		600 W	PCIe 5.0 x16

== Gen 12.7 ==
=== Desktop ===
Overview of Intel Arc Alchemist GPUs
Branding and Model		Launch	MSRP (USD)	Code name	Process	Transistors (billion)	Die size (mm^{2})	Core config (Note: Shading cores (ALU): texture mapping units (TMU): render output units (ROP): ray tracing units (tensor cores (XMX): execution units: render slices))	L2 cache	Clock rate (MHz) (Note: Boost values (if available) are stated below the base value in italic.)	Fillrate		Memory					Processing power (TFLOPS)			TDP	Bus interface
Branding and Model		Launch	MSRP (USD)	Code name	Process	Transistors (billion)	Die size (mm^{2})	Core config	L2 cache	Clock rate (MHz)	Pixel (GP/s)	Texture (GT/s)	Type	Size (GB)	Bandwidth (GB/s)	Bus width	Clock (MT/s)	Half precision (base)	Single precision (base)	Double precision (base)	TDP	Bus interface
Arc 3	A310	Sep 28, 2022	$110	ACM-G11 (DG2-128)	TSMC; N6	7.2	157	6 Xe cores 768:32:16:6 (192:96:2)	4 MB	2000; 2000	32	64	GDDR6	4 GB	124	64-bit	15500	6.144	3.072	n/a	75 W	PCIe 4.0 x8
Arc 3	A380	Jun 14, 2022	$139	ACM-G11 (DG2-128)	TSMC; N6	7.2	157	8 Xe cores 1024:64:32:8 (256:128:2)	4 MB	2000; 2050	64; 65.6	128; 131.2	GDDR6	6 GB	186	96-bit	15500	8.192; 8.3968	4.096; 4.1984	n/a n/a	75 W	PCIe 4.0 x8
Arc 5	A580	Oct 10, 2023	$179	ACM-G10 (DG2-512)	TSMC; N6	21.7	406	24 Xe cores 3072:192:96:24 (768:384:6)	8 MB	1700; 1700	163.2	326.4	GDDR6	8 GB	512	256-bit	16000	20.890	10.445	n/a	175 W	PCIe 4.0 x16
Arc 7	A750	Oct 14, 2022	$289	ACM-G10 (DG2-512)	TSMC; N6	21.7	406	28 Xe cores 3584:224:112:28 (896:448:7)	16 MB	2050; 2400	229.6; 268.8	393.6; 460.8	GDDR6	8 GB	512	256-bit	16000	29.3888; 34.4064	14.6944; 17.2032	n/a n/a	225 W	PCIe 4.0 x16
Arc 7	A770 8GB	Oct 14, 2022	$329	ACM-G10 (DG2-512)	TSMC; N6	21.7	406	32 Xe cores 4096:256:128:32 (1024:512:8)	16 MB	2100; 2400	268.8; 307.2	537.6; 614.4	GDDR6	8 GB	512	256-bit	16000	34.4064; 39.3216	17.2032; 19.6608	n/a n/a	225 W	PCIe 4.0 x16
Arc 7	A770 16GB	Oct 14, 2022	$349	ACM-G10 (DG2-512)	TSMC; N6	21.7	406	32 Xe cores 4096:256:128:32 (1024:512:8)	16 MB	2100; 2400	268.8; 307.2	537.6; 614.4	GDDR6	16 GB	560	256-bit	17500	34.4064; 39.3216	17.2032; 19.6608	n/a n/a	225 W	PCIe 4.0 x16

=== Mobile ===
Overview of Intel Arc Alchemist GPUs for mobile devices
Branding and Model		Launch	Code name	Process	Transistors (billion)	Die size (mm^{2})	Core config (Note: Shading cores (ALU): texture mapping units (TMU): render output units (ROP): ray tracing units (tensor cores (XMX): execution units: render slices)) (Note: Texture fillrate is calculated as the number of texture mapping units (TMUs) multiplied by the base (or boost) core clock speed.)	L2 cache	Core clock (MHz) (Note: Boost values (if available) are stated below the base value in italic.)	Fillrate (Note: Pixel fillrate is calculated as the lowest of three numbers: number of ROPs multiplied by the base core clock speed, number of rasterizers multiplied by the number of fragments they can generate per rasterizer multiplied by the base core clock speed, and the number of streaming multiprocessors multiplied by the number of fragments per clock that they can output multiplied by the base clock rate.)		Memory					Processing power (TFLOPS)			TDP	Bus interface
Branding and Model		Launch	Code name	Process	Transistors (billion)	Die size (mm^{2})	Core config	L2 cache	Core clock (MHz)	Pixel (GP/s)	Texture (GT/s)	Type	Size	Bandwidth (GB/s)	Bus width	Clock (MT/s)	Half precision	Single precision	Double precision	TDP	Bus interface
Arc 3	A350M	Mar 30, 2022	ACM-G11 (DG2-128)	TSMC; N6	7.2	157	6 Xe cores 768:48:24:6 (96:96:2)	4 MB	1150; 2200	27.6; 52.8	55.2; 105.6	GDDR6	4 GB	112	64-bit	14000	3.5328; 6.7584	1.7664; 3.3792	0.4416; 0.8448	25–35 W	PCIe 4.0 ×8
Arc 3	A370M	Mar 30, 2022	ACM-G11 (DG2-128)	TSMC; N6	7.2	157	8 Xe cores 1024:64:32:8 (128:128:2)	4 MB	1550; 2050	49.6; 65.6	99.2; 131.2	GDDR6	4 GB	112	64-bit	14000	6.3488; 8.3968	3.1744; 4.1984	0.7936; 1.0496	35–50 W	PCIe 4.0 ×8
Arc 5	A530M	Q3 2023	ACM-G12 (DG2-256)	TSMC; N6			12 Xe cores 1536:96:48:12 (192:192:3)	8 MB	1300			GDDR6	4 GB; 8 GB	224	128-bit	14000				65–95 W	PCIe 4.0 ×8
Arc 5	A550M	Q2 2022	ACM-G10 (DG2-512)	TSMC; N6	21.7	406	16 Xe cores 2048:128:64:16 (256:256:4)	8 MB	900; 1700	57.6; 108.8	115.2; 217.6	GDDR6	8 GB	224	128-bit	14000	7.3728; 13.9264	3.6864; 6.9632	0.9216; 1.7408	60–80 W	PCIe 4.0 ×8
Arc 5	A570M	Q3 2023	ACM-G12 (DG2-256)	TSMC; N6			16 Xe cores 2048:128:64:16 (256:256:4)	8 MB	1300			GDDR6	8 GB	224	128-bit	14000				75–95 W	PCIe 4.0 ×8
Arc 7	A730M	Q2 2022	ACM-G10 (DG2-512)	TSMC; N6	21.7	406	24 Xe cores 3072:192:96:24 (384:384:6)	12 MB	1100; 2050	105.6; 196.8	211.2; 393.6	GDDR6	12 GB	336	192-bit	14000	13.5168; 25.1904	6.7584; 12.5952	1.6896; 3.1488	80–120 W	PCIe 4.0 ×16
Arc 7	A770M	Q2 2022	ACM-G10 (DG2-512)	TSMC; N6	21.7	406	32 Xe cores 4096:256:128:32 (512:512:8)	16 MB	1650; 2050	211.2; 262.4	422.4; 524.8	GDDR6	16 GB	512	256-bit	16000	27.0336; 33.5872	13.5168; 16.7936	3.3792; 4.1984	120–150 W	PCIe 4.0 ×16

=== Workstation ===
Overview of Intel Arc Alchemist GPUs for Workstations
Branding and Model		Launch	Code name	Process	Transistors (billion)	Die size (mm^{2})	Core config (Note: Shading cores (ALU): texture mapping units (TMU): render output units (ROP): ray tracing units (tensor cores (XMX): execution Units: render slices))	L2 cache	Core clock (MHz) (Note: Boost values (if available) are stated below the base value in italic.)	Fillrate (Note: Pixel fillrate is calculated as the lowest of three numbers: number of ROPs multiplied by the base core clock speed, number of rasterizers multiplied by the number of fragments they can generate per rasterizer multiplied by the base core clock speed, and the number of streaming multiprocessors multiplied by the number of fragments per clock that they can output multiplied by the base clock rate.) (Note: Texture fillrate is calculated as the number of texture mapping units (TMUs) multiplied by the base (or boost) core clock speed.)		Memory					Processing power (TFLOPS)			TDP	Bus interface
Branding and Model		Launch	Code name	Process	Transistors (billion)	Die size (mm^{2})	Core config	L2 cache	Core clock (MHz)	Pixel (GP/s)	Texture (GT/s)	Type	Size	Bandwidth (GB/s)	Bus width	Clock (MT/s)	Half precision	Single precision	Double precision	TDP	Bus interface
Arc Pro	A30M	Aug 8, 2022	ACM-G11 (DG2-128)	TSMC; N6	7.2	157	8 Xe cores 1024:64:32:8 (128:128:2)	4 MB	1550			GDDR6	4 GB	112	64-bit	14000		4.20		50 W	PCIe 4.0 x8
Arc Pro	A40	Aug 8, 2022	ACM-G11 (DG2-128)	TSMC; N6	7.2	157	8 Xe cores 1024:64:32:8 (128:128:2)	4 MB	1550			GDDR6	6 GB	192	96-bit	16000		5.02		50 W	PCIe 4.0 x8
Arc Pro	A50	Aug 8, 2022	ACM-G11 (DG2-128)	TSMC; N6	7.2	157	8 Xe cores 1024:64:32:8 (128:128:2)	4 MB	2050			GDDR6	6 GB	192	96-bit	16000		5.02		75 W	PCIe 4.0 x8
Arc Pro	A60M	June 6, 2023	ACM-G12 (DG2-256)	TSMC; N6			16 Xe cores 2048:128:64:16 (256:256:4)		1300			GDDR6	8 GB	256	128-bit	16000		9.42		95 W	PCIe 4.0 x16
Arc Pro	A60	June 6, 2023	ACM-G12 (DG2-256)	TSMC; N6			16 Xe cores 2048:128:64:16 (256:256:4)		2000			GDDR6	12 GB	384	192-bit	16000		10.04		130 W	PCIe 4.0 x16

== Battlemage based ==
=== Desktop ===
Overview of Intel Arc Battlemage GPUs
Branding and Model		Launch	MSRP (USD)	Code name	Process	Transistors (billion)	Die size (mm^{2})	Core		Cache		Memory					Fillrate (Note: Pixel fillrate is calculated as the number of render output units (ROPs) multiplied by the base (or boost) core clock speed.) (Note: Texture fillrate is calculated as the number of texture mapping units (TMUs) multiplied by the base (or boost) core clock speed.)		Processing power (TFLOPS)			TDP	Bus interface
Branding and Model		Launch	MSRP (USD)	Code name	Process	Transistors (billion)	Die size (mm^{2})	Core Config (Note: X^{e}2-HPG Cores (X^{e} Vector Engines) Unified Shaders : Texture Mapping Units : Render Output Units : Ray Tracing Cores : XMX Cores)	Clock (MHz) (Note: Boost values (if available) are stated below the base value in italics.)	L1	L2	Type	Size	Bandwidth (GB/s)	Bus width	Clock (MT/s)	Pixel (GP/s)	Texture (GT/s)	Half precision	Single precision	Double precision	TDP	Bus interface
Arc 5	B570	Jan 16, 2025	$219	BMG-G21	TSMC N5	19.6	272	18 X^{e} Cores (144); 2304:144:72:18:144 (128:128:5)	1700; 2500	4.5 MB	10 MB	GDDR6	10 GB	380	160-bit	19000	122.4 200.0	244.8; 360.0	23.04	11.52	1.44	150 W	PCIe 4.0 x8
Arc 5	B580	Dec 13, 2024	$249	BMG-G21	TSMC N5	19.6	272	20 X^{e} Cores (160); 2560:160:80:20:160 (160:160:5)	1700; 2670	5 MB	12 MB	GDDR6	12 GB	456	192-bit	19000	136.0; 213.6	272.0; 427.2	27.34	13.67	1.709	190 W	PCIe 4.0 x8

=== Workstation ===
Overview of Intel Arc Battlemage GPUs for Workstations
Branding and Model		Launch	MSRP (USD)	Code name	Process	Transistors (billion)	Die size (mm^{2})	Core		L2 cache	Fillrate (Note: Pixel fillrate is calculated as the lowest of three numbers: number of ROPs multiplied by the base core clock speed, number of rasterizers multiplied by the number of fragments they can generate per rasterizer multiplied by the base core clock speed, and the number of streaming multiprocessors multiplied by the number of fragments per clock that they can output multiplied by the base clock rate.) (Note: Texture fillrate is calculated as the number of texture mapping units (TMUs) multiplied by the base (or boost) core clock speed.)		Memory					Processing power (TFLOPS)				TDP	Bus interface
Branding and Model		Launch	MSRP (USD)	Code name	Process	Transistors (billion)	Die size (mm^{2})	Config (Note: Shading cores (ALU): texture mapping units (TMU): render output units (ROP): ray tracing units (tensor cores (XMX): execution Units: render slices))	Clock (MHz) (Note: Boost values (if available) are stated below the base value in italic.)	L2 cache	Pixel (GP/s)	Texture (GT/s)	Type	Size	Bandwidth (GB/s)	Bus width	Clock (MT/s)	Half precision	Single precision	Double precision	XMX Half Precision	TDP	Bus interface
Arc Pro	B50	Sept 3, 2025	$349	BMG-G21	TSMC N5	19.6	272	16 Xe2-cores; 2048:128:64:16:128 (128:128:4)	1700; 2600	4 MB	87; 133	218; 332.8	GDDR6	16 GB	224	128-bit	14000	21.3	10.65	1.33	170	70 W	PCIe 5.0 x8
Arc Pro	B60	Q3 2025	$599	BMG-G21	TSMC N5	19.6	272	20 Xe2-cores; 2560:160:80:20:160 (160:160:5)	2400	16 MB	192	384	GDDR6	24 GB	456	192-bit	19000	24.5	12.8	1.54	197	120-200 W	PCIe 5.0 x8
Arc Pro	B70	Q1 2026	$949	BMG-G31	TSMC N5	?	?	32 Xe2-cores; 4096:256:128:32:256 (256:256:8)	2280; 2800	16 MB		583; 716.8	GDDR6	32 GB	608	256-bit	19000	45.8	22.94		367	230 W	PCIe 5.0 x16

== PowerVR based ==
Specifications of Intel PowerVR-based series
Graphics	Launch	PowerVR core	Market	Chipset	Code name	Device id.	Core render clock (MHz)	Pixel pipelines	Shader model (vertex/pixel)	API support			Memory bandwidth (GB/s)	DVMT (MB)	Hardware acceleration		
Graphics	Launch	PowerVR core	Market	Chipset	Code name	Device id.	Core render clock (MHz)	Pixel pipelines	Shader model (vertex/pixel)	Direct3D	OpenGL	OpenCL	Memory bandwidth (GB/s)	DVMT (MB)	MPEG-2	VC-1	AVC
GMA 500	2008	SGX535	CE	CE3100 Atom Z520	Canmore	2E5B	?	2	3.0	9.0c	2.0	—	4.2	256	Full	Full	Full
GMA 500	2009	SGX535	CE	Atom CE4100	Sodaville	2E5B	?	2	3.0	9.0c	2.0	—	4.2	256	Full	Full	Full
GMA 500	2009	SGX535	CE	Atom CE4110	Sodaville	2E5B	200	2	3.0	9.0c	2.0	—	4.2	256	Full	Full	Full
GMA 500	2009	SGX535	CE	Atom CE4130	Sodaville	2E5B	200	2	3.0	9.0c	2.0	—	4.2	256	Full	Full	Full
GMA 500	2009	SGX535	CE	Atom CE4150	Sodaville	2E5B	400	2	3.0	9.0c	2.0	—	4.2	256	Full	Full	Full
GMA 500	2009	SGX535	CE	Atom CE4170	Sodaville	2E5B	400	2	3.0	9.0c	2.0	—	4.2	256	Full	Full	Full
GMA 500	2010	SGX535	CE	Atom CE4200	Groveland	2E5B	?	2	3.0	9.0c	2.0	—	4.2	256	Full	Full	Full
GMA 500	2008	SGX535	MID	UL11L	Poulsbo (Menlow)	8108; 8109	100	2	3.0	9.0c	2.0	—	4.2	256	Full	Full	Full
GMA 500	2008	SGX535	MID	US15L	Poulsbo (Menlow)	8108; 8109	200	2	3.0	9.0c	2.0	—	4.2	256	Full	Full	Full
GMA 500	2008	SGX535	MID	US15W	Poulsbo (Menlow)	8108; 8109	200	2	3.0	9.0c	2.0	—	4.2	256	Full	Full	Full
GMA 600	2010	SGX535	MID	Atom Z6xx	Lincroft (Moorestown)	4102	400	2	3.0	9.0c	2.0	—	6.4	759	Full	Full	Full
GMA	2012	SGX540	Smartphone	Atom Z24xx	Penwell (Medfield)	?	400	4	—	—	ES 2.0	—	6.4	1024	Full	Full	Full
GMA 3600	2011	SGX545	Nettop; Netbook	Atom D2500; Atom N2600	Cedarview (Cedar Trail)	0BE0; 0BE1; 0BE2; 0BE3	400	4	3.0	9.0c	3.0	—	8.5; 6.4	1024	Full	Full	Full
GMA 3650	2011	SGX545	Nettop; Netbook	Atom D2700; Atom N2800	Cedarview (Cedar Trail)	0BE0; 0BE1; 0BE2; 0BE3	640	4	3.0	9.0c	3.0	—	8.5	1024	Full	Full	Full
GMA	2012	SGX545	Tablet	Atom Z2760	Cloverview (Clover Trail)	08C7; 08C8; 08C9; 08CA; 08CB; 08CC; 08CD; 08CE; 08CF	533	4	3.0	9.0c	2.0	—	6.4	2048	Full	Full	Full
GMA	2012	SGX544 MP2	Tablet	Atom Z2520; Atom Z2560; Atom Z2580	Cloverview (Clover Trail+)	?	300Mhz; 400 MHz; 533 MHz	?	?	9.0 L3	2.0ES, 2.0?	1.1	?	?	Full	Full	Full

== Larrabee based ==
Larrabee is the codename for a cancelled GPGPU chip that Intel was developing separately from its current line of integrated graphics accelerators. It is named after either Mount Larrabee or Larrabee State Park in the state of Washington. The chip was to be released in 2010 as the core of a consumer 3D graphics card, but these plans were cancelled due to delays and disappointing early performance figures. The project to produce a GPU retail product directly from the Larrabee research project was terminated in May 2010 and its technology was passed on to the Xeon Phi. The Intel MIC multiprocessor architecture announced in 2010 inherited many design elements from the Larrabee project, but does not function as a graphics processing unit; the product is intended as a co-processor for high performance computing.

== See also ==
- Comparison of Intel processors
- Intel Arc
- Intel Quick Sync Video
- Intel Larrabee GPU
- List of AMD graphics processing units
- List of Intel chipsets
- List of Intel processors
- List of Nvidia graphics processing units
- Xeon Phi

== Notes ==
Acronyms
The following acronyms are used throughout the article.

- EU: Execution Unit
- iDCT: Inverse discrete cosine transform
- iMDCT: Inverse modified discrete cosine transform
- LF: In-loop deblocking filter
- MC: Motion compensation
- VLD: Variable-length code (sometimes referred to as slice-level acceleration)
- WMV9: Windows Media Video 9 codec

Full hardware acceleration techniques
Intel graphic processing units employ the following techniques in hardware acceleration of digital video playback.

Codec used to encode the video	Technique employed
MPEG-2 Part 2	VLD, iDCT, and MC
VC-1	VLD, iMDCT, MC, and LF
H.264/MPEG-4 AVC	VLD, iMDCT, MC, and LF

Calculation
The raw performance of integrated GPU, in FLOPS, can be calculated as follows:

GPU	FLOPS		
GPU	FP16	FP32	FP64
Gen4 (GMA 3, 4)	-	(clock speed) * (# of FP32 ALUs)	-
Gen5 (HD Graphics)	-	(clock speed) * (# of FP32 ALUs)	-
Gen6 (HD Graphics 2000, 3000)	-	(clock speed) * 2 * (# of FP32 ALUs)	-
Gen7 (HD Graphics 2500, 4000 ~ 5200)	-	(clock speed) * 2 * (# of FP32 ALUs)	(clock speed) * (# of FP32 ALUs) / 2
Gen8 (HD Graphics 5300 ~ 6300)	(clock speed) * 2 * (# of FP32 ALUs) * 2	(clock speed) * 2 * (# of FP32 ALUs)	(clock speed) * (# of FP32 ALUs) / 2
Gen9 (HD Graphics 5xx, 6xx)	(clock speed) * 2 * (# of FP32 ALUs) * 2	(clock speed) * 2 * (# of FP32 ALUs)	(clock speed) * (# of FP32 ALUs) / 2
Gen11	(clock speed) * 2 * (# of FP32 ALUs) * 2	(clock speed) * 2 * (# of FP32 ALUs)	(clock speed) * (# of FP32 ALUs) / 2

For example, the HD Graphics 3000 is rated at 125 GFLOPS, which is consistent with the formula (12 * 4 * 2 * 1,300 MHz).
