= StreamMyGame =

- Type: Cloud gaming
- Released: 26 October 2007
- Media: Real Time Streaming Protocol
- Online services: via website
- Website: www.streammygame.com (defunct)

StreamMyGame was a software-only game streaming solution that enables Microsoft Windows-based games and applications to be played remotely on Windows and Linux devices. It was first released on 26 October 2007 as a Windows-only software.

The service is now defunct, with the official website shutting down sometime in 2017 according to the Internet Archive.

== History ==
On 14 January 2008, StreamMyGame launched a Linux version of its player. This new version made it possible to use a PlayStation 3 running Linux to remotely play Windows games.

On 3 June 2008, Sean Maloney, Intel Corporation Executive Vice President of Sales and Marketing demonstrated StreamMyGame at Computex 08 over a WiMAX connection using an Intel Mobile Internet device to view and play the game Crysis.

On 17 July 2008, StreamMyGame announced that its Player was compatible with Intel's Atom range of processors and devices including Asus's EeePC netbook. In addition to streaming games over a local network, StreamMyGame can be used over broadband networks however these broadband connections require a minimum upload speed of 2 Mbit/s.

== Architecture ==
Members of StreamMyGames website could download and install a Server and Player application. The Server had to be installed on the same computer on which the games are installed. The Server automatically searches the user's hard drive for known games and uploads links to these games onto the StreamMyGame website. The Server was compatible with Windows XP, Windows Vista and Windows 7. The Player was installed on the computer or device on which the game is to be played and was compatible with Windows XP, Windows Vista and Windows 7 along with Ubuntu, Fedora, Red Hat, Xandros, Debian and Yellow Dog Linux. Both Server and Player software required continuous internet access. In addition to streaming games, StreamMyGame enabled its members to record games to a video file that can be uploaded to sites such as YouTube.

== Use ==
After members selected a game they wanted to play on the StreamMyGame website, the website sent an encrypted message to the Server, and the Server starts the game and captured its video and audio. The captured video and audio was then sent to a Player via Real-Time Streaming Protocol and displayed. The Player captured keyboard and mouse commands and sent these back to the Server where they were used to control the game.

== Community ==
StreamMyGame enabled its members to interact via a bespoke Web 2.0 website that included messaging, chat, forums and groups. Members could use group permissions to enable other members to share the use of their games. StreamMyGame's forums were predominantly used by its members to publish performance details of StreamMyGame when used with new and existing games.

== See also ==
- List of cloud gaming solution providers
