= Media Capture API =

Web standard

- Developer: W3C Working Group
- Release: 2011
- Successor: Media Capture and Streams
- Website: https://www.w3.org/TR/media-capture-api/
- Repository: github.com/w3c/mediacapture-main

The Media Capture API is a web standard under development to allow web applications to access the media capture capabilities of a device (typically a Smartphone or other Mobile Internet device). This would allow a web application to include a function to record audio via the device's microphone, and take a picture or record a video with the device's camera.

The standard was discontinued by the World Wide Web Consortium in 2012, and is supported in the Android browser (from version 3.0+). The Media Capture API was replaced by The Media Capture and Streams API

The Media Capture and Streams API gives JavaScript tools for asking permission to use media devices like microphones and cameras and for dealing with the audio and video streams that come from those devices.

A MediaStream has one or more MediaStreamTrack objects that each show a media track, like audio or video. Streams can be shown using media elements, sent across a network, with WebRTC saved or changed using Web APIs.

== History ==
The original Media Capture API was designed by the W3C to enable web applications to access media capture features of devices. It offered the following proposed function: to take audio using microphones and photos/video using cameras. This specification was later dropped in 2012, and its work is ongoing in the Media Capture and Streams specification.
