= IdeaPad S series =

Line of laptops from Lenovo

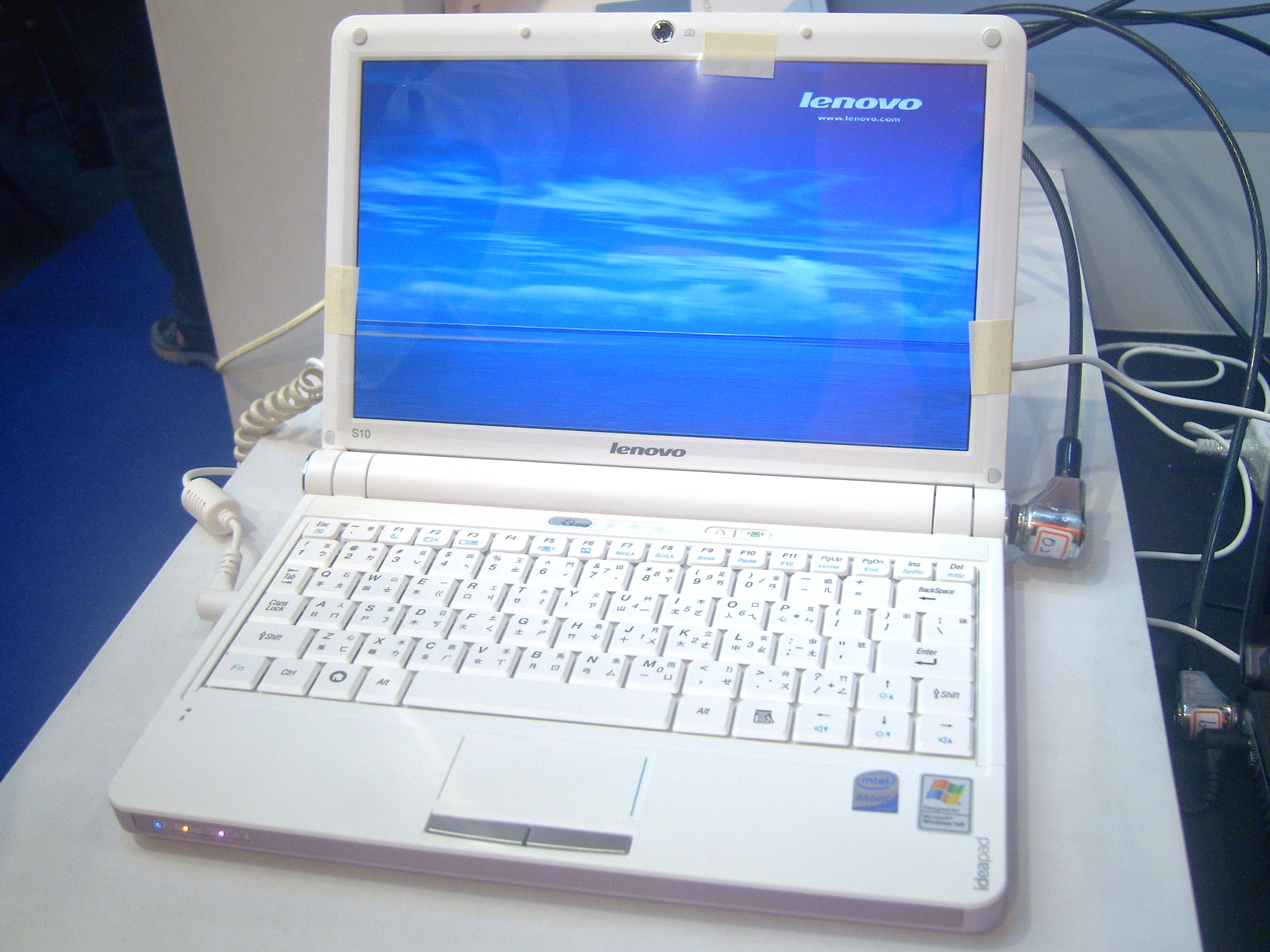
- Lenovo IdeaPad S10
- Developer: Lenovo
- Type: Netbook, low-cost Ultrabook
- Released: October 8, 2008
- Operating system: Windows; Lenovo Quick Start
- Display: 8.9–14 inches
- Input: Keyboard, touchpad, microphone, 1.3 megapixel webcam

The IdeaPad S Series is a series of notebook computers launched by Lenovo in October 2008. The IdeaPad S10 was initially scheduled for launch in September, but its release was delayed in the United States until October.

The S series began with the IdeaPad S10, the lowest cost model, powered by an Intel Atom processor in a 10.2-inch subnotebook. Later, more expensive laptops in the S-series also powered by Intel Atoms were released. Once the Atom CPU line was discontinued, the main line of lightweight S series laptops switched to alternatives, such as the low-power AMD A-series, Intel Celeron, Pentium, and low-cost versions of Y-series CPUs.

== 2008 ==
The IdeaPad S10, the first laptop in the IdeaPad S Series of netbooks, was released in 2008.

=== S10 ===
IdeaPad S10
- Type: Netbook
- Released: October 8, 2008
- Media: 80, 120, 160 GB 2.5" HDD
- Operating system: Windows XP; Lenovo Quick Start
- CPU: 1.6 GHz Intel Atom, single core Diamondville
- Memory: 512 MB/1 GB
- Display: 10.2" (25.9 cm) 1024×600 LED backlit TFT LCD
- Input: Keyboard, touchpad, microphone, 1.3 megapixel webcam
- Connectivity: 10/100 Mbit Ethernet; 802.11b/g wireless LAN; 2 USB 2.0 ports 4-in-1 flash memory card reader Bluetooth, except US before March 2009; Expresscard
- Power: 3-cell (2.5 hours) 28 Wh (2.6 Ah); 6-cell (5.5 hours) 56 Wh (5.2 Ah); 9-cell (7 hours) 84 Wh (7.8 Ah)
- Dimensions: 10.23 × 7.08 × 0.748 in
- Weight: 2.64 lb (1.2 kg) (3-cell battery)

The IdeaPad S10 was Lenovo's first netbook. While Engadget found the design unremarkable, the low starting price was well-received. The S10 featured a 10.2-inch (260 mm) TFT active matrix 1024×576 or 1024×600 display with an 80 or 160 GB hard disk drive and 512 MB or 1 GB DDR2 Random Access Memory, both of which could be upgraded via a trap door on the bottom of the netbook. The initial S10 featured 512 MB of RAM soldered to system board with an expansion SO-DIMM slot for further upgrades to 2 or 2.5 GB (2.5 GB was only usable with an operating system with support for sparse memory regions). The processor was an Intel Atom that ran at 1.6 GHz. The S10 supported IEEE 802.11 b/g wireless networking and had two USB ports, an ExpressCard expansion slot, a 4-in-1 media reader, and a VGA output. These computers received positive consumer reviews and a 9/10 rating from Wired magazine.

In May 2009 Lenovo introduced the S10-2. While the S10-2 shared many traits with the S10/S10e, it omitted the ExpressCard34 slot, featured a new physical design, added an additional USB port, and enlarged the keyboard, touchpad, and sizes of the hard drive and SSD.

== 2009 ==
The IdeaPad S Series netbooks released by Lenovo in 2009 were the S10e, S10-2, and the S12.

=== S10e ===
The IdeaPad S10e was a re-launch of the IdeaPad S10, with features updated for the education market. The netbook included a quick start operating system and 5 hours of battery life at a low starting price. It weighed 2.8 lbs, with a form factor of 9.8 x 7.7 x 0.9–1.4-inches. The netbook offered a wide keyboard occupying almost the entire width of the chassis, and LAPTOP Magazine reported that it was easy for even adults to type on.

=== S10-2 ===
The IdeaPad S10-2 was a 10-inch netbook with a 1.6 GHz Intel Atom processor, 1 GB RAM, a 6-cell battery, and Intel GMA Integrated Graphics. Notebook Review reported that the netbook's design offered "a cleaner and smoother appearance all around". The specifications of the netbook are as follows:

- Processor: Intel Atom N270 1.6 GHz or Intel Atom N280 1.66 GHz and Hyper-Threading
- RAM: 1 GB DDR2 667 MHz
- Display: 10.1" (WSVGA, Glossy, LED-backlit, 1024x600)
- Storage: 160 GB 5400 rpm
- Graphics: Intel GMA 950 Integrated
- Wi-Fi: Broadcom 802.11b/g
- Card reader: 4-in-1
- Dimensions: 10.2 x 7.6 x 0.7-1.8 (inches)
- Operating system: Windows XP Home Edition (SP3)

=== S12 ===
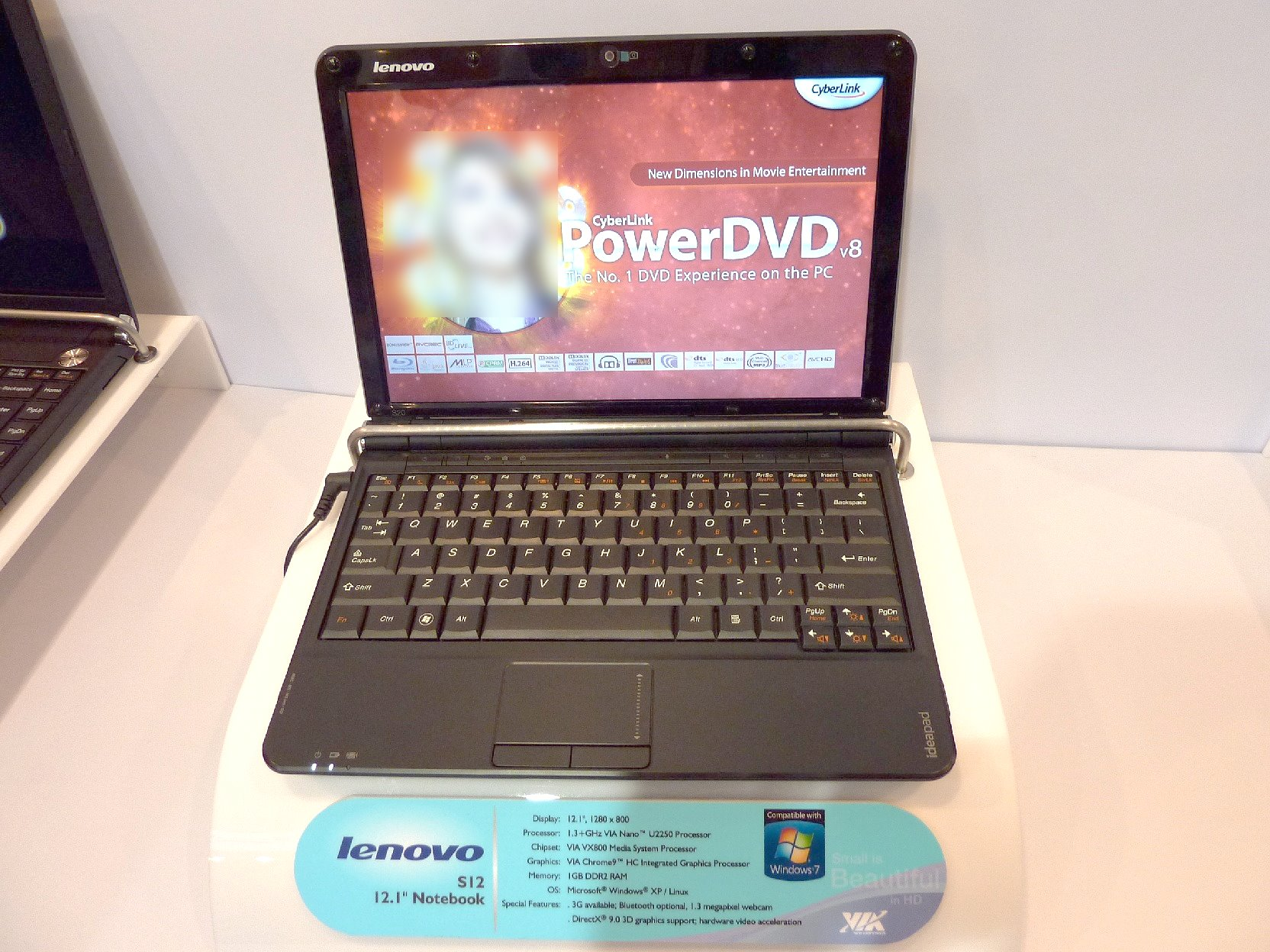
The Nvidia Ion version of IdeaPad S12

The IdeaPad S12 received a fairly positive review from PCMagazine. Its features that were well-received included the 12 inch widescreen with a 1280×800 resolution, keyboard, express card slot, and battery life. However, the netbook's price and weight were poorly received by the reviewers. The specifications of the netbook are as follows:

- Processor: Intel Atom N270 1.6 GHz
- RAM: 1 GB (up to 3 GB) DDR2-667
- Storage: 160 GB 5400 rpm SATA
- Display: 12.1 inches (1280×800)
- Graphics: Intel GMA 950
- Wi-Fi: 802.11b/g
- Dimensions: 11.5 in × 9.0 in × 1.4 in
- Weight: 3.4 lb (1.5 kg)
- Operating system: MS Windows XP Home

== 2010 ==
The IdeaPad netbooks released in 2010 were the S10-3, S10-3t, and S10-3s.

=== S10-3 ===
The IdeaPad S10-3 netbook was praised for its full-size keyboard, design, light chassis, and low price. It was criticized for its navigation experience, touchpad, low capacity hard drive, and the lack of options for customization. Michael Prospero from LAPTOP Magazine indicated in his review that Lenovo had addressed some of the issues raised about the S10-2 netbook and praised the keyboard and the design. He also indicated that the storage capacity was not on par with competitor offerings and that the touchpad could have been improved.

=== S10-3t ===
The IdeaPad S10-3t was a netbook that was also a convertible tablet. The S10-3t netbook was among the first computers to use the 1.83 GHz Intel Atom N470 processor. The software BumpTop was preloaded and offered a desk-like view of the desktop in 3D for ease of use.

=== S10-3s ===
The IdeaPad S10-3s was roughly an inch narrower than the S10-2, with a form factor of 10.6 x 6.6 x 1.4 inches. The netbook was also slightly lighter than similar netbooks and weighed 2.6 lbs. The netbook offered the following specifications:

- Processor: Intel Atom N450 1.66 GHz
- RAM: 1 GB DDR2
- Graphics: Intel GMA 3150
- Storage: 160 GB 5400RPM SATA
- Display: 10.1" (maximum resolution of 1024x600)

== 2011 ==
The IdeaPad S Series netbooks released in 2011 were the S205 and the S215.

=== S205 ===
The S205 had an AMD Fusion E350 dual core processor, 11.6" widescreen display with a 16:9 aspect ratio, and ATI Mobility Radeon 6310M graphics. The specifications of the S205 are as follows:

- Processor: Up to 1.60 GHz AMD Dual-Core E-350
- RAM: Up to 4 GB DDR3 1066 MHz
- Graphics: Up to AMD Radeon HD 6310M (512 MB graphics memory)
- Dimensions (mm): 290 x 18~26.3 x 193
- Weight: starting at 1.35 kg

=== S215 ===
The Lenovo IdeaPad S215 contained 500 GB, 5,400 RPM traditional HDD and 8 GB of solid-state storage.

== 2012 ==
=== S300 ===
Detailed specifications of the netbooks are as follows:

- Processor: several (ie: Celeron 887)
- RAM: 4 GB
- Storage: SATA 500 GB HDD
- Display: 14"
- Graphics: Intel GMA HD
- Operating system: MS Windows 7
