= Silvermont =

Microarchitecture from Intel

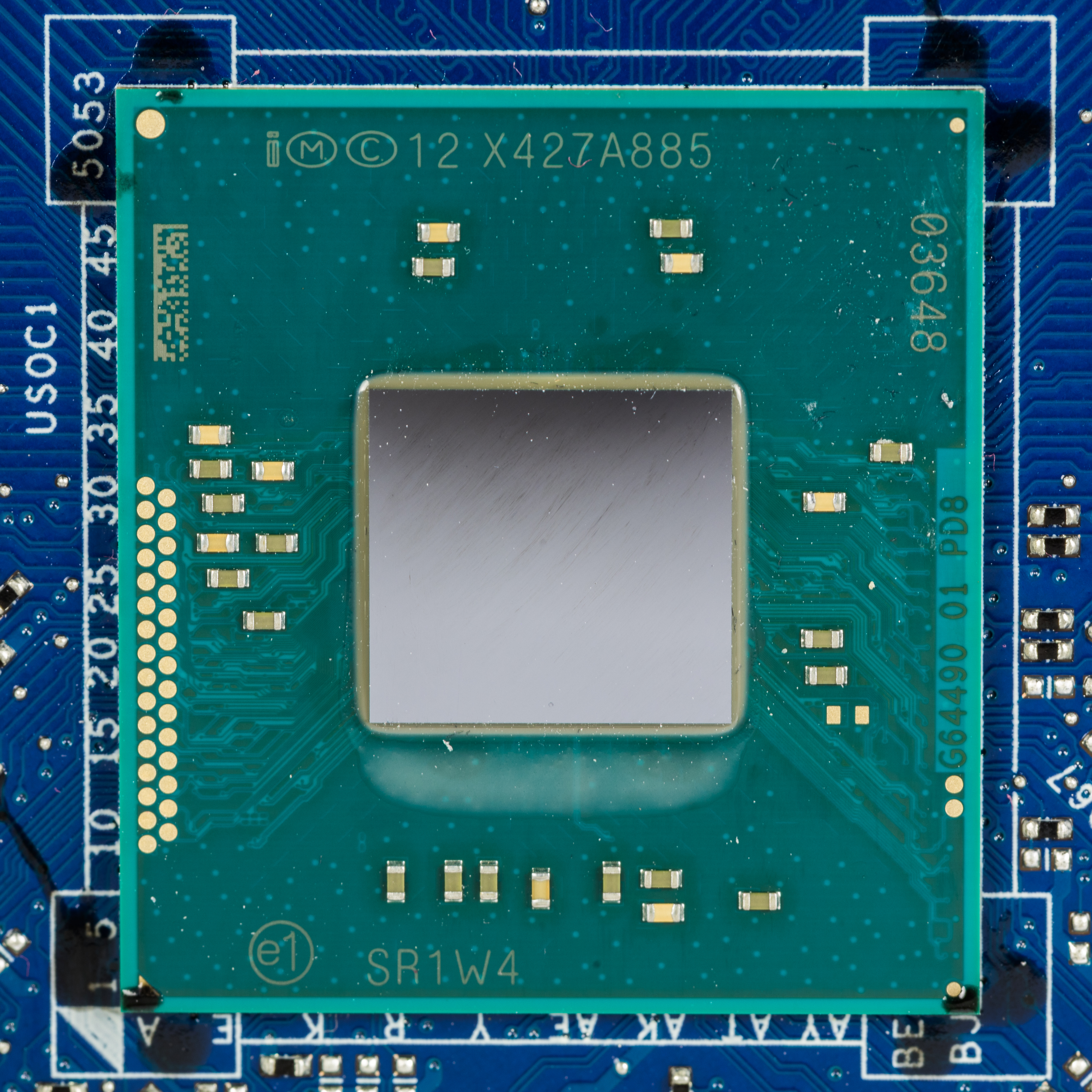
- Intel Mobile Celeron N2830

General information
- Launched: From 2013
- Common manufacturer: Intel

Physical specifications
- Cores: 2–8

Architecture and classification
- Technology node: 22 nm
- Instructions: x86-16, IA-32, x86-64
- Extensions: MMX, SSE, SSE2, SSE3, SSSE3, SSE4, SSE4.1, SSE4.2; AES-NI, RDRAND, CLMUL; VT-x

Products, models, variants
- Brand names: Atom; Celeron; Pentium

History
- Predecessors: Bonnell; Saltwell
- Successors: Airmont (die shrink), Goldmont (new microarchitecture)

Silvermont is a microarchitecture for low-power Atom, Celeron and Pentium branded processors used in systems on a chip (SoCs) made by Intel. Silvermont forms the basis for a total of four SoC families:

- Merrifield and Moorefield – consumer SoCs intended for smartphones
- Bay Trail – consumer SoCs aimed at tablets, hybrid devices, netbooks, nettops, and embedded/automotive systems
- Avoton – SoCs for micro-servers and storage devices
- Rangeley – SoCs targeting network and communication infrastructure.

Silvermont is the successor of the Bonnell, using a newer 22 nm process (previously introduced with Ivy Bridge) and a new microarchitecture, replacing Hyper Threading with out-of-order execution.

Silvermont was announced to news media on May 6, 2013, at Intel's headquarters at Santa Clara, California. Intel had repeatedly said the first Bay Trail devices would be available during the Holiday 2013 timeframe, while leaked slides showed that the release window for Bay Trail-T as August 28 – September 13, 2013. Both Avoton and Rangeley were announced as being available in the second half of 2013. The first Merrifield devices were announced in 1H14.

According to the Tick–tock model Airmont is the 14 nm die shrink of Silvermont, launched in early 2015 and first seen in the Atom x7-Z8700 as used in the Microsoft Surface 3. Airmont microarchitecture includes the following SoC families:

- Braswell – consumer SoCs aimed at PCs
- Cherry Trail – consumer SoCs aimed at tablets.

Silvermont based cores have also been used, modified, in the Knight's Landing iteration of Intel's Xeon Phi HPC chips.

== Design ==
Silvermont was the first Atom processor to feature an out-of-order architecture.

== Technology ==
- A 22 nm manufacturing process based on 3D tri-gate transistors
- System on chip architecture
- Consumer chips up to quad-core, business-class chips up to eight cores
- Supports SSE4.2 instruction set
- Gen 7 Intel HD Graphics with DirectX 11, OpenGL 4.0, and OpenCL 1.1 support. OpenGL 4.0 is supported with 10.18.10.5161 WHQL and later drivers. On Android, Silvermont graphics is OpenGL ES 3.1 certified.
- 10 W TDP desktop processors
- 4.5 and 7.5 W TDP mobile processors
- 20 W TDP Server and Communications processors

== Errata ==
Intel revealed in its Q4 2016 quarterly report that there were quality issues in the C2000 product family, which had an effect on the financial performance of the company's Data Center Group that quarter. An erratum named AVR54 published by Intel; state there is a defect in the chip's LPC clock, and affected systems "may experience inability to boot or may cease operation". A workaround is available requiring platform hardware changes. The SoC failures are thought to have led to failures in Cisco and Synology products, though discussion of the C2000 as the root cause of failure has been reported to be under a non-disclosure agreement for many vendors.

Intel released a new C0 stepping of the C2000 series in April 2017 which corrected the bug.

In July 2017 Intel published that a similar quality issue affects also Atom E3800 series embedded processors. The erratum named VLI89 published by Intel state, similar to issue with Atom C2000, that there is a defect in the chip's LPC clock and affected systems "may experience inability to boot or may cease operation". Issues extend also to USB bus and SD card circuitry and should happen "under certain conditions where activity is high for several years". In April 2018 Intel announced it is releasing a new D1 stepping to fix the issue.

The LPC, USB and SD Card buses circuitry degradation issues also apply to other Bay Trail processors such as Intel Celeron J1900 and N2800/N2900 series; also to Pentium N3500, J2850, J2900 series; and Celeron J1800 and J1750 series—as those are based on the same affected silicon.

Cisco stated failures of Atom C2000 processors can occur as early as 18 months of use with higher failure rates occurring after 36 months.

Mitigations were found to limit impact on systems. Firmware update for the LPC bus called LPC_CLKRUN# reduces the utilization of the LPC interface what in turn decreases (but not eliminates) LPC bus degradation - some systems are however not compatible with this new firmware. USB should have a maximum of 10% active time and there is a 50TB transmit traffic life expectancy over the lifetime of the port. It is recommended not to use SD card as a boot device and to remove the card from the system when not in use.

=== Bay Trail issues on Linux ===
It has been widely reported that Bay Trail CPUs (and possibly their derivatives including Airmont/Braswell/Cherry Trail) experience random freezes / lock-ups on various Linux kernels. Reference Linux bug report 109051 on Kernel.org Bugzilla, first reported Dec-2015. Workaround seems to be setting the Linux kernel flag intel_idle.max_cstate=1, which while eliminating the system freezes/lock-ups, results in increased CPU power/battery usage by preventing the CPU from entering higher power-saving C-states. Systems running Windows-OSes apparently do not experience these lockup/freeze issues. The issue had been addressed in the commit "drm/i915: Disable preemption and sleeping while using the punit sideband".

=== Bay Trail issues on FreeBSD ===
A potential fix is to set hw.acpi.cpu.cx_lowest=C1 and dev.cpu.<n>.lowest via /etc/sysctl.conf.

=== Airmont issues ===
14 nm Airmont architecture processors are also affected by the design flaws as noted in the Braswell Specification Update under CHP49 errata. In addition to LPC and SD Card circuitry degradation issues those 14 nm designs also have issues with Real Time Clock (RTC) circuitry degradation, their USB buses are however not affected. Unspecified firmware changes are required to mitigate RTC circuitry degradation. Intel does not plan to release a new stepping for Braswell. Intel admitted the issue stating the impact on consumers depends on use condition.

== List of Silvermont processors ==
=== Desktop processors (Bay Trail-D) ===
List of desktop processors as follows:

Target segment	Cores (threads)	Processor branding and model		GPU model	TDP	Turbo (GHz)	GPU freq. (MHz)		L2 cache (MB)	Release date	Price (USD)
Target segment	Cores (threads)	Processor branding and model		GPU model	TDP	1-core	Base	Turbo	L2 cache (MB)	Release date	Price (USD)
Value	4 (4)	Pentium	J2900	HD Graphics (4 EU)	10 W / 2.41 GHz	2.67	688	896	2	Q4 2013	$94
Value	4 (4)	Pentium	J2850	HD Graphics (4 EU)	10 W / 2.41 GHz	—N/a	688	792	2	Q3 2013	$94
Value	4 (4)	Celeron	J1900	HD Graphics (4 EU)	10 W / 2.0 GHz	2.42	688	854	2	Q4 2013	$82
Value	4 (4)	Celeron	J1850	HD Graphics (4 EU)	10 W / 2.0 GHz	—N/a	688	792	2	Q3 2013	$82
Value	2 (2)	Celeron	J1800	HD Graphics (4 EU)	10 W / 2.41 GHz	2.58	688	792	1	Q4 2013	$72
Value	2 (2)	Celeron	J1750	HD Graphics (4 EU)	10 W / 2.41 GHz	—N/a	688	750	1	Q3 2013	$72

=== Server processors (Avoton) ===
It has been found that a bug in the blueprint of the C2000 CPUs family may cause failure of its embedded Ethernet ports.

List of server processors as follows:

Target segment	Cores (threads)	Processor branding and model		GPU model	TDP	CPU Turbo (GHz)	Graphics clock rate		L2 cache (MB)	Release date	Price (USD)
Target segment	Cores (threads)	Processor branding and model		GPU model	TDP	1-core	Normal	Turbo	L2 cache (MB)	Release date	Price (USD)
Server	8 (8)	Atom	C2750	—N/a	20 W / 2.4 GHz	2.6	—N/a	—N/a	4	Q3 2013	$171
Server	8 (8)	Atom	C2730	—N/a	12 W / 1.7 GHz	2.0	—N/a	—N/a	4	Q3 2013	$150
Server	4 (4)	Atom	C2550	—N/a	14 W / 2.4 GHz	2.6	—N/a	—N/a	2	Q3 2013	$86
Server	4 (4)	Atom	C2530	—N/a	9 W / 1.7 GHz	2.0	—N/a	—N/a	2	Q3 2013	$70
Server	2 (2)	Atom	C2350	—N/a	6 W / 1.7 GHz	2.0	—N/a	—N/a	1	Q3 2013	$43

=== Communications processors (Rangeley) ===
List of communications processors as follows:

Target segment	Cores (threads)	Processor branding and model		GPU model	TDP	CPU Turbo (GHz)	GPU freq.		Intel QuickAssist	L2 cache (MB)	Release date	Price (USD)
Target segment	Cores (threads)	Processor branding and model		GPU model	TDP	1-core	Normal	Turbo	Intel QuickAssist	L2 cache (MB)	Release date	Price (USD)
Communications	8 (8)	Atom	C2758	—N/a	20 W / 2.4 GHz	—N/a	—N/a	—N/a	Yes	4	Q3 2013	$208
Communications	8 (8)	Atom	C2738	—N/a	20 W / 2.4 GHz	—N/a	—N/a	—N/a	No	4	Q3 2013	$208
Communications	8 (8)	Atom	C2718	—N/a	18 W / 2.0 GHz	—N/a	—N/a	—N/a	Yes	4	Q3 2013	$182
Communications	4 (4)	Atom	C2558	—N/a	15 W / 2.4 GHz	—N/a	—N/a	—N/a	Yes	2	Q3 2013	$104
Communications	4 (4)	Atom	C2538	—N/a	15 W / 2.4 GHz	—N/a	—N/a	—N/a	No	2	Q3 2013	$104
Communications	4 (4)	Atom	C2518	—N/a	13 W / 1.7 GHz	—N/a	—N/a	—N/a	Yes	2	Q3 2013	$91
Communications	4 (4)	Atom	C2508	—N/a	9.5 W / 1.25 GHz	—N/a	—N/a	—N/a	Yes	2	Q2 2014	$98
Communications	2 (2)	Atom	C2358	—N/a	7 W / 1.7 GHz	2.0	—N/a	—N/a	Yes	1	Q3 2013	$60
Communications	2 (2)	Atom	C2338	—N/a	7 W / 1.7 GHz	2.0	—N/a	—N/a	No	1	Q3 2013	$60
Communications	2 (2)	Atom	C2308	—N/a	6 W / 1.25 GHz	—N/a	—N/a	—N/a	Yes	1	Q2 2014	$60

=== Embedded/automotive processors (Bay Trail-I) ===
List of embedded processors as follows:

Target segment	Cores (threads)	Processor branding and model		GPU model	TDP	CPU Turbo	GPU freq. (MHz)		L2 cache	Release date	Price (USD)
Target segment	Cores (threads)	Processor branding and model		GPU model	TDP	1-core	Base	Turbo	L2 cache	Release date	Price (USD)
Embedded	4 (4)	Atom	E3845	HD Graphics (4 EU)	10 W / 1.91 GHz	—N/a	542	792	2 MB	Q4 2013	$52
Embedded	2 (2)	Atom	E3827	HD Graphics (4 EU)	8 W / 1.75 GHz	—N/a	542	792	1 MB	Q4 2013	$41
Embedded	2 (2)	Atom	E3826	HD Graphics (4 EU)	7 W / 1.46 GHz	—N/a	533	677	1 MB	Q4 2013	$37
Embedded	2 (2)	Atom	E3825	HD Graphics (4 EU)	6 W / 1.33 GHz	—N/a	533	—N/a	1 MB	Q4 2013	$34
Embedded	1 (1)	Atom	E3815	HD Graphics (4 EU)	5 W / 1.46 GHz	—N/a	400	—N/a	512 KB	Q4 2013	$31
Embedded	2 (2)	Atom	E3805	—N/a	3 W / 1.33 GHz	—N/a	—N/a	—N/a	1 MB	Q4 2014	$31

=== Mobile processors (Bay Trail-M) ===
List of mobile processors as follows:

Target segment	Cores (threads)	Processor branding & model		GPU model	TDP	CPU turbo (GHz)	GPU freq. (MHz)		L2 cache (MB)	Release date	Price (USD)
Target segment	Cores (threads)	Processor branding & model		GPU model	TDP	CPU turbo (GHz)	Base	Turbo	L2 cache (MB)	Release date	Price (USD)
Value	4 (4)	Pentium	N3540	Intel HD Graphics (4 EU)	7.5 W / 2.16 GHz	2.66	313	896	2	2014-07-20	$161
Value	4 (4)	Pentium	N3530	Intel HD Graphics (4 EU)	7.5 W / 2.16 GHz	2.58	313	896	2	2014-02-23	$161
Value	4 (4)	Pentium	N3520	Intel HD Graphics (4 EU)	7.5 W / 2.166 GHz	2.42	313	854	2	2013-11-03	$161
Value	4 (4)	Pentium	N3510	Intel HD Graphics (4 EU)	7.5 W / 2.0 GHz	—N/a	313	750	2	2013-09-11	$161
Value	4 (4)	Celeron	N2940	Intel HD Graphics (4 EU)	7.5 W / 1.83 GHz	2.25	313	854	2	Q3 2014	$107
Value	4 (4)	Celeron	N2930	Intel HD Graphics (4 EU)	7.5 W / 1.83 GHz	2.16	313	854	2	2014-02-23	$107
Value	4 (4)	Celeron	N2920	Intel HD Graphics (4 EU)	7.5 W / 1.86 GHz	2.0	313	844	2	2013-11-03	$107
Value	4 (4)	Celeron	N2910	Intel HD Graphics (4 EU)	7.5 W / 1.6 GHz	—N/a	313	756	2	2013-09-11	$107
Value	2 (2)	Celeron	N2840	Intel HD Graphics (4 EU)	7.5 W / 2.16 GHz	2.58	311	792	1	Q3 2014	$107
Value	2 (2)	Celeron	N2830	Intel HD Graphics (4 EU)	7.5 W / 2.16 GHz	2.41	313	750	1	2014-02-23	$107
Value	2 (2)	Celeron	N2820	Intel HD Graphics (4 EU)	7.5 W / 2.13 GHz	2.39	313	756	1	2013-11-03	$107
Value	2 (2)	Celeron	N2815	Intel HD Graphics (4 EU)	7.5 W / 1.86 GHz	2.13	313	756	1	2013-11-03	$107
Value	2 (2)	Celeron	N2810	Intel HD Graphics (4 EU)	7.5 W / 2.0 GHz	—N/a	313	756	1	2013-09-11	$107
Value	2 (2)	Celeron	N2808	Intel HD Graphics (4 EU)	4.5 W / 1.58 GHz	2.25	311	792	1	Q3 2014	$107
Value	2 (2)	Celeron	N2807	Intel HD Graphics (4 EU)	4.3 W / 1.58 GHz	2.16	313	750	1	2014-02-23	$107
Value	2 (2)	Celeron	N2806	Intel HD Graphics (4 EU)	4.5 W / 1.6 GHz	2.0	313	756	1	2013-11-03	$107
Value	2 (2)	Celeron	N2805	Intel HD Graphics (4 EU)	4.3 W / 1.46 GHz	—N/a	313	667	1	2013-09-11	$107

=== Tablet processors (Bay Trail-T) ===
List of tablet and hybrid processors as follows:

Target segment	Cores (threads)	Processor branding & model		SDP(W)	CPU freq. (GHz)		L2 cache (MB)	GPU model	GPU freq. (MHz)		Memory					Max display resolution	Socket	Release date	Price (USD)
Target segment	Cores (threads)	Processor branding & model		SDP(W)	Base	Turbo	L2 cache (MB)	GPU model	Base	Burst	Type	# channels	Max speed	Max bandwidth	Max supported	Max display resolution	Socket	Release date	Price (USD)
Value	4 (4)	Atom	Z3795	2	1.66	2.39	2	HD Graphics (4 EU)	311	778	LPDDR3	2x64b	1067MT/s	17.1 GB/s	4 GB		FCBGA1380	Q1 2014	$40.00
Value	4 (4)	Atom	Z3785	2.2	1.49	2.41	2	HD Graphics (4 EU)	313	833	LPDDR3	2x64b	1333MT/s	21.3 GB/s	4 GB		FCBGA1380	Q2 2014	
Value	4 (4)	Atom	Z3775	2	1.46	2.39	2	HD Graphics (4 EU)	311	778	LPDDR3	2x64b	1067MT/s	17.1 GB/s	4 GB		FCBGA1380	Q1 2014	$35.00
Value	4 (4)	Atom	Z3775D	2.2	1.49	2.41	2	HD Graphics (4 EU)	311	792	DDR3L-RS	1x64b	1333MT/s	10.6 GB/s	4 GB		FCBGA1380	Q1 2014	$35.00
Value	4 (4)	Atom	Z3770	2	1.46	2.39	2	HD Graphics (4 EU)	311	667	LPDDR3	2x64b	1067MT/s	17.1 GB/s	4 GB	2560×1600	FCBGA1380	11 September 2013	$37.00
Value	4 (4)	Atom	Z3770D	2.2	1.5	2.41	2	HD Graphics (4 EU)	313	688	DDR3L-RS	1x64b	1333MT/s	10.6 GB/s	2 GB	1920×1280	FCBGA1380	11 September 2013	$37.00
Value	4 (4)	Atom	Z3740	2	1.33	1.86	2	HD Graphics (4 EU)	311	667	LPDDR3	2x64b	1067MT/s	17.1 GB/s	4 GB	2560×1600	FCBGA1380	11 September 2013	$32.00
Value	4 (4)	Atom	Z3740D	2.2	1.33	1.83	2	HD Graphics (4 EU)	313	688	DDR3L-RS	1x64b	1333MT/s	10.6 GB/s	2 GB	1920×1280	FCBGA1380	11 September 2013	$32.00
Value	4 (4)	Atom	Z3735F	2.2	1.33	1.83	2	HD Graphics (4 EU)	311	646	DDR3L-RS	1x64b	1333MT/s	10.6 GB/s	2 GB	1920×1200	FCBGA592	Q1 2014	$17.00
Value	4 (4)	Atom	Z3735G	2.2	1.33	1.83	2	HD Graphics (4 EU)	311	646	DDR3L-RS	1x32b	1333MT/s	5.3 GB/s	1 GB	1200×800	FCBGA592	Q1 2014	$17.00
Value	2 (2)	Atom	Z3680		1.33	2.0	1	HD Graphics (4 EU)	311	667	LPDDR3	1x64b	1067MT/s	8.5 GB/s	1 GB	1280×800		11 September 2013	—N/a
Value	2 (2)	Atom	Z3680D		1.33	2.0	1	HD Graphics (4 EU)	311	688	DDR3L-RS	1x64b	1333MT/s	10.6 GB/s	2 GB	1920×1280		11 September 2013	—N/a

=== Smartphone processors (Merrifield) ===
List of smartphone processors as follows:

Model	sSpec number	Cores	Clock rate	GPU frequency	L2 cache	I/O bus	Memory	Voltage	TDP	Socket	Release date	Part number(s)	Release price (USD)
Atom Z3460	SR1WR (B1); SR20G (B1); SR20U (B1)	2	1.6 GHz	400–457 MHz	1 MB		2 × LPDDR3-1066				March 2014	FG8065201850100	
Atom Z3480	SR1WS (B1); SR20F (B1)	2	2.13 GHz	457–533 MHz	1 MB		2 × LPDDR3-1066				March 2014	FG8065201850200	

=== Smartphone processors (Moorefield) ===
List of smartphone processors as follows:

Model	sSpec number	Cores	Clock rate	GPU frequency	L2 cache	I/O bus	Memory	Voltage	TDP	Socket	Release date	Part number(s)	Release price (USD)
Atom Z3530	SR1YR (B0)	4	1.33 GHz	457 MHz	2 × 1 MB		2 × LPDDR3-1600				H2 2014	GA8066301896101	
Atom Z3560	SR1WW (B0); SR1WX (B0)	4	1.83 GHz	457–533 MHz	2 × 1 MB		2 × LPDDR3-1600				H2 2014	GA8066301600200	
Atom Z3570		4	2.00 GHz	457–640 MHz	2 × 1 MB		2 × LPDDR3-1600				Q4 2014		
Atom Z3580	SR1WU (B0); SR1WV (B0)	4	2.33 GHz	457–533 MHz	2 × 1 MB		2 × LPDDR3-1600				H2 2014	GA8066301600100	
Atom Z3590		4	2.50 GHz	457–640 MHz	2 × 1 MB		2 × LPDDR3-1600				H2 2015		

== List of Airmont processors ==
=== Desktop processors (Braswell) ===
List of desktop processors as follows:

Target segment	Cores (threads)	Processor branding and model		GPU model		TDP	Turbo (GHz)	GPU freq. (MHz)		L2 cache (MB)	Release date	Price (USD)
Target segment	Cores (threads)	Processor branding and model		Brand name & model number	EU	TDP	1-core	Base	Turbo	L2 cache (MB)	Release date	Price (USD)
Desktop	4 (4)	Pentium	J3710	HD Graphics 405	18	6.5 W / 1.6 GHz	2.64	400	740	2	January; 2016	N/A
Desktop	4 (4)	Celeron	J3160	HD Graphics 400	12	6 W / 1.6 GHz	2.24	320	700	2	January; 2016	N/A
Desktop	2 (2)	Celeron	J3060	HD Graphics 400	12	6 W / 1.6 GHz	2.48	320	700	2 (Note: Some initial reports stated that the processor has 1 MB L2 cache; see Anthony Shvets. "Notes below Specifications". CPU World.)	January; 2016	N/A

=== Mobile processors (Braswell) ===
List of mobile processors as follows:

Target segment	Cores (threads)	Processor branding and model		GPU Model		TDP	Turbo (GHz)	GPU freq. (MHz)		L2 cache (MB)	Release date	Price (USD)
Target segment	Cores (threads)	Processor branding and model		Brand name & model number	EU	TDP	1-core	Base	Turbo	L2 cache (MB)	Release date	Price (USD)
Mobile	4 (4)	Pentium	N3710	HD Graphics 405	16	6W / 1.6 GHz	2.56	400	700	2	Q1 2016	$161
Mobile	4 (4)	Pentium	N3700	HD Graphics (Braswell)	16	6W / 1.6 GHz	2.4	400	700	2	Q1 2015	$161
Mobile	4 (4)	Celeron	N3160	HD Graphics 400	12	6W / 1.6 GHz	2.24	320	640	2	Q1 2016	$107
Mobile	4 (4)	Celeron	N3150	HD Graphics (Braswell)	12	6W / 1.6 GHz	2.08	320	640	2	Q1 2015	$107
Mobile	2 (2)	Celeron	N3060	HD Graphics 400	12	6W / 1.6 GHz	2.48	320	600	2	Q1 2016	$107
Mobile	2 (2)	Celeron	N3050	HD Graphics (Braswell)	12	6W / 1.6 GHz	2.16	320	600	2	Q1 2015	$107
Mobile	2 (2)	Celeron	N3010	HD Graphics 400	12	4W / 1.04 GHz	2.24	320	600	2	Q1 2016	$107
Mobile	2 (2)	Celeron	N3000	HD Graphics (Braswell)	12	4W / 1.04 GHz	2.08	320	600	2	Q1 2015	$107

=== Tablet processors (Cherry Trail) ===
List of smartphone and tablet processors as follows:

Target segment	Cores (threads)	Processor branding and model		SDP (W)	L2 cache (MB)	CPU freq. (GHz)		GPU				Socket	Release date	Price (USD)
Target segment	Cores (threads)	Processor branding and model		SDP (W)	L2 cache (MB)	CPU freq. (GHz)		Brand name	EU	Freq. (MHz)		Socket	Release date	Price (USD)
Target segment	Cores (threads)	Processor branding and model		SDP (W)	L2 cache (MB)	Base	Turbo 1-core	Brand name	EU	Base	Turbo	Socket	Release date	Price (USD)
Tablet	4 (4)	Atom x7	Z8750	2	2	1.6	2.56	HD Graphics	16	200	600	FCBGA1380	Q1 2016	$37
Tablet	4 (4)	Atom x7	Z8700	2	2	1.6	2.4	HD Graphics	16	200	600	FCBGA1380	Q1 2015	$37
Tablet	4 (4)	Atom x5	Z8550	2	2	1.44	2.4	HD Graphics	12	200	600	FCBGA1380	Q1 2015	$27
Tablet	4 (4)	Atom x5	Z8500	2	2	1.44	2.24	HD Graphics	12	200	600	FCBGA1380	Q1 2015	$27
Tablet	4 (4)	Atom x5	Z8350	2	2	1.44	1.92	HD Graphics	12	200	500	FCBGA594	Q1 2016	$21
Tablet	4 (4)	Atom x5	Z8330	2	2	1.44	1.92	HD Graphics	12	200	500	FCBGA594	Q1 2016	
Tablet	4 (4)	Atom x5	Z8300	2	2	1.44	1.84	HD Graphics	12	200	500	FCBGA594	Q2 2015	$21

== Other uses ==
Silvermont based processor cores have been used in Knights Landing versions of Intel's Xeon Phi multiprocessor HPC chips, with changes for HPC including AVX-512 vector units.

Intel also licensed Airmont CPU cores to Spreadtrum (now UNISOC) for use with two of its SoCs launched in 2017: SC9861G-IA and SC9853l.

== See also ==
- List of Intel CPU microarchitectures
- List of Intel Pentium microprocessors
- List of Intel Celeron microprocessors
- List of Intel Atom microprocessors
- Atom (system on chip)
