= System Controller Hub =

Intel microchip family

System Controller Hub (SCH) is a family of Intel microchips employed in chipsets for low-power Atom-based platforms. Its architecture is consistent with the Intel Hub Architecture but combines the traditional northbridge and southbridge functions into a single microchip.

== Poulsbo ==
Poulsbo is the codename of the first SCH and plays a key role in Intel's second-generation Menlow UMPC and MID platform chipset for Atom Silverthorne microprocessors.

The graphics core is called GMA 500 and unlike most graphics cores used by Intel was developed by Imagination Technologies. Intel licensed the PowerVR SGX 535 as a graphics core and the PowerVR VXD370 for H.264/MPEG-4 AVC playback. The video core is able to process 720p as well as 1080i resolutions.

This has the following variations:

- SCH UL11L
- SCH US15L
- SCH US15W
- SCH US15WP
- SCH US15WPT
- SCH US15X

=== GMA 500 Linux support ===
Although several netbooks using the Poulsbo chipset are shipped with some distribution of Linux (notably the Sony Vaio P and Dell Inspiron Mini 12, among others), Poulsbo's graphics core GMA 500 is currently not well supported by Intel for Linux.

A proprietary driver was shipped with Dell's adaptation of Ubuntu 8.04.1 Netbook Remix, which provides 2D hardware acceleration (although users reported serious stability issues) under Linux kernel 2.6.24. A work-in-progress free driver is currently available, however the proprietary driver does not work with current Linux kernels and current versions of X. Work is under way to provide at least 2D support in current Linux kernels, although this will still rely on proprietary binary code for the 3D part of the driver. The current status of this driver runs on Fedora 10 and allows for 2D. 3D acceleration, however, is still broken.

A working, proprietary driver package is available for Fedora 11.

Starting with Mandriva 2010 Release Candidate 2, Poulsbo drivers are now fully supported out of the box when you use One isos. Hardware will be automatically detected and configured using XFdrake. As it needs non-free firmware, this could not be included in Free isos.

A rudimentary (no 3D acceleration) driver was added to Linux 2.6.39.

== Whitmore Lake ==
Whitmore Lake is the codename of another SCH.

This has the following variations:

- 3100 SCH

== See also ==
- Platform Controller Hub (PCH)
- I/O Controller Hub (ICH)
- PCI IDE ISA Xcelerator (PIIX)
- Intel GMA
- List of Intel codenames
