= Mobile Internet device =

Multimedia capable mobile device providing wireless Internet access

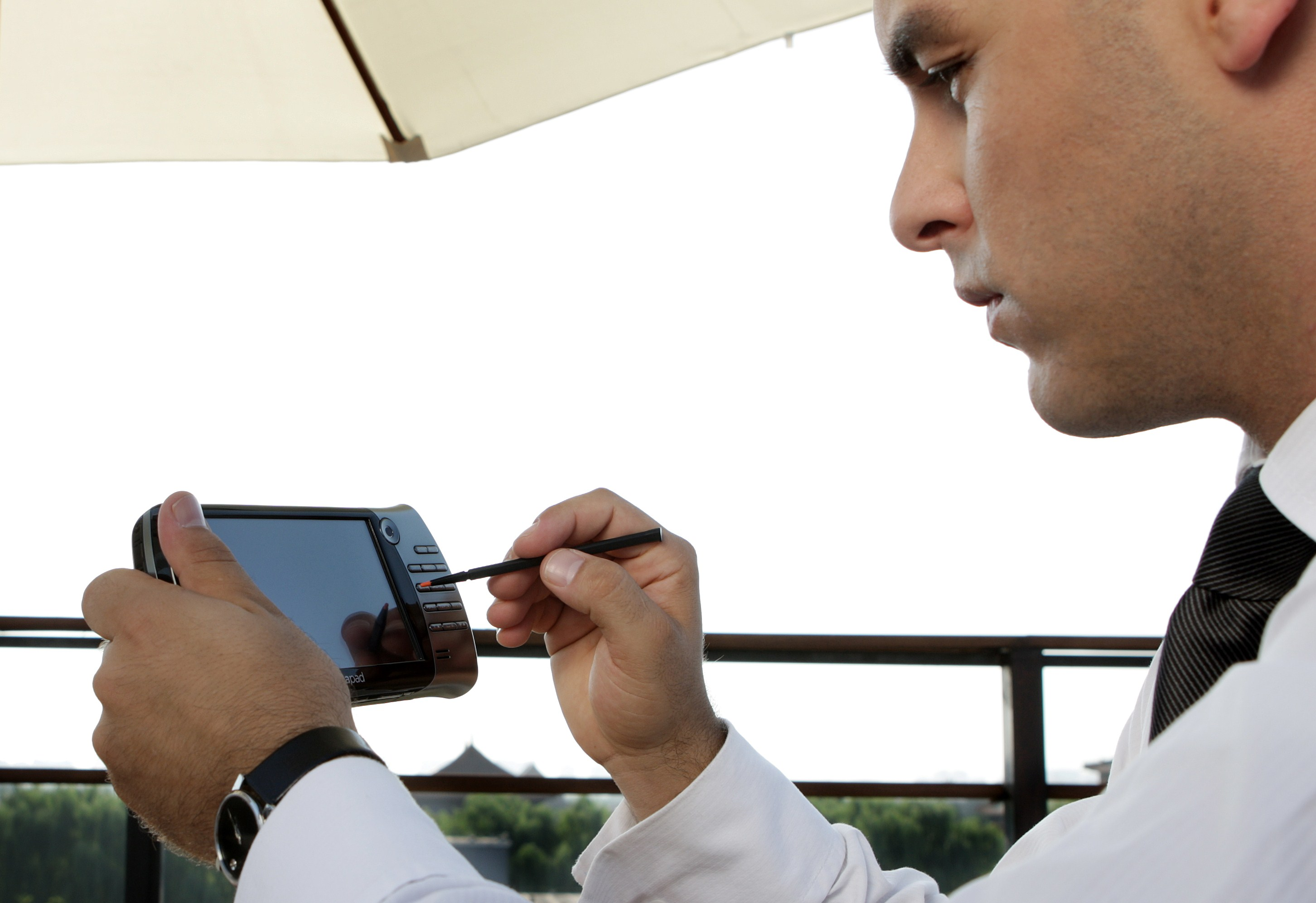
Lenovo Ideapad U8 MID

A mobile Internet device (MID) is a multimedia capable mobile device providing wireless Internet access. They are designed to provide entertainment, information and location-based services for personal or business use. They allow 2-way communication and real-time sharing. They have been described as filling a niche between smartphones and tablet computers.

As all the features of MID started becoming available on smartphones and tablets, the term is now mostly used to refer to both low-end as well as high-end tablets.

== Archos Internet tablets ==
The form factor of mobile Internet tablets from Archos is very similar to the Lenovo image on the right. The class has included multiple operating systems: Windows CE, Windows 7 and Android. The Android tablet uses an ARM Cortex CPU and a touchscreen.

== Intel Mobile Internet Device (MID) platform ==
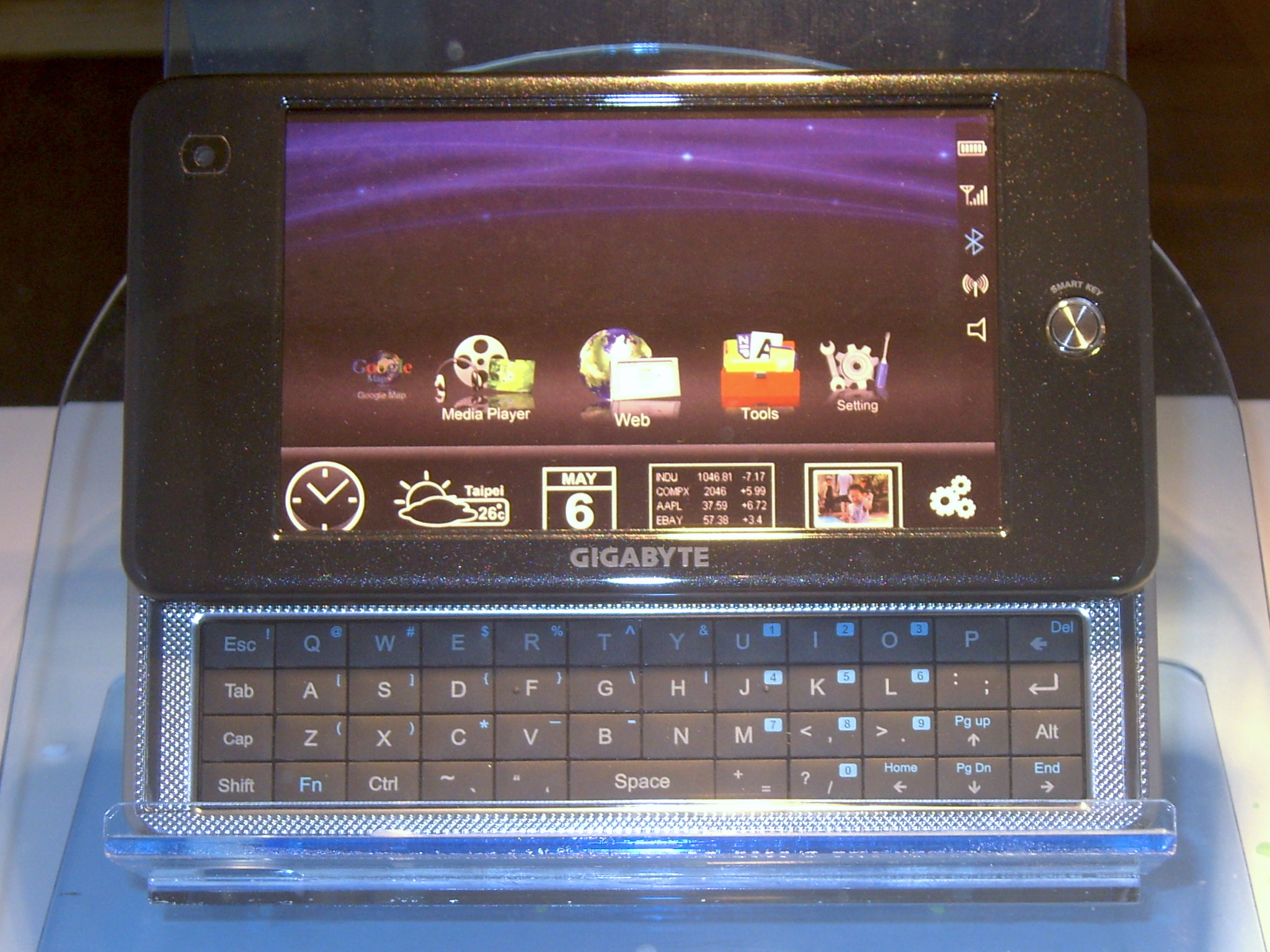
MID with Atom: Gigabyte M528

Intel announced a prototype MID at the Intel Developer Forum in Spring 2007 in Beijing. A MID development kit by Sophia Systems using Intel Centrino Atom was announced in April 2008.

Intel MID platforms are based on an Intel processor and chipset which consume less power than most of the x86 derivatives. A few platforms have been announced as listed below:

=== McCaslin platform (2007) ===
Intel's first generation MID platform (codenamed McCaslin) contains a 90 nm Intel A100/A110 processor (codenamed Stealey) which runs at 600–800 MHz.

Centrino	McCaslin platform
Mobile chipset	an Intel 945GU Express MCH northbridge (codenamed Little River) with integrated GMA 950 graphics and an ICH7-U southbridge
Mobile processor	a 90 nm Intel A100/A110 processor (codenamed Stealey)
Wireless network	a wireless radio

=== Menlow platform (2008) ===
On 2 March 2008, Intel introduced the Intel Atom processor brand for a new family of low-power processor platforms. The components have thin, small designs and work together to "enable the best mobile computing and Internet experience" on mobile and low-power devices.

Intel's second generation MID platform (codenamed Menlow) contains a 45 nm Intel Atom processor (codenamed Silverthorne) which can run up to 2.0 GHz and a System Controller Hub (codenamed Poulsbo) which includes Intel HD Audio (codenamed Azalia). This platform was initially branded as Centrino Atom but such practice was discontinued in Q3 2008.

Centrino	Menlow platform
Mobile chipset	an Intel SCH (codenamed Poulsbo) with integrated GMA 500 graphics (PowerVR SGX 535 based)
Mobile processor	a 45 nm Intel Atom processor (codenamed Silverthorne)
Wireless network	a wireless radio

=== Moorestown platform (2010) ===
Intel's third generation MID/smartphone platform (codenamed Moorestown) contains a 45 nm Intel Atom processor (codenamed Lincroft ) and a separate 65 nm Platform Controller Hub (codenamed Langwell). Since the memory controller and graphics controller are all now integrated into the processor, the northbridge has been removed and the processor communicates directly with the southbridge via the DMI bus interface.

Atom	Moorestown platform
Mobile chipset	a 65 nm Intel PCH (codenamed Langwell) and an MSIC (codenamed Briertown)
Mobile processor	a 45 nm Intel Atom processor (codenamed Lincroft) with integrated GMA 600 graphics (PowerVR SGX 535 based)
Wireless network	a wireless radio (codenamed Evans Peak)

=== Medfield platform (2012) ===
Intel's fourth generation MID/smartphone platform (codenamed Medfield) contains their first complete Intel Atom SoC (codenamed Penwell), produced on 32 nm.

Atom	Medfield platform
Mobile processor	a 32 nm Intel Atom SoC (codenamed Penwell) with integrated CPU (codenamed Saltwell) and graphics (PowerVR SGX 540 based)
Wireless network	a wireless radio

=== Clover Trail+ platform (2012) ===
Intel's MID/smartphone platform (codenamed Clover Trail+) based on its Clover Trail tablet platform. It contains a 32 nm Intel Atom SoC (codenamed Cloverview).

Atom	Clover Trail+ platform
Mobile processor	a 32 nm Intel Atom SoC (codenamed Cloverview) with integrated CPU (codenamed Saltwell) and graphics (PowerVR SGX 545 based)
Wireless network	a wireless radio

=== Merrifield platform (2013) ===
Intel's fifth generation MID/smartphone platform (codenamed Merrifield ) contains a 22 nm Intel Atom SoC (codenamed Tangier).

Atom	Merrifield platform
Mobile processor	an Intel Atom SoC (codenamed Tangier) with integrated CPU (codenamed Silvermont) and graphics (PowerVR G6400)
Wireless network	a wireless radio

=== Moorefield platform (2014) ===
Intel's sixth generation MID/smartphone platform (codenamed Moorefield) contains a 22 nm Intel Atom SoC (codenamed Anniedale).

Atom	Moorefield platform
Mobile processor	an Intel Atom SoC (codenamed Anniedale) with integrated CPU (codenamed Airmont) and graphics (PowerVR G6430)
Wireless network	a wireless radio

=== Morganfield platform ===
Intel's seventh generation MID/smartphone platform (codenamed Morganfield) contains a 14 nm Intel Atom SoC (codenamed Broxton).

Atom	Morganfield platform
Mobile processor	an Intel Atom SoC (codenamed Broxton) with integrated CPU (codenamed Goldmont) and graphics (Gen 9)
Wireless network	a wireless radio

=== Operating system ===
Intel announced collaboration with Ubuntu to create Ubuntu for mobile internet devices distribution, known as Ubuntu Mobile. Ubuntu's website said the new distribution "will provide a rich Internet experience for users of Intel’s 2008 Mobile Internet Device (MID) platform." Ubuntu Mobile ended active development in 2009.

== See also ==
- Centrino
- Phablet
- Android (operating system)
- CrunchPad
- Moblin project
- Netbook / smartbook
- Ubuntu Mobile
- Ultra-mobile PC (UMPC)
- WiMAX
- Mobile web
