= Intel Atom =

Microprocessor brand name by Intel

- Logo since 2020

General information
- Launched: 2008–2009 (as Centrino Atom); 2008–present (as Atom)
- Marketed by: Intel
- Designed by: Intel
- Common manufacturer: Intel

Performance
- Max. CPU clock rate: 600 MHz to 4.0 GHz
- FSB speeds: 400 MT/s to 667 MT/s

Physical specifications
- Cores: 1, 2, 4, 8, 12, 16, 24
- GPU: Intel Graphics Technology (some)
- Package: 441-ball µFCBGA

Architecture and classification
- Technology node: 45 nm to Intel 7
- Instruction set: IA-32, x86-64 (not for the N2xx and Z5xx series)
- Extensions: AES-NI, CLMUL, RDRAND, SHA, TXT; MMX, SSE, SSE2, SSE3, SSSE3, SSE4.1, SSE4.2; AVX, AVX2, FMA3, AVX-VNNI; VT-x, VT-d

Products, models, variants
- Core names: Silverthorne; Diamondville; Pineview; Lincroft; Centerton; Avoton; Silvermont; Goldmont; Goldmont Plus; Tremont; Gracemont

History
- Predecessor: Stealey

Intel Atom is a line of IA-32 and x86-64 instruction set ultra-low-voltage processors by Intel Corporation designed to reduce electric consumption and power dissipation in comparison with ordinary processors of the Intel Core series. Atom is mainly used in netbooks, nettops, embedded applications ranging from health care to advanced robotics, mobile Internet devices (MIDs) and phones. The line was originally designed in 45 nm complementary metal–oxide–semiconductor (CMOS) technology and subsequent models, codenamed Cedar, used a 32 nm process.

The first generation of Atom processors are based on the Bonnell microarchitecture. On December 21, 2009, Intel announced the Pine Trail platform, including new Atom processor code-named Pineview (Atom N450), with total kit power consumption down 20%. On December 28, 2011, Intel updated the Atom line with the Cedar processors.

In December 2012, Intel launched the 64-bit Centerton family of Atom CPUs, designed specifically for use in servers. Centerton adds features previously unavailable in Atom processors, such as Intel VT virtualization technology and support for ECC memory. On September 4, 2013, Intel launched a 22 nm successor to Centerton, codenamed Avoton.

In regard to Atom, Intel changed its direction after 2020. Instead of aiming Atom as a processor for mainstream devices as originally planned, it was repurposed/reoriented as a low power processor for low-cost laptops, embedded, edge, networking, and IoT applications. However, to compensate for the void created by Atom's exit as the leading processor for mainstream devices, Intel introduced the Pentium and Celeron low-power chips for desktops/PCs that duly inherited Atom's noted low-power heritage.

== History ==
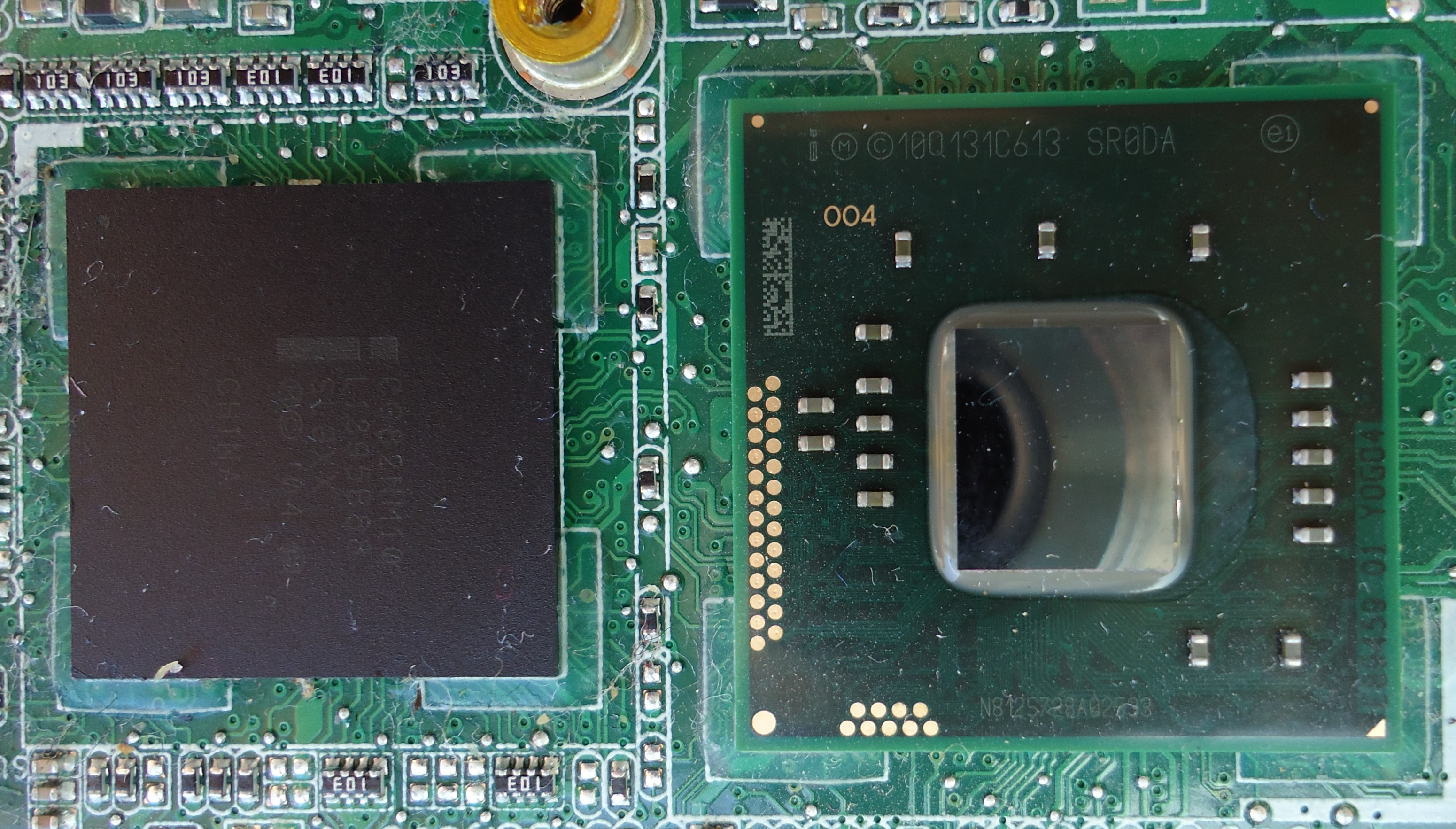
Intel Atom N2800

Intel Atom is a direct successor of the Intel A100 and A110 low-power processors (code-named Stealey), which were built on a 90 nm process, had 512 kB L2 cache and ran at 600 MHz/800 MHz with 3 W TDP (Thermal Design Power). Prior to the Silverthorne announcement, outside sources had speculated that Atom would compete with AMD's Geode system-on-a-chip processors, used by the One Laptop per Child (OLPC) project, and other cost and power sensitive applications for x86 processors. However, Intel revealed on October 15, 2007, that it was developing another new mobile processor, codenamed Diamondville, for OLPC-type devices.

"Atom" was the name under which Silverthorne would be sold, while the supporting chipset formerly code-named Menlow was called Centrino Atom.

At Spring Intel Developer Forum (IDF) 2008 in Shanghai, Intel officially announced that Silverthorne and Diamondville are based on the same microarchitecture. Silverthorne would be called the Atom Z5xx series and Diamondville would be called the Atom N2xx series. The more expensive lower-power Silverthorne parts was to be used in Intel mobile Internet devices (MIDs) whereas Diamondville was to be used in low-cost desktop and notebooks. Intel and Lenovo also jointly announced an Atom powered MID called the IdeaPad U8.

In April 2008, a MID development kit was announced by Sophia Systems and the first board called CoreExpress-ECO was revealed by a German company LiPPERT Embedded Computers, GmbH. Intel offers Atom based motherboards.

In December 2012, Intel released Atom for servers, the S1200 series. The primary difference between these processors and all prior versions, is that ECC memory support has been added, enabling the use of the Atom in mission-critical server environments that demand redundancy and memory failure protection.

In 2024, Intel's Atom-derived Crestmont architecture became the basis of Sierra Forest, the first Xeon server line built entirely from Efficiency-cores rather than traditional Core-based cores.

Intel Atom processor family
MID / Ultra-mobile PC / Lifestyle PC
Sticker	Code name	Series	Core	On-die GPU	GPU clk	TDP	HT	Intel 64	Intel VT-x	Release date
Intel Atom logo 2008	Silverthorne	Z5xx	single (45 nm)	No	200 MHz	0.65 - 2 W	No	No	No	Apr 2008
Intel Atom logo 2008	Silverthorne	Z5xx	single (45 nm)	No	200 MHz	2 - 2.4 W	Yes	No	Some	Apr 2008
Intel Atom logo 2009	Lincroft	Z6xx	single (45 nm)	Yes	400 MHz	1.3 - 3 W	Yes	No	No	May 2010
Classmate PC / Netbook / Nettop / Lifestyle PC
Sticker	Code name	Series	Core	On-die GPU	GPU clk	TDP	HT	Intel 64	Intel VT-x	Release date
Intel Atom logo 2008	Diamondville	N2xx	single (45 nm)	No	n/a	2.5 W	Yes	No	No	Jun 2008
Intel Atom logo 2008	Diamondville	2xx	single (45 nm)	No	n/a	4 W	Yes	Yes (if enabled)	No	Jun 2008
Intel Atom logo 2008	Diamondville	3xx	dual (45 nm)	No	n/a	8 W	Yes	Yes (if enabled)	No	Sep 2008
Intel Atom logo 2009	Pineview	N4xx	single (45 nm)	Yes	200 MHz	6.5 W	Yes	Yes (if enabled)	No	Jan 2010
Intel Atom logo 2009	Pineview	D4xx	single (45 nm)	Yes	400 MHz	10 W	Yes	Yes (if enabled)	No	Jan 2010
Intel Atom logo 2009	Pineview	N5xx	dual (45 nm)	Yes	200 MHz	8.5 W	Yes	Yes (if enabled)	No	Jan 2010
Intel Atom logo 2009	Pineview	D5xx	dual (45 nm)	Yes	400 MHz	13 W	Yes	Yes (if enabled)	No	Jan 2010
Intel Atom logo 2009	Cedarview	D2500	dual (32 nm)	Yes	400 MHz	10 W	No	Yes (if enabled)	No	Nov 2011
Intel Atom logo 2009	Cedarview	D2550	dual (32 nm)	Yes	640 MHz	10 W	Yes	Yes (if enabled)	No	Mar 2012
Intel Atom logo 2009	Cedarview	D2700	dual (32 nm)	Yes	640 MHz	10 W	Yes	Yes (if enabled)	No	Nov 2011
Intel Atom logo 2009	Cedarview	N2600	dual (32 nm)	Yes	400 MHz	3.5 W	Yes	Yes (if enabled)	No	Dec 2011
Intel Atom logo 2009	Cedarview	N2800	dual (32 nm)	Yes	640 MHz	6.5 W	Yes	Yes (if enabled)	No	Dec 2011
Server / Storage
Sticker	Code name	Series	Core	Base CPU clk	Max. CPU clk	TDP	HT	SATA ports	LAN ports	Release date
(with On-die; GPU, Intel 64 and Intel VT-x)	Centerton	S1220	dual (32 nm)	1.60 GHz		8.1 W	No			Dec 2012
(with On-die; GPU, Intel 64 and Intel VT-x)	Centerton	S1240	dual (32 nm)	1.60 GHz		6.1 W	No			Dec 2012
(with On-die; GPU, Intel 64 and Intel VT-x)	Centerton	S1260	dual (32 nm)	2.00 GHz		8.6 W	No			Dec 2012
(with On-die; GPU, Intel 64 and Intel VT-x)	Briarwood	S1269	dual (32 nm)	1.60 GHz		11.7 W	No			
(with On-die; GPU, Intel 64 and Intel VT-x)	Briarwood	S1279	dual (32 nm)	1.60 GHz		13.1 W	No			
(with On-die; GPU, Intel 64 and Intel VT-x)	Briarwood	S1289	dual (32 nm)	2.00 GHz		14.1 W	No			
(with On-die; GPU, Intel 64 and Intel VT-x)	Avoton	C2350	dual (22 nm)	1.70 GHz	2.00 GHz	6 W	No	2	4	Sep 2013
(with On-die; GPU, Intel 64 and Intel VT-x)	Avoton	C2530	quad (22 nm)	1.70 GHz	2.40 GHz	9 W	No	2	2	Sep 2013
(with On-die; GPU, Intel 64 and Intel VT-x)	Avoton	C2550	quad (22 nm)	2.40 GHz	2.60 GHz	14 W	No	6	4	Sep 2013
(with On-die; GPU, Intel 64 and Intel VT-x)	Avoton	C2730	octa (22 nm)	1.70 GHz	2.40 GHz	12 W	No	2	2	Sep 2013
(with On-die; GPU, Intel 64 and Intel VT-x)	Avoton	C2750	octa (22 nm)	2.40 GHz	2.60 GHz	20 W	No	6	4	Sep 2013
	Rangeley		octa (22 nm)			6 - 20 W				
	Denverton		16 (14 nm)			8.5 - 32 W				
	Snow Ridge		24 (10 nm)							
	Parker Ridge		octa (10 nm)							
List of Intel Atom processors

== Availability ==
Atom processors became available to system manufacturers in 2008. Because they are soldered onto a mainboard, like northbridges and southbridges, Atom processors are not available to home users or system builders as separate processors, although they may be obtained preinstalled on some ITX motherboards. The Diamondville and Pineview Atom is used in the HP Mini Series, Asus N10, Lenovo IdeaPad S10, Acer Aspire One & Packard Bell's "dot" (ZG5), recent ASUS Eee PC systems, Sony VAIO M-series, AMtek Elego, Dell Inspiron Mini Series, Gigabyte M912, LG X Series, Samsung NC10, Sylvania g Netbook Meso, Toshiba NB series (100, 200, 205, 255, 300, 500, 505), MSI Wind PC netbooks, RedFox Wizbook 1020i, Sony Vaio X Series, Zenith Z-Book, a range of Aleutia desktops, Magic W3, Archos and the ICP-DAS LP-8381-Atom. The Pineview line is also used in multiple AAC devices for the disabled individual who is unable to speak and the AAC device assists the user in everyday communication with dedicated speech software.

== Marketing ==
Intel has applied the Atom branding to product lines targeting several different market segments, including: MID/UMPC/Smartphone, Netbook/Nettop, Tablet, Embedded, Wireless Base Stations (for 5G networking infrastructure), Microserver/Server and Consumer electronics.

Intel consumer electronic (CE) SoCs are marketed under the Atom brand. Prior to application of the Atom brand, there were number of Intel CE SoCs including: Olo River (CE 2110 which had an XScale ARM architecture) and Canmore (CE 3100 which like Stealey and Tolapai had a 90 nm Pentium M microarchitecture). Intel Atom CE branded SoCs include: Sodaville, Groveland, and Berryville.

== Instruction set architecture ==
All Atom processors implement the IA-32 instruction set; support for the x86-64 instruction set was not added until the desktop Diamondville and mobile Pineview cores. The Atom N2xx and Z5xx series Atom models cannot run x86-64 code. The Centerton server processors also support the x86-64 instruction set.

Intel states the Atom supports 64-bit operation only "with a processor, chipset, BIOS" that all support Intel 64. Those Atom systems not supporting all of these cannot enable Intel 64. As a result, the ability of an Atom-based system to run 64-bit versions of operating systems may vary from one motherboard to another. Online retailer mini-itx.com has tested Atom-based motherboards made by Intel and Jetway, and while they were able to install 64-bit versions of Linux on Intel-branded motherboards with D2700 (Cedarview; supports maximum of 4 GB memory DDR3-800/1066, but sometimes these SoC support more than 4 GB of RAM) processors, Intel 64 support was not enabled on a Jetway-branded motherboard with a D2550 (Cedarview) processor.

Even among Atom-based systems which have Intel 64 enabled, not all are able to run 64-bit versions of Microsoft Windows. For those Pineview processors which support 64-bit operation, Intel Download Center currently provides 64-bit Windows Vista and Windows 7 drivers for Intel GMA 3150 graphics, found in Pineview processors. However, no 64-bit Windows drivers are available for Intel Atom Cedarview processors, released Q3 2011. However, Intel's Bay Trail-M processors, built on the Silvermont microarchitecture and released in the second half of 2013, regain 64-bit support, although driver support for Linux and Windows 7 is limited at launch.

The lack of 64-bit Windows support for Cedarview processors has been speculated to be due to a driver issue. A member of the Intel Enthusiast Team has stated in a series of posts on enthusiast site Tom's Hardware that while the Atom D2700 (Cedarview) was designed with Intel 64 support, due to a "limitation of the board" Intel had pulled their previously available 64-bit drivers for Windows 7 and would not provide any further 64-bit support. Some system manufacturers have similarly stated that their motherboards with Atom Cedarview processors lack 64-bit support due to a "lack of Intel® 64-bit VGA driver support". Because all Cedarview processors use the same Intel GMA 3600 or 3650 graphics as the D2700, this indicates that Atom Cedarview systems will remain unable to run 64-bit versions of Windows, even those which have Intel 64 enabled and are able to run 64-bit versions of Linux.

== Microarchitecture ==
The first Atom processors were based on the Bonnell microarchitecture.

Those Atom processors are able to execute up to two instructions per cycle. Like many other x86 processors, they translate x86-instructions (CISC instructions) into simpler internal operations (sometimes referred to as micro-ops, i.e., effectively RISC style instructions) prior to execution. The majority of instructions produce one micro-op when translated, with around 4% of instructions used in typical programs producing multiple micro-ops. The number of instructions that produce more than one micro-op is significantly fewer than the P6 and NetBurst microarchitectures. In the Bonnell microarchitecture, internal micro-ops can contain both a memory load and a memory store in connection with an ALU operation, thus being more similar to the x86 level and more powerful than the micro-ops used in previous designs. This enables relatively good performance with only two integer ALUs, and without any instruction reordering, speculative execution, or register renaming. The Bonnell microarchitecture therefore represents a partial revival of the principles used in earlier Intel designs such as P5 and the i486, with the sole purpose of enhancing the performance per watt ratio. However, Hyper-Threading is implemented in an easy (i.e., low power) way to employ the whole pipeline efficiently by avoiding typical single thread dependencies.

Atom branded processors have historically featured the following microarchitectures:

- Bonnell
  - Saltwell
- Silvermont
  - Airmont
- Goldmont
  - Goldmont Plus
- Tremont
- Gracemont
- Crestmont

== Performance ==
The performance of a single-core Atom is about half that of a Pentium M of the same clock rate. For example, the Atom N270 (1.60 GHz) found in many netbooks such as the Eee PC can deliver around 3300 MIPS and 2.1 GFLOPS in standard benchmarks, compared to 7400 MIPS and 3.9 GFLOPS for the similarly clocked (1.72 GHz) Pentium M 740.

The Pineview platform has proven to be only slightly faster than the previous Diamondville platform. This is because the Pineview platform uses the same Bonnell execution core as Diamondville and is connected to the memory controller via the FSB, hence memory latency and performance in CPU-intensive applications are minimally improved.

== Collaborations ==
In March 2009, Intel announced that it would be collaborating with TSMC for the production of the Atom processors. The deal was put on hold due to lack of demand in 2010.

On September 13, 2011, Intel and Google held a joint announcement of a partnership to provide support in Google's Android operating system for Intel processors (beginning with the Atom). This would allow Intel to supply chips for the growing smartphone and tablet market.

Based on this collaboration, in 2012, Intel announced a new system on chip (SoC) platform designed for smartphones and tablets which would use the Atom line of CPUs. It was a continuation of the partnership announced by Intel and Google on September 13, 2011, to provide support for the Android operating system on Intel x86 processors. This range competed with existing SoCs developed for the smartphone and tablet market from companies like Texas Instruments, Nvidia, Qualcomm and Samsung. On April 29, 2016, Intel announced the decision to cancel the Broxton SoC for smartphones and tablets. Broxton was to use the newest Atom microarchitecture (Goldmont on a 14 nm node) in combination with an Intel modem.

== Competition ==
Embedded processors based on the ARM version 7 instruction set architecture (such as Nvidia's Tegra 3 series, TI's 4 series and Freescale's i.MX51 based on the Cortex-A8 core, or the Qualcomm Snapdragon and Marvell Armada 500/600 based on custom ARMv7 implementations) offer similar performance to the low end Atom chipsets but at roughly one quarter the power consumption, and (like most ARM systems) as a single integrated system on a chip, rather than a two chip solution like the current Atom line. Although the second-generation Atom codenamed "Pineview" should greatly increase its competitiveness in performance/watt, ARM plans to counter the threat with the multi-core capable Cortex-A9 core as used in Nvidia's Tegra 2/3, TI's OMAP 4 series, and Qualcomm's next-generation Snapdragon series, among others.

The Nano and Nano Dual-Core series from VIA is slightly above the average thermal envelope of the Atom, but offers hardware AES support, random number generators, and out-of-order execution. Performance comparisons of the Intel Atom against the Via Nano indicate that a single core Intel Atom is easily outperformed by the Via Nano which is in turn outperformed by a dual core Intel Atom 330 in tests where multithreading is used. The Core 2 Duo SU7300 outperforms the dual-core Nano.

The Xcore86 (also known as the PMX 1000) is x586 based System on Chip (SoC) that offers a below average thermal envelope compared to the Atom.

In 2014, Kenton Williston of EE Times said that while Atom will not displace ARM from its current markets, the ability to apply the PC architecture into smaller, cheaper and lower power form factors will open up new markets for Intel.

In 2014, ARM claimed that Intel's Atom processors offer less compatibility and lower performance than their chips when running Android, and higher power consumption and less battery life for the same tasks under both Android and Windows.

== Issues ==
In February 2017 Cisco reported a clock signal issue that would disable several of its products. Cisco stated, "we expect product failures to increase over the years, beginning after the unit has been in operation for approximately 18 months". Soon after, The Register broke the news that this issue was linked to the Intel Atom SoC, and reports of other vendors being affected started appearing online. This issue affects only C2000 chips, so only the SoC families Avoton and Rangeley from the Silvermont microarchitecture.

== See also ==
- List of Intel Atom processors
- Intel Edison
- Intel Quark
