= Intel Developer Forum =

Defunct technology conference organized by Intel

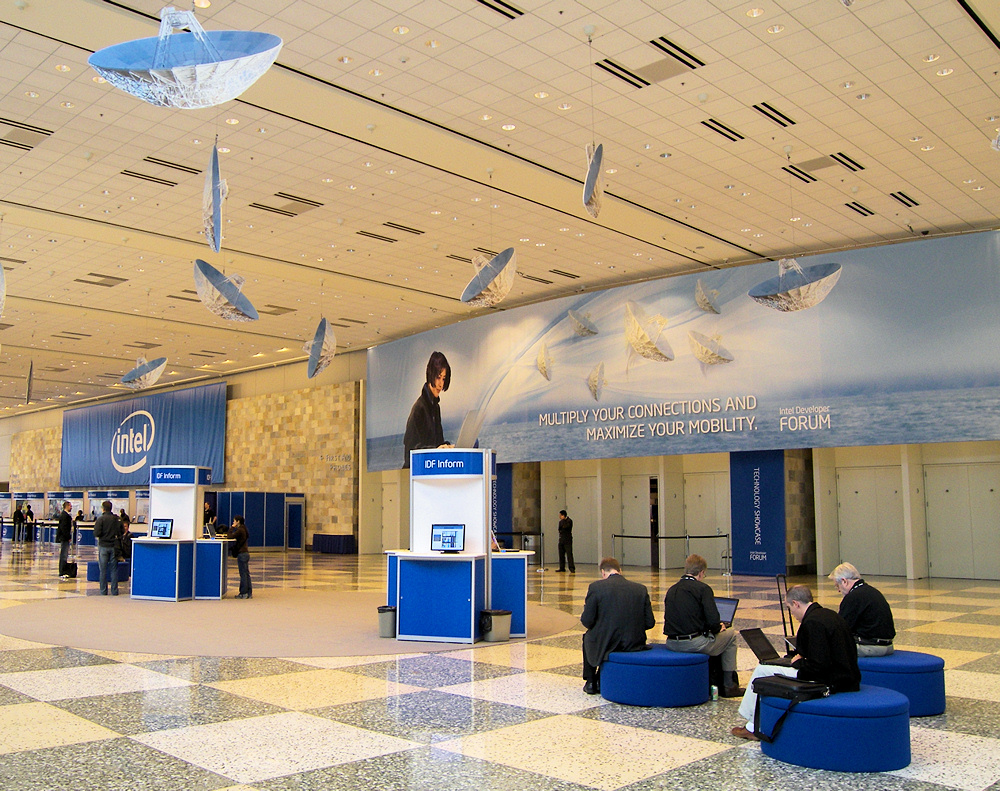
The Fall 2007 Intel Developer Forum in San Francisco

The Intel Developer Forum (IDF) was a biannual gathering of technologists to discuss Intel products and products based on Intel products. The first IDF was held in 1997.

To emphasize the importance of China, the Spring 2007 IDF was held in Beijing instead of San Francisco, and San Francisco and Taipei shared the Fall IDF event in September and October, respectively. Three IDF shows were scheduled in 2008; with the date of IDF San Francisco notably moving to August rather than September. In previous years, events were held in major cities around the world such as San Francisco, Mumbai, Bangalore, Moscow, Cairo, São Paulo, Amsterdam, Munich and Tokyo.

On April 17, 2017, Intel announced that it would no longer be hosting IDF. As a result of this announcement, IDF17, which was scheduled for August in San Francisco, was canceled.

== 2007 events ==
- April 17–18, 2007 – Beijing, China
- September 18–20, 2007 – San Francisco, United States
- October 15–16, 2007 – Taipei, Taiwan

== 2008 events ==
- April 2–3, 2008 – Shanghai, China
- August 19–21, 2008 – San Francisco, United States
- October 20–21, 2008 – Taipei, Taiwan

== 2009 events ==
- April 8–9, 2009 – Beijing, China
- September 22–24, 2009 – San Francisco, United States
- November 16–17, 2009 – Taipei, Taiwan

== 2010 events ==
- April 13–14, 2010 – Beijing, China
- September 13–15, 2010 – San Francisco, United States

== 2011 events ==
- April 12–13, 2011 – Beijing, China
- September 13–15, 2011 – San Francisco, United States

== 2012 events ==
- April 11–12, 2012 – Beijing, China
- May 15, 2012 – São Paulo, Brazil
- September 11–13, 2012 – San Francisco, United States

== 2013 events ==
- April 10–11, 2013 – Beijing, China
- September 10–12, 2013 – San Francisco, United States

== 2014 events ==
- March 8–10, 2014 – Shenzhen, China
- September 9-11, 2014 – San Francisco, United States

== 2015 events ==
- April 7-10, 2015 – Shenzhen, China
- August 18–20, 2015 – San Francisco, United States

== 2016 events ==
- April 13-14, 2016 – Shenzhen, China
- August 16–18, 2016 – San Francisco, United States

== 2017 events ==
Intel originally announced that in 2017, no event would be hosted in China and that the San Francisco event would feature a new format.

On April 17, The event was cancelled with the retirement of the entire program.
