= N550 =

N550 can refer to:

- Atom N550, a CPU model made by Intel
- London Buses route N550
- A quality of Carbon black
