= List of Intel Atom processors =

Intel Atom is Intel's line of low-power, low-cost and low-performance x86 and x86-64 microprocessors. Atom, with codenames of Silverthorne and Diamondville, was first announced on March 2, 2008.

For nettop and netbook Atom microprocessors after Diamondville, the memory and graphics controller are moved from the northbridge to the CPU. This explains the drastically increased transistor count for post-Diamondville Atom microprocessors.

== Nettop processors (small desktop) ==
=== Bonnell microarchitecture ===
==== "Diamondville" (45 nm) ====
- All models support: MMX, SSE, SSE2, SSE3, SSSE3, Intel 64, XD bit (an NX bit implementation), Hyper-Threading
- Transistors: 47 million
- Die size: 25.96 mm^{2} (3.27 × 7.94)
- Package size: 22 mm × 22 mm

Model	sSpec number	Cores	Clock rate	L2 cache	FSB	Mult.	Voltage	TDP	Socket	Release date	Part number(s)	Release price (USD)
Atom 230	SLB6Z (C0)	1	1.6 GHz	512 KB	533 MT/s	12×	0.9–1.1625 V	4 W	BGA 437	June 3, 2008	AU80586RE025D	$29
Atom 330	SLG9Y (C0)	2	1.6 GHz	2 × 512 KB	533 MT/s	12×	0.9–1.1625 V	8 W	BGA 437	June 3, 2008	AU80587RE0251M	$43

==== "Pineview" (45 nm) ====
- All models support: MMX, SSE, SSE2, SSE3, SSSE3, Intel 64, XD bit (an NX bit implementation), Hyper-Threading
- Integrated GMA 3150 GPU and DDR3/DDR2 single-channel memory controller
- Transistors: 123 million (single-core), 176 million (dual-core)
- Die size: 66 mm^{2} (9.56 × 6.89) (single-core), 87 mm^{2} (9.56 × 9.06) (dual core)
- Package size: 22 mm × 22 mm

Model	sSpec number	Cores	Clock rate	GPU frequency	L2 cache	I/O bus	Memory	Voltage	TDP	Socket	Release date	Part number(s)	Release price (USD)
Atom D410	SLBMH (A0)	1	1.67 GHz	400 MHz	512 KB	DMI	1 × DDR2-800	0.8–1.175 V	10 W	FC-BGA 559	January 4, 2010	AU80610004671AA	$43
Atom D425	SLBXD (A0)	1	1.83 GHz	400 MHz	512 KB	DMI	1 × DDR2-800; 1 × DDR3-800	0.8–1.175 V	10 W	FC-BGA 559	June 21, 2010	AU80610006252AA	$42
Atom D510	SLBLA (B0)	2	1.67 GHz	400 MHz	2 × 512 KB	DMI	1 × DDR2-800	0.8–1.175 V	13 W	FC-BGA 559	December 21, 2009	AU80610004392AA	$63
Atom D525	SLBXC (B0)	2	1.83 GHz	400 MHz	2 × 512 KB	DMI	1 × DDR2-800; 1 × DDR3-800	0.8–1.175 V	13 W	FC-BGA 559	June 21, 2010	AU80610006225AA	$63

=== Saltwell microarchitecture ===
==== "Cedarview" (32 nm) ====
- All models support: MMX, SSE, SSE2, SSE3, SSSE3, Intel 64, XD bit (an NX bit implementation), Hyper-Threading (except D2500)
- Integrated PowerVR SGX545-based Intel GMA 3600/GMA 3650 GPU and DDR3 single-channel memory controller
- Package size: 22 mm × 22 mm

Model	sSpec number	Cores	Clock rate	GPU frequency	L2 cache	I/O bus	Memory	Voltage	TDP	Socket	Release date	Part number(s)	Release price (USD)
Atom D2500	SR0D8 (B2); SR0W0 (B3)	2	1.87 GHz	400 MHz	2 × 512 KB	DMI	1 × DDR3-800; 1 × DDR3-1066	0.91–1.21 V	10 W	FC-BGA 559	November, 2011	DF8064101055400	$42
Atom D2550	SR0QB (B2); SR0VY (B3)	2	1.87 GHz	640 MHz	2 × 512 KB	DMI	1 × DDR3-800; 1 × DDR3-1066	0.91–1.21 V	10 W	FC-BGA 559	March, 2012	DF8064101211300	$47
Atom D2560	SR0QD (B2); SR0W4 (B3)	2	2 GHz	640 MHz	2 × 512 KB	DMI	1 × DDR3-800; 1 × DDR3-1066	0.91–1.21 V	10 W	FC-BGA 559	October, 2012	DF8064101213700	$47
Atom D2700	SR0D9 (B2)	2	2.13 GHz	640 MHz	2 × 512 KB	DMI	1 × DDR3-800; 1 × DDR3-1066	0.91–1.21 V	10 W	FC-BGA 559	November, 2011	DF8064101055647	$52
Atom D2701	SR0W6	2	2.13 GHz	640 MHz	2 × 512 KB		2 × DDR3-800; 2 × DDR3-1066		10 W			DF8064101365900	

== Netbook processors (sub-notebook) ==
=== Bonnell microarchitecture ===
==== "Diamondville" (45 nm) ====
- All models support: MMX, SSE, SSE2, SSE3, SSSE3, Enhanced Intel SpeedStep Technology (EIST), XD bit (an NX bit implementation), Hyper-Threading
- Transistors: 47 million
- Die size: 26 mm^{2}
- Package size: 22 mm × 22 mm

Model	sSpec number	Cores	Clock rate	L2 cache	FSB	Mult.	Voltage	TDP	Socket	Release date	Part number(s)	Release price (USD)
Atom N270	SLB73 (C0)	1	1.6 GHz	512 KB	533 MT/s	12×	0.9–1.1625 V	2.5 W	BGA 437	June 3, 2008	AU80586GE025D	$44
Atom N280	SLGL9 (C0)	1	1.67 GHz	512 KB	667 MT/s	10×	0.9–1.1625 V	2.5 W	BGA 437	February 6, 2009	AU80586GF028D	

==== "Pineview" (45 nm) ====
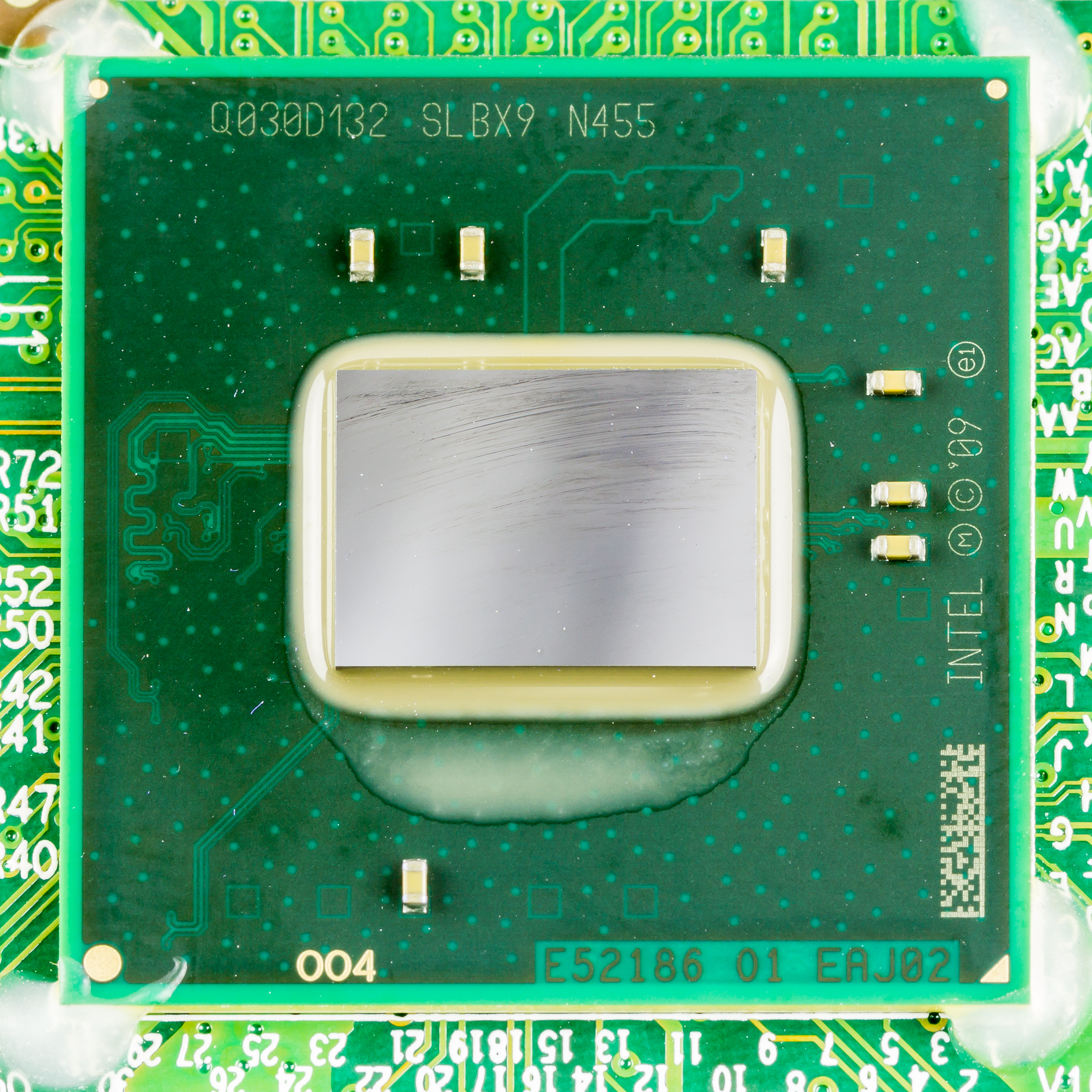
Intel Atom N455

- All models support: MMX, SSE, SSE2, SSE3, SSSE3, Intel 64, Enhanced Intel SpeedStep Technology (EIST), XD bit (an NX bit implementation), Hyper-Threading
- Integrated GMA 3150 GPU and DDR3/DDR2 single-channel memory controller supporting up to 2 GB
- Transistors: 123 million (single-core), 176 million (dual-core)
- Die size: 66 mm^{2} (9.56 × 6.89) (single-core), 87 mm^{2} (9.56 × 9.06) (dual core)
- Package size: 22 mm × 22 mm

Model	sSpec number	Cores	Clock rate	GPU frequency	L2 cache	I/O bus	Memory	Voltage	TDP	Socket	Release date	Part number(s)	Release price (USD)
Atom N435	SLC4C (A0)	1	1.33 GHz	200 MHz	512 KB	DMI	1 × DDR2-667; 1 × DDR3-800	0.8–1.175 V	5.0 W	FC-BGA 559	June 2011	AU80610007533AA	
Atom N450	SLBMG (A0)	1	1.67 GHz	200 MHz	512 KB	DMI	1 × DDR2-667	0.8–1.175 V	5.5 W	FC-BGA 559	December 21, 2009	AU80610004653AA	$63
Atom N455	SLBX9 (A0)	1	1.67 GHz	200 MHz	512 KB	DMI	1 × DDR2-800; 1 × DDR3-800	0.8–1.175 V	6.5 W	FC-BGA 559	June 1, 2010	AU80610006237AA	$75
Atom N470	SLBMF (A0)	1	1.83 GHz	200 MHz	512 KB	DMI	1 × DDR2-667	0.8–1.175 V	6.5 W	FC-BGA 559	March 1, 2010	AU80610003495AA	$75
Atom N475	SLBX5 (A0)	1	1.83 GHz	200 MHz	512 KB	DMI	1 × DDR2-800; 1 × DDR3-800	0.8–1.175 V	6.5 W	FC-BGA 559	June 1, 2010	AU80610006240AA	$75
Atom N550	SLBXF (B0)	2	1.5 GHz	200 MHz	2 × 512 KB	DMI	1 × DDR2-800; 1 × DDR3-800	0.8–1.175 V	8.5 W	FC-BGA 559	August 23, 2010	AU80610006291AA	$86
Atom N570	SLBXE (B0)	2	1.67 GHz	200 MHz	2 × 512 KB	DMI	1 × DDR2-800; 1 × DDR3-800	0.8–1.175 V	8.5 W	FC-BGA 559	March 1, 2011	AU80610006243AA	$86

=== Saltwell microarchitecture ===
==== "Cedarview" (32 nm) ====
- All models support: MMX, SSE, SSE2, SSE3, SSSE3, Intel 64, Enhanced Intel SpeedStep Technology (EIST), XD bit (an NX bit implementation), Hyper-Threading
- Integrated PowerVR SGX545-based Intel GMA 3600/GMA 3650 GPU and DDR3 single-channel memory controller
- Package size: 22 × 22 mm

Model	sSpec number	Cores	Clock rate	GPU frequency	L2 cache	I/O bus	Memory	Voltage	TDP	Socket	Release date	Part number(s)	Release price (USD)
Atom N2100	SR0DC (B2)	1	1.6 GHz	400 MHz	512 KB	DMI	1 × DDR3-800			FC-BGA 559		DF8064101064902	
Atom N2600	SR0DB (B2); SR0W2 (B3)	2	1.6 GHz	400 MHz	2 × 512 KB	DMI	1 × DDR3-800	0.91–1.21 V	3.5 W	FC-BGA 559	December, 2011	DF8064101050706	$42
Atom N2800	SR0DA (B2); SR0W1 (B3)	2	1.87 GHz	640 MHz	2 × 512 KB	DMI	1 × DDR3-1066	0.91–1.21 V	6.5 W	FC-BGA 559	December, 2011	DF8064101050503	$47

== MID processors/SoCs (UMPC/Smartphone/IoT) ==
=== Bonnell microarchitecture ===
==== "Silverthorne" (45 nm) ====
- All models support: MMX, SSE, SSE2, SSE3, SSSE3, Enhanced Intel SpeedStep Technology (EIST), XD bit (an NX bit implementation)
- Models Z520, Z520PT, Z530, Z530P, Z540, Z550 and Z560 support Intel VT-x and Hyper-Threading
- Model Z515 supports Intel Burst Performance Technology
- Uses the Poulsbo chipset.
- Transistors: 47 million
- Die size: 26 mm^{2}
- Package size: 13 mm × 14 mm / 22 mm × 22 mm (processors ending with the P or PT sSpec number)

Model	sSpec number	Cores	Clock rate	L2 cache	FSB	Mult.	Voltage	TDP	Socket	Release date	Part number(s)	Release price (USD)
Atom Z500	SLB6Q (C0)	1	800 MHz	512 KB	400 MT/s	8×	0.712–1.1 V	0.65 W	BGA 441	April 2, 2008	AC80566UC800DE	$45
Atom Z510	SLB2C (C0)	1	1.1 GHz	512 KB	400 MT/s	11×	0.75–1.1 V	2 W	BGA 441	April 2, 2008	AC80566UC005DE	$45
Atom Z510P	SLGPQ (C0)	1	1.1 GHz	512 KB	400 MT/s	11×	0.8–1.1 V	2.2 W	BGA 437	March 2, 2009	CH80566EC005DW	N/A
Atom Z510PT	SLGPR (C0)	1	1.1 GHz	512 KB	400 MT/s	11×	0.75–1.1 V	2.2 W	BGA 437	March 2, 2009	CH80566EC005DT	N/A
Atom Z515	SLGMG (C0)	1	1.2 GHz	512 KB	400 MT/s	12×	0.712–1 V	1.4 W	BGA 441	April 8, 2009	AC80566UC009DV	N/A
Atom Z520	SLB2H (C0)	1	1.33 GHz	512 KB	533 MT/s	10×	0.75–1.1 V	2 W	BGA 441	April 2, 2008	AC80566UE014DW	$65
Atom Z520PT	SLGPP (C0)	1	1.33 GHz	512 KB	533 MT/s	10×	0.9–1.1 V	2.2 W	BGA 437	March 2, 2009	CH80566EE014DT	N/A
Atom Z530	SLB6P (C0)	1	1.6 GHz	512 KB	533 MT/s	12×	0.75–1.1 V	2 W	BGA 441	April 2, 2008	AC80566UE025DW	$95
Atom Z530P	SLGPN (C0)	1	1.6 GHz	512 KB	533 MT/s	12×	0.8–1.1 V	2.2 W	BGA 437	March 2, 2009	CH80566EE025DW	N/A
Atom Z540	SLB2M (C0)	1	1.87 GHz	512 KB	533 MT/s	14×	0.75–1.1 V	2.4 W	BGA 441	April 2, 2008	AC80566UE036DW	$160
Atom Z550	SLGPT (C0)	1	2 GHz	512 KB	533 MT/s	15×	0.75–1.1 V	2.4 W	BGA 441	April 8, 2009	AC80566UE041DW	N/A
Atom Z560	SLH63 (C0)	1	2.13 GHz	512 KB	533 MT/s	16×	0.75–1.1 V	2.5 W	BGA 441	Q2 2010	AC80566UE046DW	$144

==== "Lincroft" (45 nm) ====
- All models support: MMX, SSE, SSE2, SSE3, SSSE3, Enhanced Intel SpeedStep Technology (EIST), XD bit (an NX bit implementation), Hyper-Threading. All except Z605 support Intel Burst Performance Technology (BPT).
- GMA 600 GPU and DDR2 single-channel memory controller are integrated into the processor.
- Transistors: 140 million
- Die size: 7.34 mm × 8.89 mm = 65.2526 mm^{2}
- Package size: 13.8 mm × 13.8 × 1.0 mm
- Steppings: C0

Model	sSpec number	Cores	Clock rate	GPU frequency	L2 cache	I/O bus	Memory	Voltage	TDP	Socket	Release date	Part number(s)	Release price (USD)
Atom Z600	SLBZP (C0); SLBR9	1	1.2 GHz	200 MHz	512 KB	DMI	1 × LPDDR-400	0.7625–1.1 V	1.3 W	FC-BGA 518	May 4, 2010	AY80609004002AC	
Atom Z605	SLC3C (C0); SLBSA; SLC3C	1	1 GHz	—N/a	512 KB	DMI	1 × DDR-400; 1 × DDR2-800		2.2 W	FC-BGA 518	May 4, 2010	AY80609005805AA	
Atom Z610	SLBZQ (C0); SLBS7	1	800 MHz	—N/a	512 KB	DMI	1 × DDR-400; 1 × DDR2-800		1.3 W	FC-BGA 518	May 4, 2010	AY80609005793AA	
Atom Z612	SLBZN (C0); SLBS8	1	900 MHz	—N/a	512 KB	DMI	1 × DDR-400; 1 × DDR2-800		1.3 W	FC-BGA 518	May 4, 2010	AY80609003042AC	
Atom Z615	SLBZL (C0); SLBS9	1	1.6 GHz	400 MHz	512 KB	DMI	1 × DDR2-800	0.7625–1.1 V	2.2 W	FC-BGA 518	May 4, 2010	AY80609005802AA	
Atom Z620	SLBZE (C0); SLBR8	1	900 MHz	—N/a	512 KB	DMI	1 × DDR-400; 1 × DDR2-800		1.3 W	FC-BGA 518	May 4, 2010	AY80609003996AC	
Atom Z625	SLBZD (C0); SLBR7	1	1.9 GHz	400 MHz	512 KB	DMI	1 × DDR2-800	0.7625–1.1 V	2.2 W	FC-BGA 518	May 4, 2010	AY80609003987AB	

=== Saltwell microarchitecture ===
==== "Penwell" (32 nm) ====
- All models support: MMX, SSE, SSE2, SSE3, SSSE3, Enhanced Intel SpeedStep Technology (EIST), XD bit (an NX bit implementation), Intel Burst Performance Technology (BPT), Hyper-Threading.
- Integrated PowerVR SGX540 GPU and DDR3 single-channel memory controller
- Package size: 12 mm × 12 × 1.0 mm
- Transistors: 140 million
- Die size: 65.2526 mm^{2} (7.34 mm x 8.89 mm)

Model	sSpec number	Cores	Clock rate	GPU frequency	L2 cache	I/O bus	Memory	Voltage	TDP	Socket	Release date	Part number(s)	Release price (USD)
Atom Z2420	SR0YF (D1); SR0Z5 (D1)	1	1.2 GHz	400 MHz	512 KB		2 × LPDDR2-800	0.3–1.2 V	3 W	BGA617	January 2013	DG8064001195908	
Atom Z2460	SR0PR (D1); SR0PS (D1); SR0PV (D1); SR0TM (D1); SR0U6 (D1); SR0VZ (D1); SR114 (D1); SR118 (D1)	1	1.3-1.6 GHz	400 MHz	512 KB		2 × LPDDR2-800	0.3–1.2 V	3 W	BGA617	January 2012	DG8064001211503; DG8064001194903; DG8064001195902; DG8064001195703	
Atom Z2480	SR0U7 (D1); SR0ZK (D1); SR111 (D1); SR117 (D1)	1	1.3-2.0 GHz	400 MHz	512 KB		2 × LPDDR2-800	0.3–1.2 V	4 W	BGA617	Q4 2012	DG8064001195906; DG8064001195906; DG8064001195906; DG8064001195906	
Atom Z2610	SR0PT (D1)	1	1.3-1.6 GHz	400 MHz	512 KB		2 × LPDDR2-800		3 W	BGA617	Q2 2012	DG8064001196004	

=== Silvermont microarchitecture ===
==== "Merrifield" (22 nm) ====
- All models support: MMX, SSE, SSE2, SSE3, SSSE3, SSE4.1, SSE4.2, Enhanced Intel SpeedStep Technology (EIST), Intel 64, XD bit (an NX bit implementation), Intel VT-x, AES-NI, Intel Burst Performance Technology (BPT).
- Z3480 also supports Intel Wireless Display.
- Integrated PowerVR G6400 GPU, memory controller supporting two 32-bit LPDDR3 channels up to 4 GB, USB 3.0 controller, eMMC 4.5
- Paired with Intel XMM 7160 LTE modem supporting 4G/3G/2G
- Package size: 12 mm × 12 × 1.0 mm

Model	sSpec number	Cores	Clock rate	GPU frequency	L2 cache	I/O bus	Memory	Voltage	TDP	Socket	Release date	Part number(s)	Release price (USD)
Atom Z3460	SR1WR (B1); SR20G (B1); SR20U (B1)	2	1.6 GHz	400-457 MHz	1 MB		2 × LPDDR3-1066				March 2014	FG8065201850100	
Atom Z3480	SR1WS (B1); SR20F (B1)	2	2.13 GHz	457-533 MHz	1 MB		2 × LPDDR3-1066				March 2014	FG8065201850200	

==== "Moorefield" (22 nm) ====
- All models support: MMX, SSE, SSE2, SSE3, SSSE3, SSE4.1, SSE4.2, Enhanced Intel SpeedStep Technology (EIST), Intel 64, XD bit (an NX bit implementation), Intel VT-x, AES-NI, Intel Burst Performance Technology (BPT), Intel Wireless Display.
- GPU (PowerVR G6430) and memory controller are integrated onto the processor die
- Package size: 14 mm × 14 × 1.0 mm

Model	sSpec number	Cores	Clock rate	GPU frequency	L2 cache	I/O bus	Memory	Voltage	TDP	Socket	Release date	Part number(s)	Release price (USD)
Atom Z3530	SR1YR (B0)	4	1.33 GHz	457 MHz	2 × 1 MB		2 × LPDDR3-1600				H2 2014	GA8066301896101	
Atom Z3560	SR1WW (B0); SR1WX (B0)	4	1.83 GHz	457–533 MHz	2 × 1 MB		2 × LPDDR3-1600				H2 2014	GA8066301600200	
Atom Z3570		4	2.00 GHz	457–640 MHz	2 × 1 MB		2 × LPDDR3-1600				Q4 2014		
Atom Z3580	SR1WU (B0); SR1WV (B0)	4	2.33 GHz	457–533 MHz	2 × 1 MB		2 × LPDDR3-1600				H2 2014	GA8066301600100	
Atom Z3590	SR2GC (B0); SR2GD (B0)	4	2.50 GHz	457-640 MHz	2 × 1 MB		2 × LPDDR3-1600				Q3 2015	GA8066301828200	

==== "SoFIA" (28 nm) ====
- SoFIA (smart or feature phone with Intel architecture)
- All models support: MMX, SSE, SSE2, SSE3, SSSE3, SSE4, Enhanced Intel SpeedStep Technology (EIST), Intel 64, XD bit (an NX bit implementation), Intel Burst Performance Technology (BPT), Intel VT-x, AES-NI (based on Silvermont's specs)
- GPU (ARM Mali) and memory controller are integrated onto the processor die
- Package size: 34 × 40 mm
- SoFIA 3G SoC with Silvermont CPU
  - Integrated HSPA+ A-GOLD 620: 2G/3G RF, CNV, PMU, Audio (Atom x3-C3130)
- SoFIA 3G–R SoC with Silvermont CPU
  - Integrated HSPA+ A-GOLD 620: 2G/3G RF, CNV, PMU, Audio (Atom x3-C3230RK)
- SoFIA LTE (W) with Airmont CPU (Announced, but never launched)
  - Integrated LTE Cat. 4 (XG726-based), SMARTi 4.5, LnP/ CG2000, PMIC (Atom x3-C3440 & C3445)

Model	sSpec number	Cores	Clock rate	Burst	L2 cache	GPU model	GPU frequency	Memory	Connectivity	TDP	SDP	Socket	Release date	Part number(s)	Release price (USD)
Atom x3-C3130		2	1.0 GHz	—N/a	512 KB	Mali 400 MP2 (dual core)	480 MHz	1×32 LPDDR2 800	2G/3G, GPS, Bluetooth, WiFi		2 W		H1 2015		
Atom x3-C3200RK	SLKZW; SLKYS; SLL4C	4		1.1 GHz	1 MB	Mali 450 MP4 (quad core)	600 MHz	1×32 LPDDR2/3 1066, 2×16 DDR3/DDR3L 1333	WiFi only		2 W		H1 2015	PMB8016.P10; PMB8016.P20; PMB8016.P10	
Atom x3-C3205RK	SLKYS	4		1.2 GHz	1 MB	Mali 450 MP4 (quad core)	600 MHz	1×32 LPDDR2/3 1066, 2×16 DDR3/DDR3L 1333	WiFi, Bluetooth, GPS		2 W	VF2BGA361	October 2016	PMB8016.P20	$5.60
Atom x3-C3230RK	SLKZQ; SLKYT; SLL4B	4		1.1 GHz	1 MB	Mali 450 MP4 (quad core)	600 MHz	1×32 LPDDR2/3 1066, 2×16 DDR3/DDR3L 1333	2G/3G, GPS, Bluetooth, WiFi		2 W		H1 2015	PMB8018.P10; PMB8018.P20; PMB8018.P10	
Atom x3-C3235RK		4		1.2 GHz	1 MB	Mali 450 MP4 (quad core)	600 MHz	1×32 LPDDR2/3 1066, 2×16 DDR3/DDR3L 1333	2G/3G, GPS, Bluetooth, WiFi		2 W	VF2BGA361	October 2016		
Atom x3-C3265RK	SLLUL (A1)	4		1.1 GHz	1 MB	Mali 450 MP4 (quad core)	600 MHz	1×32 LPDDR2/3 1066, 2×16 DDR3/DDR3L 1333	WiFi, Bluetooth, GPS		2 W		October 2016	PMB8016T.P20	$6.80
Atom x3-C3295RK	SLLUK (A1)	4		1.1 GHz	1 MB	Mali 450 MP4 (quad core)	600 MHz	1×32 LPDDR2/3 1066, 2×16 DDR3/DDR3L 1333	2G/3G, GPS, Bluetooth, WiFi		2 W	VF2BGA361	October 2016	PMB8018T.P20	
Atom x3-C3405		4	1.2 GHz	1.4 GHz	1 MB	Mali T720 MP2 (dual core)	456 MHz	1×32 LPDDR2/3 1066	WiFi only		2 W		H1 2015		(Never Launched)
Atom x3-C3445	SR2G0	4	1.2 GHz	1.4 GHz	1 MB	Mali T720 MP2 (dual core)	456 MHz	1×32 LPDDR2/3 1066	2G/3G/4G LTE, GPS, Bluetooth, WiFi		2 W		H1 2015	PMB8020.P20	(Never Launched)

== Tablet processors/SoCs ==
=== Bonnell microarchitecture ===
==== "Lincroft" (45 nm) ====
- All models support: MMX, SSE, SSE2, SSE3, SSSE3, Enhanced Intel SpeedStep Technology (EIST), XD bit (an NX bit implementation), Hyper-Threading. All except Z605 support Intel Burst Performance Technology (BPT).
- GMA 600 GPU and DDR2 single-channel memory controller are integrated onto the processor die
- Transistors: 140 million
- Die size: 7.34 mm × 8.89 mm = 65.2526 mm^{2}
- Package size: 13.8 mm × 13.8 × 1.0 mm
- Steppings: C0

Model	sSpec number	Cores	Clock rate	GPU frequency	L2 cache	I/O bus	Memory	Voltage	TDP	Socket	Release date	Part number(s)	Release price (USD)
Atom Z650	SLC2Q (C0)	1	1.2 GHz	400 MHz	512 KB	DMI	1 × DDR2-800	1.1125–1.5 V	3 W	FC-BGA 518	April 11, 2011	AY80609007296AA	
Atom Z670	SLC2P (C0)	1	1.5 GHz	400 MHz	512 KB	DMI	1 × DDR2-800	1.1125–1.5 V	3 W	FC-BGA 518	April 11, 2011	AY80609007293AA	$75

=== Saltwell microarchitecture ===
Intel Atom Z2760 Saltwell die shot

==== "Cloverview" (32 nm) ====
- All models support: MMX, SSE, SSE2, SSE3, SSSE3, Enhanced Intel SpeedStep Technology (EIST), XD bit (an NX bit implementation), Hyper-Threading, Intel Burst Performance Technology (BPT).
- GPU and memory controller are integrated onto the processor die
- Package size: 13.8 mm × 13.8 × 1.0 mm
- Steppings:B1, C0

Model	sSpec number	Cores	Clock rate	GPU frequency	L2 cache	I/O bus	Memory	Voltage	TDP	Socket	Release date	Part number(s)	Release price (USD)
Atom Z2520	SR161 (B1)	2	1.2 GHz	300 MHz	1 MB		2 × LPDDR2-1066	0.3–1.2 V			February 25, 2013	DG8065101533700	
Atom Z2560	SR145 (B1)	2	1.6 GHz	400 MHz	1 MB		2 × LPDDR2-1066	0.3–1.2 V			February 25, 2013	DG8065101274708	
Atom Z2580	SR12U (C0); SR12V (C0); SR146 (B1)	2	2.0 GHz	400 MHz	1 MB		2 × LPDDR2-1066	0.3–1.2 V		FC-MB4760	February 25, 2013	DG8065101418902; DG8065101418900	
Atom Z2760	SR0WW (C0); SR0Z4 (C0)	2	1.8 GHz	533 MHz	1 MB		2 × LPDDR2-800			FC-MB4760	September 27, 2012	DG8065001313500	$41

No official TDP available. For power data see page 129–130.

=== Silvermont microarchitecture ===
Intel Atom Z3735E Bay Trail (Silvermont) Die Shot

==== "Bay Trail-T" (22 nm) ====
- All models support: MMX, SSE, SSE2, SSE3, SSSE3, SSE4, Enhanced Intel SpeedStep Technology (EIST), Intel 64, XD bit (an NX bit implementation), Intel Burst Performance Technology (BPT), Intel VT-x, AES-NI, TXT/TXE
- Package size: 17 mm × 17 × 1.0 mm

Type 4 SoC:

- DDR3L single-channel or LPDDR3 dual-channel memory controller supporting up to 4 GB; ECC supported in single-channel mode
- Display controller with 2 MIPI DSI ports and 2 DDI ports (eDP 1.3, DP 1.1a, DVI, or HDMI 1.4a)
- Integrated Intel HD Graphics (Gen7) GPU
- One USB 3.0 controller supporting one USB 3.0 port (can be multiplexed to support four USB 2.0 ports)
- One USB 2.0 controller supporting four ports
- Integrated LPE audio controller
- Integrated image signal processor supporting two MIPI CSI ports, 24 MP sensors, and stereoscopic video
- Integrated memory card reader supporting SDIO 3.0, eMMC 4.51, and SDXC
- Serial I/O supporting SPI, UART (serial port), I2C or PWM

Type 3 SoC:

- DDR3L/L-RS single-channel memory controller supporting up to 2 GB
- Display controller with 1 MIPI DSI port and 2 DDI ports (HDMI 1.4)
- Integrated Intel HD Graphics (Gen7) GPU
- One USB controller supporting two USB 2.0 ports
- Integrated LPE audio controller
- Integrated image signal processor supporting two MIPI CSI ports and 8 MP sensors
- Integrated memory card reader supporting SDIO 3.0, eMMC 4.51, and SDXC
- Serial I/O supporting SPI, UART (serial port), I2C or PWM

Model	sSpec number	Cores	Clock rate	Burst	L2 cache	GPU model	GPU frequency	Memory	TDP	SDP	Socket	Release date	Part number(s)	Release price (USD)
Atom Z3680	SR1S2 (B3)	2	1.33 GHz	2 GHz	1 MB	Intel Graphics Technology (4 EUs)	311-667 MHz	2 × LPDDR3-1066	—N/a	2 W	UTFCBGA1380	September 2013	FH8065301455695	
Atom Z3680D	SR1S4 (B3)	2	1.33 GHz	2 GHz	1 MB	HD Graphics (4 EUs)	313-688 MHz	1 × DDR3L-1333	—N/a	2.2 W	UTFCBGA1380	September 2013	FH8065301574827	
Atom Z3735D	SR1U7 (C0)	4	1.33 GHz	1.83 GHz	2 MB	HD Graphics (4 EUs)	311-646 MHz	1 × DDR3L-1333 (64-bit)	—N/a	2.2 W	UTFCBGA1380	May 2014	FH8065301685597	
Atom Z3735E	SR1U9 (C0)	4	1.33 GHz	1.83 GHz	2 MB	HD Graphics (4 EUs)	311-646 MHz	1 × DDR3L-1333 (32-bit)	—N/a	2.2 W	UTFCBGA1380	May 2014	FH8065301685963	$21
Atom Z3735F	SR1UB (C0)	4	1.33 GHz	1.83 GHz	2 MB	HD Graphics (4 EUs)	311-646 MHz	1 × DDR3L-1333 (64-bit)	—N/a	2.2 W	UTFCBGA592	May 2014	FH8065301685598	$17
Atom Z3735G	SR1UD (C0)	4	1.33 GHz	1.83 GHz	2 MB	HD Graphics (4 EUs)	311-646 MHz	1 × DDR3L-1333 (32-bit)	—N/a	2.2 W	UTFCBGA592	May 2014	FH8065301685965	$17
Atom Z3736F	SR20D (C0)	4	1.33 GHz	2.16 GHz	2 MB	HD Graphics (4 EUs)	313-646 MHz	1 × DDR3L-1333 (64-bit)	—N/a	2.2 W	UTFCBGA592	July 2014	FH8065301685500	$20
Atom Z3736G	SR20E (C0)	4	1.33 GHz	2.16 GHz	2 MB	HD Graphics (4 EUs)	313-646 MHz	1 × DDR3L-1333 (32-bit)	—N/a	2.2 W	UTFCBGA592	July 2014	FH8065301685971	$20
Atom Z3740	SR1M5 (B2); SR1RW (B3)	4	1.33 GHz	1.86 GHz	2 MB	HD Graphics (4 EUs)	311-667 MHz	2 × LPDDR3-1066	—N/a	2 W	UTFCBGA1380	September 2013	FH8065301455601; FH8065301455693	$32
Atom Z3740D	SR1M9 (B2); SR1S0 (B3)	4	1.33 GHz	1.86 GHz	2 MB	HD Graphics (4 EUs)	313-688 MHz	1 × DDR3L-1333	—N/a	2.2 W	UTFCBGA1380	September 2013	FH8065301574801; FH8065301574825	$32
Atom Z3745	SR1SP (C0)	4	1.33 GHz	1.86 GHz	2 MB	HD Graphics (4 EUs)	311-778 MHz	2 × LPDDR3-1066	—N/a	2 W	UTFCBGA1380	May 2014	FH8065301455630	$30
Atom Z3745D	SR1ST (C0)	4	1.33 GHz	1.83 GHz	2 MB	HD Graphics (4 EUs)	311-792 MHz	1 × DDR3L-1333	—N/a	2.2 W	UTFCBGA1380	May 2014	FH8065301574844	
Atom Z3770	SR1M3 (B2); SR1RU (B3)	4	1.46 GHz	2.39 GHz	2 MB	HD Graphics (4 EUs)	311-667 MHz	2 × LPDDR3-1066	—N/a	2 W	UTFCBGA1380	September 2013	FH8065301455604; FH8065301455691	$37
Atom Z3770D	SR1M7 (B2); SR1RY (B3)	4	1.50 GHz	2.41 GHz	2 MB	HD Graphics (4 EUs)	313-688 MHz	1 × DDR3L-1333	—N/a	2.2 W	UTFCBGA1380	September 2013	FH8065301574800; FH8065301574823	$37
Atom Z3775	SR1SM (C0)	4	1.46 GHz	2.39 GHz	2 MB	HD Graphics (4 EUs)	311-778 MHz	2 × LPDDR3-1066	—N/a	2 W	UTFCBGA1380	May 2014	FH8065301455629	$35
Atom Z3775D	SR1SR (C0)	4	1.49 GHz	2.41 GHz	2 MB	HD Graphics (4 EUs)	311-792 MHz	1 × DDR3L-1333	—N/a	2.2 W	UTFCBGA1380	May 2014	FH8065301574843	$35
Atom Z3785	SR1V9 (C0)	4	1.49 GHz	2.41 GHz	2 MB	HD Graphics (4 EUs)	313-833 MHz	2 × LPDDR3-1333	—N/a	2.2 W	UTFCBGA1380	July 2014	FH8065301455637	
Atom Z3795	SR1SK (C0)	4	1.59 GHz	2.39 GHz	2 MB	HD Graphics (4 EUs)	311-778 MHz	2 × LPDDR3-1066	—N/a	2 W	UTFCBGA1380	May 2014	FH8065301455628	$40

=== Airmont microarchitecture ===
==== "Cherry Trail-T" (14 nm) ====
- All models support: MMX, SSE, SSE2, SSE3, SSSE3, SSE4, Enhanced Intel SpeedStep Technology (EIST), Intel 64, XD bit (an NX bit implementation), Intel VT-x2 (VT-x with EPT, FlexMigration, FlexPriority and VPID AES-NI., TXT/TXE
- Package size: 17 mm × 17 × 1.0 mm

Type 4 SoC:

- LPDDR3 dual-channel memory controller supporting up to 8 GB
- PCI Express 2.0 controller with 2 lanes
- Display controller with 2 MIPI DSI ports and 3 DDI ports (eDP 1.3, DP 1.1a, DVI, or HDMI 1.4b)
- Integrated Intel HD Graphics (Gen8) GPU
- One USB xHCI controller supporting three USB 3.0 ports, two SSCI ports, and two HSIC ports
- One USB xDCI controller supporting one USB 3.0 port
- Integrated LPE audio controller
- Integrated image signal processor supporting three MIPI CSI ports and 13 MP ZLS sensors
- Integrated memory card reader supporting SDIO 3.0, eMMC 4.51, and SDXC
- Serial I/O supporting SPI, UART (serial port), I2C or PWM

Type 3 SoC:

- DDR3L/L-RS single-channel memory controller supporting up to 2 GB
- PCI Express 2.0 controller with 1 lane
- Display controller with 2 MIPI DSI ports and 2 DDI ports (eDP 1.3, DP 1.1a, DVI, or HDMI 1.4b)
- Integrated Intel HD Graphics (Gen8) GPU
- One USB controller supporting three USB 2.0 ports and two HSIC ports
- Integrated LPE audio controller
- Integrated image signal processor supporting three MIPI CSI ports and 8 MP sensors
- Integrated memory card reader supporting SDIO 3.0, eMMC 4.51, and SDXC
- Serial I/O supporting SPI, UART (serial port), I2C or PWM

Model	sSpec number	Cores	Clock rate	Burst	L2 cache	GPU model	GPU frequency	Memory	TDP	SDP	Socket	Release date	Part number(s)	Release price (USD)
Atom x5-Z8300	SR29Z (C0)	4	1.44 GHz	1.84 GHz	2 MB	Intel Graphics Technology (12 EUs)	200-500 MHz	1 × DDR3L-1600	2.17 W	2 W	UTFCBGA592	March 2015	FJ8066401836609	$20
Atom x5-Z8330	SR2KU (D1)	4	1.44 GHz	1.92 GHz	2 MB	HD Graphics 400	200-500 MHz	1 × DDR3L-1600	2.17 W	2 W	UTFCBGA592	February 2016	FJ8066401836619	
Atom x5-Z8350	SR2KT (D1)	4	1.44 GHz	1.92 GHz	2 MB	HD Graphics (12 EUs)	200-500 MHz	1 × DDR3L-1600	2.17 W	2 W	UTFCBGA592	February 2016	FJ8066401836620	$21
Atom x5-Z8500	SR27N (C0); SR2GN (C0)	4	1.44 GHz	2.24 GHz	2 MB	HD Graphics (12 EUs)	200-600 MHz	2 × LPDDR3-1600	2.17 W	2 W	UTFCBGA1380	March 2015	FJ8066401715814; FJ8066401715842	$25
Atom x5-Z8550	SR2KH (D1)	4	1.44 GHz	2.4 GHz	2 MB	HD Graphics 400	200-600 MHz	2 × LPDDR3-1600	2.17 W	2 W	UTFCBGA1380	February 2016	FJ8066401715843	$27
Atom x7-Z8700	SR27M (C0); SR29W (C0)	4	1.60 GHz	2.4 GHz	2 MB	HD Graphics (16 EUs)	200-600 MHz	2 × LPDDR3-1600	2.17 W	2 W	UTFCBGA1380	March 2015	FJ8066401715809; FJ8066401715825	$35
Atom x7-Z8750	SR2KG (D1)	4	1.60 GHz	2.56 GHz	2 MB	HD Graphics (16 EUs)	200-600 MHz	2 × LPDDR3-1600	2.17 W	2 W	UTFCBGA1380	February 2016	FJ8066401715827	$37

== Embedded processors/SoCs ==
=== Bonnell microarchitecture ===
==== "Tunnel Creek" (45 nm) ====
- CPU core supports IA-32 architecture, MMX, SSE, SSE2, SSE3, SSSE3, Enhanced Intel SpeedStep Technology (EIST), hyper-threading, Intel VT-x.
- Package size: 22 mm × 22 mm
- Steppings: B0
- Temperature range: for (E620, E640, E660, E680): 0 °C to +70 °C, for (E620T, E640T, E660T, E680T): -40 °C to +85 °C.
- DDR2 single-channel memory controller supporting up to 2 GB
- PCI Express 1.0a controller with 4 lanes
- Display controller with LVDS and serial DVO ports
- Integrated GMA600 (PowerVR) GPU
- Integrated HD audio controller
- Serial I/O supporting SPI

Model	sSpec number	Cores	Clock rate	GPU frequency	L2 cache	I/O bus	Memory	Voltage	TDP	Socket	Release date	Part number(s)	Release price (USD)
Atom E620	SLH56 (B0); SLJ32 (B1)	1	600 MHz	320 MHz	512 KB	PCIe	1 × DDR2-800	0.8–1.175 V	3.3 W	FC-BGA 676	September 14, 2010	CT80618005844AA	$19
Atom E620T	SLH5N (B0); SLJ36 (B1)	1	600 MHz	320 MHz	512 KB	PCIe	1 × DDR2-800	0.8–1.175 V	3.3 W	FC-BGA 676	September 14, 2010	CT80618005844AB	$22
Atom E640	SLH55 (B0); SLJ33 (B1)	1	1 GHz	320 MHz	512 KB	PCIe	1 × DDR2-800	0.8–1.175 V	3.6 W	FC-BGA 676	September 14, 2010	CT80618005841AA	$29
Atom E640T	SLH5M (B0); SLJ37 (B1)	1	1 GHz	320 MHz	512 KB	PCIe	1 × DDR2-800	0.8–1.175 V	3.6 W	FC-BGA 676	September 14, 2010	CT80618005841AB	$37
Atom E660	SLH54 (B0); SLJ34 (B1)	1	1.3 GHz	400 MHz	512 KB	PCIe	1 × DDR2-800	0.8–1.175 V	3.6 W	FC-BGA 676	September 14, 2010	CT80618003201AA	$54
Atom E660T	SLH5L (B0); SLJ38 (B1)	1	1.3 GHz	400 MHz	512 KB	PCIe	1 × DDR2-800	0.8–1.175 V	3.6 W	FC-BGA 676	September 14, 2010	CT80618003201AB	$64
Atom E680	SLH94 (B0); SLJ35 (B1)	1	1.6 GHz	400 MHz	512 KB	PCIe	1 × DDR2-800	0.8–1.175 V	4.5 W	FC-BGA 676	September 14, 2010	CT80618007035AA	$74
Atom E680T	SLH95 (B0); SLJ39 (B1)	1	1.6 GHz	400 MHz	512 KB	PCIe	1 × DDR2-800	0.8–1.175 V	4.5 W	FC-BGA 676	September 14, 2010	CT80618007035AB	$85

==== "Stellarton" (45 nm) ====
- "Tunnel Creek" CPU with an Altera Field Programmable Gate Array (FPGA)
- CPU core supports IA-32 architecture, MMX, SSE, SSE2, SSE3, SSSE3, Enhanced Intel SpeedStep Technology (EIST), Hyper-Threading, Intel VT-x
- Package size: 37.5 mm × 37.5 mm
- Steppings: B0
- TDP without FPGA. Total package TDP depends on functions included in FPGA. Max. TDP 7 W.
- Temperature range: for (E625C, E645C, E665C): 0 °C to +70 °C, for (E625CT, E645CT, E665CT): -40 °C to +85 °C.
- DDR2 single-channel memory controller supporting up to 2 GB
- PCI Express 1.0a controller with 4 lanes
- Display controller with LVDS and serial DVO ports
- Integrated GMA600 (PowerVR) GPU
- Integrated HD audio controller
- Serial I/O supporting SPI

Model	sSpec number	Cores	Clock rate	GPU frequency	L2 cache	I/O bus	Memory	Voltage	TDP	Socket	Release date	Part number(s)	Release price (USD)
Atom E625C	SLH9Z (B0)	1	600 MHz	320 MHz	512 KB	PCIe	1 × DDR2-800	0.8–1.175 V	2.7 W	FC-BGA 1466	November 22, 2010	CY80632007227AB	$61
Atom E625CT	SLH9K (B0)	1	600 MHz	320 MHz	512 KB	PCIe	1 × DDR2-800	0.8–1.175 V	2.7 W	FC-BGA 1466	November 22, 2010	CY80632007227AA	$65
Atom E645C	SLH9Y (B0)	1	1 GHz	320 MHz	512 KB	PCIe	1 × DDR2-800	0.8–1.175 V	3.6 W	FC-BGA 1466	November 22, 2010	CY80632007221AB	$72
Atom E645CT	SLH9J (B0)	1	1 GHz	320 MHz	512 KB	PCIe	1 × DDR2-800	0.8–1.175 V	3.6 W	FC-BGA 1466	November 22, 2010	CY80632007221AA	$79
Atom E665C	SLH9X (B0)	1	1.3 GHz	400 MHz	512 KB	PCIe	1 × DDR2-800	0.8–1.175 V	3.6 W	FC-BGA 1466	November 22, 2010	CY80632007224AB	$97
Atom E665CT	SLH9H (B0)	1	1.3 GHz	400 MHz	512 KB	PCIe	1 × DDR2-800	0.8–1.175 V	3.6 W	FC-BGA 1466	November 22, 2010	CY80632007224AA	$106

=== Silvermont microarchitecture ===
==== "Bay Trail-I" (22 nm) ====
- All models support: MMX, SSE, SSE2, SSE3, SSSE3, Enhanced Intel SpeedStep Technology (EIST), Intel 64, XD bit (an NX bit implementation), Intel VT-x, AES-NI, TXT/TXE
- Package size: 25 mm × 27 mm
- DDR3L dual-channel memory controller supporting up to 4 GB; ECC supported in single-channel mode
- Display controller with 2 DDI ports (eDP 1.3, DP 1.1a, DVI, or HDMI 1.4a)
- Integrated Intel HD Graphics (Gen7) GPU
- PCI Express 2.0 controller with four lanes and four root ports
- Two SATA-300 ports
- One USB 3.0 controller supporting one USB 3.0 port (can be multiplexed to support four USB 2.0 ports)
- One USB 2.0 controller supporting four ports
- Integrated LPE and HD audio controllers
- Integrated image signal processor supporting three MIPI CSI ports, 24 MP sensors, and stereoscopic video
- Integrated memory card reader supporting SDIO 3.0, eMMC 4.5, and SDXC
- Serial I/O supporting SPI, UART (serial port), I2C or PWM

Model	sSpec number	Cores	Clock rate	Burst	L2 cache	GPU model	GPU frequency	Memory	TDP	SDP	Socket	Release date	Part number(s)	Release price (USD)
Atom E3805	SR20Y (D0); SR2UL (D0); SR3V4 (D1); SR3V3 (D1)	2	1.33 GHz	—N/a	1 MB	—N/a	—N/a	1 × DDR3L-1066	3 W	—N/a	FC-BGA 1170	October 2014	FH8065301989700; FH8065301989701; FH8065301989701; FH8065301989701	$31
Atom E3815	SR1RA (B3); SR1XA (D0); SR2UK (D0); SR3V2 (D1); SR3V1 (D1)	1	1.46 GHz	—N/a	512 KB	HD Graphics (4 EUs)	400 MHz	1 × DDR3L-1066	5 W	—N/a	FC-BGA 1170	October 2013	FH8065301567411; FH8065301567414; FH8065301567416; FH8065301567416; FH8065301567416	$31
Atom E3825	SR1RB (B3); SR1X9 (D0); SR2UJ (D0); SR3V0 (D1); SR3UZ (D1)	2	1.33 GHz	—N/a	1 MB	HD Graphics (4 EUs)	533 MHz	1 × DDR3L-1066	6 W	—N/a	FC-BGA 1170	October 2013	FH8065301567311; FH8065301567313; FH8065301567315; FH8065301567315; FH8065301567315	$34
Atom E3826	SR1RC (B3); SR1X8 (D0); SR2UG (D0); SR3UW (D1); SR3UX (D1)	2	1.46 GHz	—N/a	1 MB	HD Graphics (4 EUs)	533-667 MHz	2 × DDR3L-1066	7 W	—N/a	FC-BGA 1170	October 2013	FH8065301542213; FH8065301542215; FH8065301542217; FH8065301542217; FH8065301542217	$37
Atom E3827	SR1RD (B3); SR1X7 (D0); SR2UH (D0); SR3UY (D1); SR3UV (D1)	2	1.75 GHz	—N/a	1 MB	HD Graphics (4 EUs)	542-792 MHz	2 × DDR3L-1333	8 W	—N/a	FC-BGA 1170	October 2013	FH8065301487916; FH8065301487918; FH8065301487920; FH8065301487920; FH8065301487920	$41
Atom E3845	SR1RE (B3); SR1X6 (D0); SR2UF (D0); SR3UU (D1); SR3UT (D1)	4	1.91 GHz	—N/a	2 MB	HD Graphics (4 EUs)	542-792 MHz	1 × DDR3L-1333	10 W	—N/a	FC-BGA 1170	October 2013	FH8065301487715; FH8065301487717; FH8065301487719; FH8065301487719; FH8065301487719	$52

=== Airmont microarchitecture ===
==== "Braswell" (14 nm) ====
- All models support: MMX, SSE, SSE2, SSE3, SSSE3, SSE4.1, SSE4.2, Enhanced Intel SpeedStep Technology (EIST), Intel 64, XD bit (an NX bit implementation), Intel VT-x, AES-NI.
- GPU and memory controller are integrated onto the processor die
- GPU is based on Broadwell Intel HD Graphics, with 12 execution units, and supports DirectX 11.2, OpenGL 4.3, OpenGL ES 3.0 and OpenCL 1.2 (on Windows).
- Package size: 25 mm × 27 mm

Model	sSpec number	Cores	Clock rate	Burst	L2 cache	GPU model	GPU frequency	Memory	TDP	SDP	Socket	Release date	Part number(s)	Release price (USD)
Atom x5-E8000	SR2LV (D1)	4	1.04 GHz	2.0 GHz	2 MB	Intel Graphics Technology (12 EUs)	320 MHz	2 × DDR3L-1600	5 W	—N/a	FC-BGA 1170	January 2016	FH8066501715946	$39

=== Goldmont microarchitecture ===
==== "Apollo Lake" (14 nm) ====
- All models support: MMX, SSE, SSE2, SSE3, SSSE3, SSE4.1, SSE4.2, Enhanced Intel SpeedStep Technology (EIST), Intel 64, XD bit (an NX bit implementation), Intel VT-x, Intel VT-d, AES-NI, TXT/TXE
- Package size: 24 mm × 31 mm
- DDR3L/LPDDR3/LPDDR4 dual-channel memory controller supporting up to 8 GB; support for DDR3L with ECC
- Display controller with 1 MIPI DSI port and 2 DDI ports (eDP 1.3, DP 1.1a, or HDMI 1.4b)
- Integrated Intel HD Graphics (Gen9) GPU
- PCI Express 2.0 controller supporting 6 lanes (3 dedicated and 3 multiplexed with USB 3.0); 4 lanes available externally
- Two USB 3.0 ports (1 dual role, 1 dedicated, 3 multiplexed with PCI Express 2.0 and 1 multiplexed with one SATA-300 port)
- Two USB 2.0 ports
- Two SATA-600 ports (one multiplexed with USB 3.0)
- Integrated HD audio controller
- Integrated image signal processor supporting four MIPI CSI ports and 13 MP sensors
- Integrated memory card reader supporting SDIO 3.01 and eMMC 5.0
- Serial I/O supporting SPI, HSUART (serial port) and I2C

Model	sSpec number	Cores	Clock rate	Burst	L2 cache	GPU model	GPU frequency	Memory	TDP	SDP	Socket	Release date	Part number(s)	Release price (USD)
Atom x5-E3930	SR33Q (B1); SREKA (F1)	2	1.3 GHz	1.8 GHz	2 MB	HD Graphics 500	400–550 MHz	4 × DDR3L-1866; 4 × LPDDR4-2133	6.5 W	—N/a	FC-BGA 1296	October 2016	LH8066803102701	$34
Atom x5-E3940	SR33M (B1); SREK6 (F1)	4	1.6 GHz	1.8 GHz	2 MB	HD Graphics 500	400–600 MHz	4 × DDR3L-1866; 4 × LPDDR4-2133	9.5 W	—N/a	FC-BGA 1296	October 2016	LH8066803102401	$42
Atom x7-E3950	SR33P (B1); SREK9 (F1)	4	1.6 GHz	2 GHz	2 MB	HD Graphics 505	500–650 MHz	4 × DDR3L-1866; 4 × LPDDR4-2400	12 W	—N/a	FC-BGA 1296	October 2016	LH8066803102601	$57

=== Tremont microarchitecture ===
==== "Elkhart Lake" (10 nm) ====
- All models support: MMX, SSE, SSE2, SSE3, SSSE3, SSE4.1, SSE4.2, Intel 64, XD bit (an NX bit implementation), Intel VT-x, Intel VT-d, AES-NI.
- GPU is based on Gen11 Intel HD Graphics, with up to 32 execution units, and supports up to 3 displays (4K @ 60 Hz) through HDMI, DP, eDP, or DSI.
- SoC peripherals include 4 × USB 2.0/3.0/3.1, 2 × SATA, 3 × 2.5GbE LAN, UART, and up to 8 lanes of PCI Express 3.0 in x4, x2, and x1 configurations.
- Package size: 35 mm × 24 mm

Model	sSpec number	Cores	Clock rate	Burst	L2 cache	GPU model	GPU frequency	Memory	TDP	SDP	Socket	Release date	Part number(s)	Release price (USD)
Atom x6200FE	SRKST (B1)	2	1.0 GHz	—N/a	1 MB	—N/a	—N/a	4 × LPDDR4X-4267; 2 × DDR4-3200	4.5 W	—N/a	FC-BGA 1493	Q1 2021	FH8070304289582	$37
Atom x6211E	SRKUD (B1)	2	1.2 GHz	3.0 GHz	1.5 MB	UHD Graphics (16 EUs)	350–750 MHz	4 × LPDDR4X-4267; 2 × DDR4-3200	6 W	—N/a	FC-BGA 1493	Q1 2021	FH8070304243807	$35
Atom x6212RE	SRKLE (B1)	2	1.2 GHz	—N/a	1.5 MB	UHD Graphics (16 EUs)	350 MHz	4 × LPDDR4X-4267; 2 × DDR4-3200	6 W	—N/a	FC-BGA 1493	Q1 2021	FH8070304289568	$37
Atom x6413E	SRKLC (B1)	4	1.5 GHz	3.0 GHz	1.5 MB	UHD Graphics (16 EUs)	500–750 MHz	4 × LPDDR4X-4267; 2 × DDR4-3200	9 W	—N/a	FC-BGA 1493	Q1 2021	FH8070304243865	$43
Atom x6414RE	SRKLF (B1)	4	1.5 GHz	—N/a	1.5 MB	UHD Graphics (16 EUs)	400 MHz	4 × LPDDR4X-4267; 2 × DDR4-3200	9 W	—N/a	FC-BGA 1493	Q1 2021	FH8070304289591	$46
Atom x6425E	SRKUE (B1)	4	1.8 GHz	3.0 GHz	1.5 MB	UHD Graphics (32 EUs)	500–750 MHz	4 × LPDDR4X-4267; 2 × DDR4-3200	12 W	—N/a	FC-BGA 1493	Q1 2021	FH8070304243808	$56
Atom x6425RE	SRKLG (B1)	4	1.9 GHz	—N/a	1.5 MB	UHD Graphics (32 EUs)	400 MHz	4 × LPDDR4X-4267; 2 × DDR4-3200	12 W	—N/a	FC-BGA 1493	Q1 2021	FH8070304289558	$59
Atom x6427FE	SRKLH (B1)	4	1.9 GHz	—N/a	1.5 MB	UHD Graphics (32 EUs)	400 MHz	4 × LPDDR4X-4267; 2 × DDR4-3200	12 W	—N/a	FC-BGA 1493	Q1 2021	FH8070304289690	$70

=== Gracemont microarchitecture ===
==== "Amston Lake" (7 nm) ====
In Q2 2024 Intel launched these cpus: Atom® x7203C, Atom® x7211RE, Atom® x7213RE, Atom® x7405C, Atom® x7433RE, Atom® x7809C, Atom® x7835RE. These processors have 2-8 cpu cores and use 6-25 watts of power.

== Server SoCs ==
All Atom server processors include ECC support.

=== Saltwell microarchitecture ===
==== "Centerton" (32 nm) ====
- All models support: MMX, SSE, SSE2, SSE3, SSSE3, Hyper-threading, Intel 64, Intel VT-x, ECC memory.

Model	sSpec number	Cores	Clock rate	GPU frequency	L2 cache	I/O bus	Memory	Voltage	TDP	Socket	Release date	Part number(s)	Release price (USD)
Atom S1220	SLK2K (B1)	2	1.6 GHz	—N/a	2 × 512 KB	8 × PCIe 2.0	DDR3-1333		8.1 W	FC-BGA 1283	December 11, 2012	DH80S1220	$54
Atom S1240	SLK2J (B1)	2	1.6 GHz	—N/a	2 × 512 KB	8 × PCIe 2.0	DDR3-1333		6.1 W	FC-BGA 1283	December 11, 2012	DH80S1240	$64
Atom S1260	SLK2H (B1)	2	2.0 GHz	—N/a	2 × 512 KB	8 × PCIe 2.0	DDR3-1333		8.5 W	FC-BGA 1283	December 11, 2012	DH80S1260	$64

==== "Briarwood" (32 nm) ====
- All models support: MMX, SSE, SSE2, SSE3, SSSE3, Hyper-threading, Intel 64, Intel VT-x, ECC memory.

Model	sSpec number	Cores	Clock rate	GPU frequency	L2 cache	I/O bus	Memory	Voltage	TDP	Socket	Release date	Part number(s)	Release price (USD)
Atom S1269	SLK2G (B1)	2	1.6 GHz	—N/a	2 × 512 KB	32 × PCIe 2.0	DDR3-1333		11.7 W	FC-BGA 1283	Q2 2013	DH80S1269	$80
Atom S1279	SLK2F (B1)	2	1.6 GHz	—N/a	2 × 512 KB	40 × PCIe 2.0	DDR3-1333		13.1 W	FC-BGA 1283	Q2 2013	DH80S1279	$103
Atom S1289	SLK2E (B1)	2	2.0 GHz	—N/a	2 × 512 KB	40 × PCIe 2.0	DDR3-1333		14.1 W	FC-BGA 1283	Q2 2013	DH80S1289	$120

=== Silvermont microarchitecture ===
==== "Avoton" (22 nm) ====
- All models support: MMX, SSE, SSE2, SSE3, SSSE3, SSE4.1, SSE4.2, Enhanced Intel SpeedStep Technology (EIST), Intel Turbo Boost, Intel 64 (according to Datasheet), XD bit (an NX bit implementation), Intel VT-x, AES-NI, ECC memory.
- Dual-core SoC peripherals include 4 × USB 2.0, 2 × SATA, 2 × Integrated GbE LAN, 2 × UART, and 4 lanes of PCI Express 2.0, in x4, x2, and x1 configurations.
- Quad-core SoC peripherals include 4 × USB 2.0, 2 (C2530) or 6 (C2550) × SATA, 2 × Integrated GbE LAN, 2 × UART, and 8 lanes of PCI Express 2.0, in x8, x4, x2, and x1 configurations.
- C2730 SoC peripherals include 4 × USB 2.0, 2 × SATA, 2 × Integrated GbE LAN, 2 × UART, and 8 lanes of PCI Express 2.0, in x8, x4, x2, and x1 configurations.
- C2750 SoC peripherals include 4 × USB 2.0, 6 × SATA, 4 × Integrated GbE LAN, 2 × UART, and 16 lanes of PCI Express 2.0, in x16, x8, x4, x2, and x1 configurations.
- Package size: 34 mm × 28 mm
- Die size: 107 mm^{2}

Model	sSpec number	Cores	Clock rate	GPU frequency	L2 cache	I/O bus	Memory	Voltage	TDP	Socket	Release date	Part number(s)	Release price (USD)
Atom C2350	SR1CV (B0); SR3GU (C0)	2	1.7-2.0 GHz	—N/a	1 MB	4 × PCIe 2.0	DDR3/3L-1333		6 W	FC-BGA 1283	September 2013	FH8065401488914; FH8065403552901	$43
Atom C2530	SR1CU (B0); SR3GT (C0)	4	1.7-2.0 GHz	—N/a	2 × 1 MB	8 × PCIe 2.0	DDR3/3L-1333		9 W	FC-BGA 1283	September 2013	FH8065401488915; FH8065403552801	$70
Atom C2550	SR1CT (B0); SR3GS (C0)	4	2.4-2.6 GHz	—N/a	2 × 1 MB	8 × PCIe 2.0	DDR3/3L-1600		14 W	FC-BGA 1283	September 2013	FH8065401488912; FH8065403552700	$86
Atom C2730	SR1CR (B0); SR3GQ (C0)	8	1.7-2.0 GHz	—N/a	4 × 1 MB	8 × PCIe 2.0	DDR3/3L-1333		12 W	FC-BGA 1283	September 2013	FH8065401488919; FH8065403552500	$150
Atom C2750	SR1CS (B0); SR3GR (C0)	8	2.4-2.6 GHz	—N/a	4 × 1 MB	16 × PCIe 2.0	DDR3/3L-1600		20 W	FC-BGA 1283	September 2013	FH8065401488906; FH8065403552600	$171

==== "Rangeley" (22 nm) ====
- All models support: MMX, SSE, SSE2, SSE3, SSSE3, SSE4.1, SSE4.2, Enhanced Intel SpeedStep Technology (EIST), Intel Turbo Boost, Intel 64, XD bit (an NX bit implementation), Intel VT-x, AES-NI, ECC memory.
- All models except C2x38 support Intel QuickAssist Technology (QAT, cryptography accelerator)
- SoC peripherals include 4 × USB 2.0, 4-6 × SATA (1 for C2308, 2 for C2316, C2508, C2516), 4 × Integrated GbE LAN (2 for C2316), 2 × UART, and 8-16 lanes of PCI Express 2.0 (4 lanes for C2308), in x16, x8, x4, x2, and x1 configurations.
- Package size: 34 mm × 28 mm

Model	sSpec number	Cores	Clock rate	GPU frequency	L2 cache	I/O bus	Memory	Voltage	TDP	Socket	Release date	Part number(s)	Release price (USD)
Atom C2308	SR1UN (B0); SR3H3 (C0)	2	1.25 GHz	—N/a	1 MB	4 × PCIe 2.0	DDR3-1333		6 W	FC-BGA 1283	March 2014	FH8065501516754; FH8065503553800	$60
Atom C2316	SR3JU (C0)	2	1.5 GHz	—N/a	1 MB	8 × PCIe 2.0	DDR3-1333		7 W	FC-BGA 1283	July 2017	FH8065503680000	$39
Atom C2338	SR1S8 (B0); SR3H2 (C0)	2	1.7-2.0 GHz	—N/a	1 MB	8 × PCIe 2.0	DDR3/3L-1333		7 W	FC-BGA 1283	September 2013	FH8065501516761; FH8065503553701	$60
Atom C2358	SR1D2 (B0); SR3H1 (C0)	2	1.7-2.0 GHz	—N/a	1 MB	8 × PCIe 2.0	DDR3/3L-1333		7 W	FC-BGA 1283	September 2013	FH8065501516711; FH8065503553601	$60
Atom C2508	SR1VV (B0); SR3H4 (C0)	4	1.25 GHz	—N/a	2 × 1 MB	8 × PCIe 2.0	DDR3-1333		9.5 W	FC-BGA 1283	March 2014	FH8065501516768; FH8065503554000	$98
Atom C2516	SR3JV (C0)	4	1.4 GHz	—N/a	2 × 1 MB	8 × PCIe 2.0	DDR3-1333		10 W	FC-BGA 1283	July 2017	FH8065503680100	$64
Atom C2518	SR1D1 (B0); SR3H0 (C0)	4	1.70 GHz	—N/a	2 × 1 MB	16 × PCIe 2.0	DDR3/3L-1333		13 W	FC-BGA 1283	September 2013	FH8065501516710; FH8065503553501	$91
Atom C2538	SR1S9 (B0); SR3GZ (C0)	4	2.40 GHz	—N/a	2 × 1 MB	16 × PCIe 2.0	DDR3/3L-1600		15 W	FC-BGA 1283	September 2013	FH8065501516762; FH8065503553400	$104
Atom C2558	SR1CZ (B0); SR3GX (C0)	4	2.4 GHz	—N/a	2 × 1 MB	16 × PCIe 2.0	DDR3/3L-1600		15 W	FC-BGA 1283	September 2013	FH8065501516709; FH8065503553200	$104
Atom C2718	SR1CY (B0); SR3GY (C0)	8	2.0 GHz	—N/a	4 × 1 MB	16 × PCIe 2.0	DDR3/3L-1333		18 W	FC-BGA 1283	September 2013	FH8065501516708; FH8065503553300	$182
Atom C2738	SR1SA (B0); SR3GW (C0)	8	2.4 GHz	—N/a	4 × 1 MB	16 × PCIe 2.0	DDR3/3L-1600		20 W	FC-BGA 1283	September 2013	FH8065501516763; FH8065503553100	$208
Atom C2758	SR1CW (B0); SR3GV (C0)	8	2.4 GHz	—N/a	4 × 1 MB	16 × PCIe 2.0	DDR3/3L-1600		20 W	FC-BGA 1283	September 2013	FH8065501516702; FH8065503553000	$208

=== Goldmont microarchitecture ===
==== "Denverton" (14 nm) ====
- All models support: MMX, SSE, SSE2, SSE3, SSSE3, SSE4.1, SSE4.2, Enhanced Intel SpeedStep Technology (EIST), Intel Turbo Boost (dual-core, C3xx0, C3xx5 only), Intel 64, XD bit (an NX bit implementation), Intel VT-x, Intel VT-d, AES-NI, ECC memory.
- SoC peripherals include 8–16 × USB 3.0, 6–16 × SATA, 4 × Integrated 1GbE, 2.5GbE, and 10GbE (C3538 and up) LAN, and up to 20 lanes of PCI Express 3.0, in x8, x4, and x2 configurations.
- Package size: 34 mm × 28 mm

Model	sSpec number	Cores	Clock rate	GPU frequency	L2 cache	I/O bus	Memory	Voltage	TDP	Socket	Release date	Part number(s)	Release price (USD)
Atom C3308	SR38D (B1)	2	1.6-2.1 GHz	—N/a	4 MB	6 × PCIe 3.0	1 × DDR4-1866; 1 × DDR3L-1600		9.5 W	FC-BGA 1310	August 2017	HW8076502639802	$32
Atom C3336	SRCZL (B1)	2	1.5 GHz	—N/a	4 MB	10 × PCIe 3.0	1 × DDR4-1866; 1 × DDR3L-1600		11 W	FC-BGA 1310	September 2018	HW8076504087602	$36
Atom C3338	SR36E (B0); SR38B (B1)	2	1.5-2.2 GHz	—N/a	4 MB	10 × PCIe 3.0	1 × DDR4-1866; 1 × DDR3L-1600		8.5 W	FC-BGA 1310	January 2017	HW8076502639602	$27
Atom C3338R	SRH4E (B1)	2	1.8-2.2 GHz	—N/a	4 MB	10 × PCIe 3.0	1 × DDR4-1866		10.5 W	FC-BGA 1310	May 2020	HW8076504489901	$37
Atom C3436L	SRJQN (B1)	4	1.3 GHz	—N/a	8 MB	10 × PCIe 3.0	1 × DDR4-1866		10.75 W	FC-BGA 1310	May 2020	HW8076504511101	$64
Atom C3508	SR3JX (B1)	4	1.6 GHz	—N/a	8 MB	8 × PCIe 3.0	2 × DDR4-1866; 2 × DDR3L-1600		11.5 W	FC-BGA 1310	August 2017	HW8076503693501	$86
Atom C3538	SR3L7 (B1)	4	2.1 GHz	—N/a	8 MB	12 × PCIe 3.0	2 × DDR4-2133; 2 × DDR3L-1600		15 W	FC-BGA 1310	August 2017	HW8076502444301	$75
Atom C3558	SR388 (B1)	4	2.2 GHz	—N/a	8 MB	12 × PCIe 3.0	2 × DDR4-2133; 2 × DDR3L-1600		16 W	FC-BGA 1310	August 2017	HW8076502639302	$86
Atom C3558R	SRH4G (B1)	4	2.4 GHz	—N/a	8 MB	20 × PCIe 3.0	2 × DDR4-2400		17 W	FC-BGA 1310	May 2020	HW8076504490101	$96
Atom C3708	SR38F (B1)	8	1.7 GHz	—N/a	16 MB	16 × PCIe 3.0	2 × DDR4-2133; 2 × DDR3L-1600		17 W	FC-BGA 1310	August 2017	HW8076502640002	$209
Atom C3750	SR385 (B1)	8	2.2-2.4 GHz	—N/a	16 MB	12 × PCIe 3.0	2 × DDR4-2133; 2 × DDR3L-1600		21 W	FC-BGA 1310	August 2017	HW8076502639002	$171
Atom C3758	SR389 (B1)	8	2.2 GHz	—N/a	16 MB	16 × PCIe 3.0	2 × DDR4-2400; 2 × DDR3L-1600		25 W	FC-BGA 1310	August 2017	HW8076502639402	$193
Atom C3758R	SRH4F (B1)	8	2.4 GHz	—N/a	16 MB	20 × PCIe 3.0	2 × DDR4-2400		26 W	FC-BGA 1310	May 2020	HW8076504490001	$209
Atom C3808	SR38C (B1)	12	2.0 GHz	—N/a	12 MB	16 × PCIe 3.0	2 × DDR4-2133; 2 × DDR3L-1600		25 W	FC-BGA 1310	August 2017	HW8076502639702	$369
Atom C3830	SR386 (B1)	12	1.9-2.3 GHz	—N/a	12 MB	12 × PCIe 3.0	2 × DDR4-2133; 2 × DDR3L-1600		21 W	FC-BGA 1310	August 2017	HW8076502639101	$289
Atom C3850	SR387 (B1)	12	2.1-2.4 GHz	—N/a	12 MB	16 × PCIe 3.0	2 × DDR4-2400; 2 × DDR3L-1600		25 W	FC-BGA 1310	August 2017	HW8076502639201	$323
Atom C3858	SR38A (B1)	12	2.0 GHz	—N/a	12 MB	16 × PCIe 3.0	2 × DDR4-2400; 2 × DDR3L-1600		25 W	FC-BGA 1310	August 2017	HW8076502639501	$332
Atom C3950	SR383 (B1)	16	1.7-2.2 GHz	—N/a	16 MB	16 × PCIe 3.0	2 × DDR4-2400; 2 × DDR3L-1600		24 W	FC-BGA 1310	August 2017	HW8076502638901	$389
Atom C3955	SR3F3 (B1)	16	2.1-2.4 GHz	—N/a	16 MB	16 × PCIe 3.0	2 × DDR4-2400; 2 × DDR3L-1600		32 W	FC-BGA 1310	August 2017	HW8076503528301	$434
Atom C3958	SR381 (B1)	16	2.0 GHz	—N/a	16 MB	16 × PCIe 3.0	2 × DDR4-2400; 2 × DDR3L-1600		31 W	FC-BGA 1310	August 2017	HW8076502444202	$449

=== Tremont microarchitecture ===
==== "Snow Ridge" (10 nm) ====
- All models support: MMX, SSE, SSE2, SSE3, SSSE3, SSE4.1, SSE4.2, Intel 64, XD bit (an NX bit implementation), Intel VT-x, AES-NI, ECC memory.
- Same frequency for all models: 2.2 GHz. L2 cache: 4.5 MB per module; each module comprises four CPU cores.
- SoC peripherals include 4 × USB 3.0, 4 × USB 2.0, 16 × SATA, Integrated Intel Ethernet 800 series 100 Gbit/s LAN, 3 × UART, and up to 32 lanes of PCI Express (16 × 2.0, 16 × 3.0), in x16, x8, and x4 configurations.
- Intel Dynamic Load Balancer (Intel DLB) & Intel QuickAssist Technology (Intel QAT)
- P####B models are designed for base transceiver stations, especially that for 5G networks. All other models are designed for communications (extended temperature range).
- Package size: 47.5 mm × 47.5 mm

Model	sSpec number	Cores	Clock rate	GPU frequency	L2 cache	I/O bus	Memory	Voltage	TDP	Socket	Release date	Part number(s)	Release price (USD)
Atom P5322	SRL3R (C0)	8	2.2 GHz	—N/a	9 MB	16 × PCIe 2.0; 16 × PCIe 3.0	2 × DDR4-2400		55 W		June 2022	NN8069204099502	$352
Atom P5332	SRL3S (C0)	12	2.2 GHz	—N/a	13.5 MB	16 × PCIe 2.0; 16 × PCIe 3.0	2 × DDR4-2400		61 W		June 2022	NN8069204099603	$448
Atom P5342	SRL3T (C0)	16	2.2 GHz	—N/a	18 MB	16 × PCIe 2.0; 16 × PCIe 3.0	2 × DDR4-2667		71 W		June 2022	NN8069204099703	$632
Atom P5352	SRL3U (C0)	20	2.2 GHz	—N/a	22.5 MB	16 × PCIe 2.0; 16 × PCIe 3.0	2 × DDR4-2933		78 W		June 2022	NN8069204099802	$654
Atom P5362	SRL3V (C0)	24	2.2 GHz	—N/a	27 MB	16 × PCIe 2.0; 16 × PCIe 3.0	2 × DDR4-2933		83 W		June 2022	NN8069204099904	$708
Atom P5721	SRL7K (C0)	8	2.2 GHz	—N/a	9 MB	16 × PCIe 2.0; 16 × PCIe 3.0	2 × DDR4-2933		48 W		June 2022	NN8069204099002	$392
Atom P5731	SRL7L (C0)	12	2.2 GHz	—N/a	13.5 MB	16 × PCIe 2.0; 16 × PCIe 3.0	2 × DDR4-2933		54.5 W		June 2022	NN8069204099102	$561
Atom P5742	SRL7M (C0)	16	2.2 GHz	—N/a	18 MB	16 × PCIe 2.0; 16 × PCIe 3.0	2 × DDR4-2933		67 W		June 2022	NN8069204099202	$752
Atom P5752	SRL7N (C0)	20	2.2 GHz	—N/a	22.5 MB	16 × PCIe 2.0; 16 × PCIe 3.0	2 × DDR4-2933		74.5 W		June 2022	NN8069204099302	$763
Atom P5921B		8	2.2 GHz	—N/a	9 MB	16 × PCIe 2.0; 16 × PCIe 3.0	1 × DDR4-2933				February 2020		
Atom P5931B		12	2.2 GHz	—N/a	13.5 MB	16 × PCIe 2.0; 16 × PCIe 3.0	2 × DDR4-2933				February 2020		
Atom P5942B		16	2.2 GHz	—N/a	18 MB	16 × PCIe 2.0; 16 × PCIe 3.0	2 × DDR4-2933				February 2020		
Atom P5962B		24	2.2 GHz	—N/a	27 MB	16 × PCIe 2.0; 16 × PCIe 3.0	2 × DDR4-2933				February 2020		

==== "Parker Ridge" (10 nm) ====
- All models support: MMX, SSE, SSE2, SSE3, SSSE3, SSE4.1, SSE4.2, Intel 64, XD bit (an NX bit implementation), Intel VT-x, AES-NI, ECC memory.
- SoC peripherals include 4 × USB 3.0, 4 × USB 2.0, 16 × SATA, Integrated Intel Ethernet 800 series 100 Gbit/s LAN (except 51xx model numbers), 3 × UART, and up to 32 lanes of PCI Express (16 × 2.0, 16 × 3.0), in x16, x8, and x4 configurations.
- Intel Dynamic Load Balancer (Intel DLB) & Intel QuickAssist Technology (Intel QAT)
- Model numbers ending in 0 are extended temperature range; model numbers ending in 5 are commercial temperature range.
- Package size: 47.5 mm × 47.5 mm

Model	sSpec number	Cores	Clock rate	GPU frequency	L2 cache	I/O bus	Memory	Voltage	TDP	Socket	Release date	Part number(s)	Release price (USD)
Atom C5115	SRL41 (C0)	4	2.8 GHz	—N/a	9 MB	16 × PCIe 2.0; 16 × PCIe 3.0	2 × DDR4-2933		43 W		June 2022	NN8071904626411	$213
Atom C5125	SRL40 (C0)	8	2.8 GHz	—N/a	9 MB	16 × PCIe 2.0; 16 × PCIe 3.0	2 × DDR4-2933		50 W		June 2022	NN8071904626418	$299
Atom C5310	SRL3Z (C0)	4	1.6 GHz	—N/a	9 MB	12 × PCIe 3.0	2 × DDR4-2400		32 W		June 2022	NN8071904626417	$213
Atom C5315	SRL3Y (C0)	4	2.4 GHz	—N/a	9 MB	12 × PCIe 3.0	2 × DDR4-2400		38 W		June 2022	NN8071904626414	$213
Atom C5320	SRL3X (C0)	8	2.4 GHz	—N/a	9 MB	16 × PCIe 3.0	2 × DDR4-2933		41 W		June 2022	NN8071904626416	$320
Atom C5325	SRL3W (C0)	8	2.4 GHz	—N/a	9 MB	16 × PCIe 3.0	2 × DDR4-2933		41 W		June 2022	NN8071904626413	$299

== CE SoCs ==
=== Single-core CE SoCs ===
==== "Sodaville" (45 nm) ====
- Package size: 27 mm × 27 mm
- GPU (based on the PowerVR SGX535 from Imagination Technologies)

Model	sSpec number	Cores	Clock rate	GPU frequency	L2 cache	I/O bus	Memory	Voltage	TDP	Socket	Release date	Part number(s)	Release price (USD)
Atom CE4105	SLJDS		800 MHz	400 MHz	512 KB					FC-BGA 951		CLCE4105S4	
Atom CE4110	SLH8H; SLHAP; SLHBS; SLJQ8; SLJQC; SLJQG; SLH8N; SLHAQ		1200 MHz	200 MHz	512 KB				7 W	FC-BGA 951	September 24, 2009	CLCE4110S2; CLCE4110ES2; CLCE4110DS2; CLCE4110ES4; CLCE4110S4; CLCE4110EDS1; CLCE4110DS2; CLCE4110EDS2	
Atom CE4130	SLJ4T		1200 MHz	200 MHz	512 KB				7 W	FC-BGA 951		CLCE4130ES1	
Atom CE4150	SLH8L; SLHAR; SLJDT; SLJQB; SLJTJ; SLHAS; SLH8T; SLH78		1200 MHz	400 MHz	512 KB				7 W	FC-BGA 951		CLCE4150EDS3; CLCE4150S2; CLCE4150EDS4; CLCE4150S4; CLCE4150S4; CLCE4150DS2; CLCE4150EDS3; CLCE4150ES4	
Atom CE4157	SLJJ4		1200 MHz	400 MHz	512 KB					FC-BGA 951		CLCE4157DS2	
Atom CE4160	SLJ2N		1600 MHz	400 MHz	512 KB					FC-BGA 951		CLCE4160DS2	
Atom CE4170			1600 MHz	400 MHz	512 KB					FC-BGA 951			
Atom CE4177	SLHBU		1600 MHz	400 MHz	512 KB					FC-BGA 951		CLCE4177S2	

==== "Groveland" (45 nm) ====
CE4200

- Package size: ?? mm × ?? mm
- 2 × 32-bit memory channels, up to DDR2-800
- GPU (based on the PowerVR SGX535 from Imagination Technologies)

Model	sSpec number	Cores	Clock rate	GPU frequency	L2 cache	I/O bus	Memory	Voltage	TDP	Socket	Release date	Part number(s)	Release price (USD)
Atom CE4215	SLJKD		1200 MHz	—N/a	512 KB		2 × DDR2-800		7 W	FC-BGA 1283		CLCE4215S0	
Atom CE4235	SLJEU; SLJGA; SLJL6; SLJNJ; SLJNQ; SLKAP; SLKBG; SLKCD		1200 MHz	—N/a	512 KB		2 × DDR2-800		7 W	FC-BGA 1283		CLCE4235EDS4; CLCE4235DS4; CLCE4235DS4; CLCE4235EDS4; CLCE4235DS4; CLCE4235DS4; CLCE4235EDS4; CLCE4235DS4	
Atom CE4253	SLJNN; SLJNS (D0); SLJS8; SLK9G (E0); SLK9K; SLKEC		1200 MHz	400 MHz	512 KB		2 × DDR2-800		7 W	FC-BGA 1283		CLCE4253ES4; CLCE4253EDS1; CLCE4253ES4; CLCE4253EDS1; CLCE4253ES4; CLCE4253EDS1	
Atom CE4255	SLJTK; SLK9F; SLJD7; SLJG5		1200 MHz	—N/a	512 KB		2 × DDR2-800		7 W	FC-BGA 1283		CLCE4255DS4; CLCE4255DS4; CLCE4255EDS1; CLCE4255S0	
Atom CE4257	SLJJT; SLJKN; SLK7S; SLK9L; SLKCL; SLJD4		1200 MHz	—N/a	512 KB		2 × DDR2-800		7 W	FC-BGA 1283		CLCE4257ES1; CLCE4257S0; CLCE4257E4; CLCE4257S0; CLCE4257E4; CLCE4257EDS0	
Atom CE4270	SLJFA		1600 MHz	—N/a	512 KB		2 × DDR2-800		7 W	FC-BGA 1283		CLCE4270S0	
Atom CE4275	SLJD5; SLJNH; SLK4E; SLJD8		1600 MHz	—N/a	512 KB		2 × DDR2-800		7 W	FC-BGA 1283		CLCE4275EDS0; CLCE4275EDS0; CLCE4275EDS0; CLCE4275S0	
Atom CE4277	SLKCQ (E0); SLKEB (E0); SLJF9		1600 MHz	—N/a	512 KB		2 × DDR2-800		7 W	FC-BGA 1283		CLCE4277EDS0; CLCE4277EDS0; CLCE4277S0	

=== Dual-Core CE SoCs ===
==== "Berryville" (32 nm) ====
- Package size: ?? mm × ?? mm
- GPU for 3D (based on the PowerVR SGX545 from Imagination Technologies)
- GPU for 2D (GC300 from Vivante)

Model	sSpec number	Cores	Clock rate	GPU frequency	L2 cache	I/O bus	Memory	Voltage	TDP	Socket	Release date	Part number(s)	Release price (USD)
Atom CE5310	SR0UD; SR10Z; SR11A; SR1ZE; SR22B		1200 MHz	? MHz	512		DDR3-1600					DHCE5310S4; DHCE5310ES4; DHCE5310S5; DHCE5310DS5; DHCE5310DS4	
Atom CE5315	SR0UE; SR10W; SR112; SR119; SR141; SR1RF; SR1ZC; SR22C		1200 MHz	? MHz			DDR3-1600		10–15 W			DHCE5315S4; DHCE5315EDS4; DHCE5315EDS4; DHCE5315S5; DHCE5315S4; DHCE5315DS5; DHCE5315DS5; DHCE5315S4	
Atom CE5318			1200 MHz	? MHz			DDR3-1600						
Atom CE5320			1200 MHz	? MHz			DDR3-1600						
Atom CE5328			1200 MHz	? MHz			DDR3-1600						
Atom CE5335	SR0UC; SR1HG; SR1ZB; SR1ZD; SR1ZF		1600 MHz	? MHz	512		DDR3-1600					DHCE5335S4; DHCE5335S5; DHCE5335EDS4; DHCE5335DS5; DHCE5335S5	
Atom CE5338			1800 MHz	? MHz			DDR3-1600						
Atom CE5343			1800 MHz	? MHz			DDR3-1600						
Atom CE5348			1800 MHz	? MHz			DDR3-1600						

== See also ==
- Atom (system on chip)
- Comparison of Intel processors
- List of Intel Celeron microprocessors
- Intel GMA
- Stealey (A100/A110)
- Geode (processor)
- VIA Nano
- Intel Quark
- Intel Edison
