= CNVi =

Proprietary interface created by Intel

CNVi or CNVio ("Connectivity Integration", Intel Integrated Connectivity I/O interface) is a proprietary connectivity interface by Intel for Wi-Fi and Bluetooth radios ostensibly to lower costs and simplify their wireless modules. In CNVi, the network adapter's large and usually expensive functional blocks (MAC components, memory, processor and associated logic/firmware) are moved inside the CPU and chipset (Platform Controller Hub). Only the signal processor, analog and Radio frequency (RF) functions are left on an external upgradeable CRF (Companion RF) module which, as of 2019 comes in M.2 form factor (M.2 2230 and 1216 Soldered Down). Therefore, CNVi requires chipset and Intel CPU support. Otherwise the Wi-Fi + Bluetooth module has to be the traditional M.2 PCIe form factor.

CNVio was introduced on desktop platforms in 2017 with the launch of Gemini Lake, and on mobile Intel platforms in 2018 with Coffee Lake. CNVio2 was introduced on desktop platform with Comet Lake and on mobile platform with Ice Lake.

The AC 9560 and 9460 series of wireless modules, which include both Wi-Fi and Bluetooth capabilities, represent the first generation of CNVi modules. These modules are compatible exclusively with systems featuring Intel 8th or 9th generation processors on specially adapted motherboards. The Intel Wireless-AC 9260 card, available in a traditional M.2 form factor, is the non-CNVio variant. Additionally, the Wi-Fi 6 AX20x (& AX101) series and Wi-Fi 6E AX21x (& AX411) series, which supports Wi-Fi 6E at 6 GHz, is offered in both M.2 CNVio2 and M.2 PCIe form factors. In these series, a model number ending in '0' indicates a PCIe M.2 (NGFF) card (e.g., AX200, AX210), while a model ending in '1' signifies a CNVio2 card (e.g., AX201, AX211, AX411).

CNVio3 cards were also recently introduced with the BE201 and BE401 cards (Intel's codename for these are Fillmore Peak 2). These support both Wi-Fi 7 on the 2.4GHz, 5GHz and 6GHz band with 2x2 MIMO, 320MHz bandwidth and WPA3 security and Bluetooth 5.4.
