= Inter-Chip USB =

Addendum to the USB-IF USB 2.0 specification

Inter-Chip USB (IC-USB), sometimes referred to as USB-IC or Inter Chip USB, is an addendum to the USB Implementers Forum (USB-IF) USB 2.0 specification. IC-USB is intended as a low-power variant of the standard physical USB interface, intended for direct chip-to-chip communications. The IC-USB bus's maximum length of 10 cm results in a lower inductance and capacitance and therefore allows lower power requirements. IC-USB is used primarily in embedded systems; for example, ETSI (in specification TS 102 600) has standardized on IC-USB as the official high-speed interface for connections between the main chipset of a smartphone and the SIM card or UICC card.

High-Speed Inter-Chip (HSIC) is a chip-to-chip variant of USB 2.0 that eliminates the conventional analog transceivers found in normal USB. It was adopted as a standard by the USB-IF in 2007. The HSIC physical layer uses about 50% less power and 75% less board area compared to traditional USB 2.0. HSIC uses two signals at 1.2 V and has a throughput of 480 Mbit/s. Maximum PCB trace length for HSIC is 10 cm. It does not have low enough latency to support RAM sharing between two chips.

SuperSpeed Inter-Chip (SSIC) is the USB 3.0 successor of HSIC.

The USB-IF Inter-Chip USB Supplement was released in March 2006. ETSI TS 102 600, which is ETSI's USB implementation requirements specification, was first released in December 2007.

== Technical documents ==
- "Inter-Chip USB Supplement Revision 1.0". USB-IF. March 13, 2006.
- "High-Speed Inter-Chip USB Electrical Specification Revision 1.0". USB-IF. September 23, 2007.
- "Inter-Chip Supplement to the USB Revision 3.0 Specification, Revision 1.02". USB-IF. May 19, 2014.
