= Toughbook =

Line of rugged laptop computers made by Panasonic

Logo as of 2017
Logo as of 2003

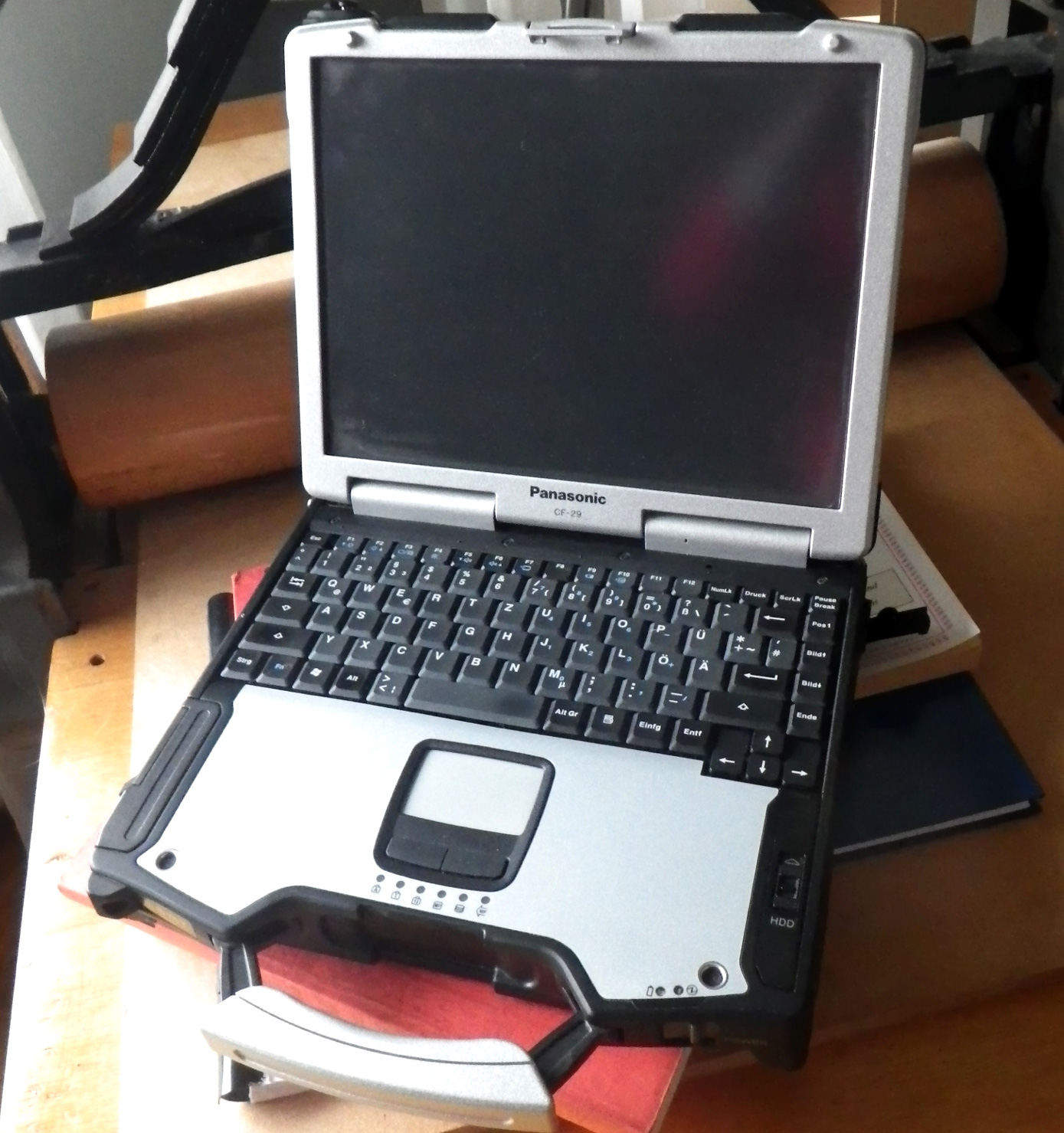
Panasonic Toughbook CF-29 (c. 2006)

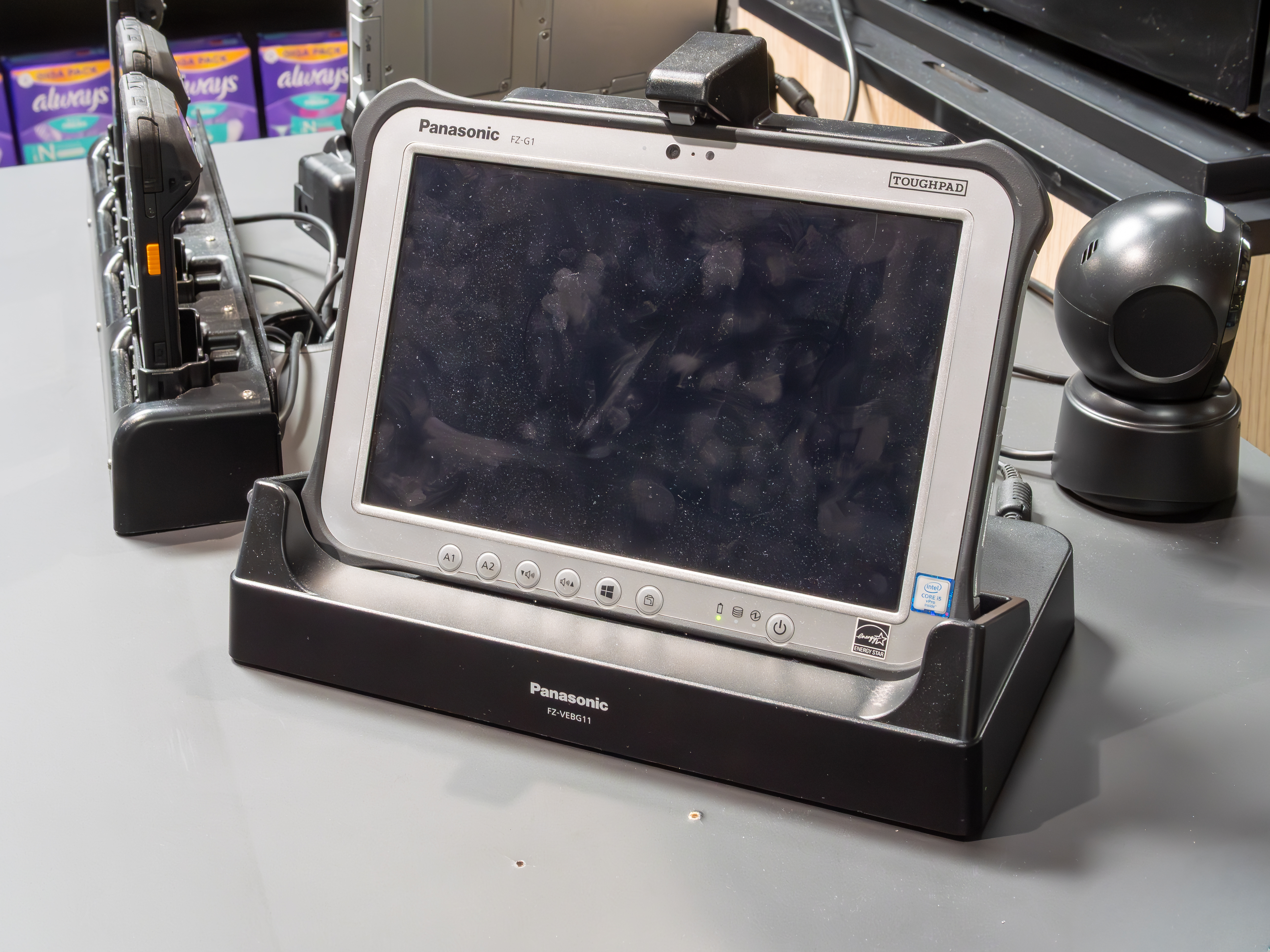
Toughpad FZ-G1 with docking station

The Panasonic Toughbook is a line of rugged computers produced and marketed by Panasonic. The first model, the CF-25, was introduced in 1996. The Toughbook brand mainly competes with other lines of rugged computers, such as Dell's Rugged Extreme.

In 2011, Panasonic introduced the Toughpad brand of ruggedized tablets, built to many of the same specifications as its Toughbook laptop line.

== Design ==
All Toughbook models have a magnesium alloy case. Many current models have liquid-crystal display (LCD) panels. Other design elements include a shock-mounted hard drive and, on many models, a moisture and dust-resistant LCD, keyboard and touchpad.

Panasonic markets the Toughbook series in several configurations ranging from "business-rugged" and "semi-rugged" to "fully rugged" in laptop, convertible tablet and tablet configurations, and in several specialty designs with numerous customizable add-on features.

== Toughbook fully rugged models ==
=== Toughbook CF-25 ===
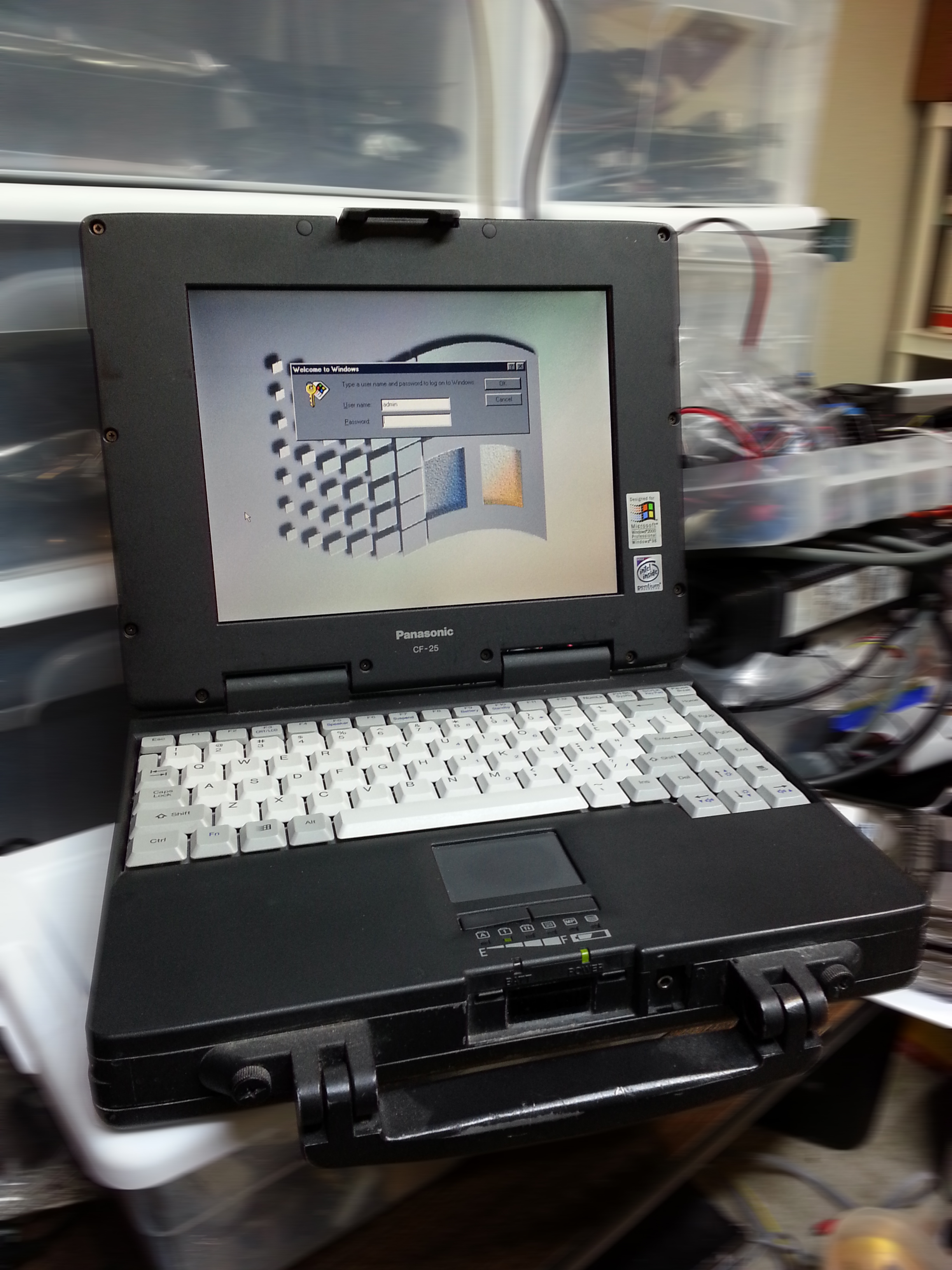
A Panasonic CF-25 Toughbook, the first Toughbook model ever released.

The CF-25 is the first fully rugged Panasonic Toughbook, released in 1996. Unlike other Toughbooks, it does not have the "Toughbook" logo on the outside (back) of the LCD case, instead displaying "Panasonic" in extruded plastic. The CF-25 featured an Intel Pentium processor with MMX and could support a maximum of 96MB of PC100 system RAM. The Toughbook did not have any USB and because of IRQ limitations could not allow any via PCMCIA. It was generally shipped with Windows 98.

=== Toughbook CF-27 ===
The CF-27 was a Pentium II era Toughbook introduced in 1997. It was the first one to bear the "TOUGHBOOK" logo on its back cover. It was also the first Toughbook with an XGA display and Wireless WAN built-in.

=== Toughbook CF-28 ===
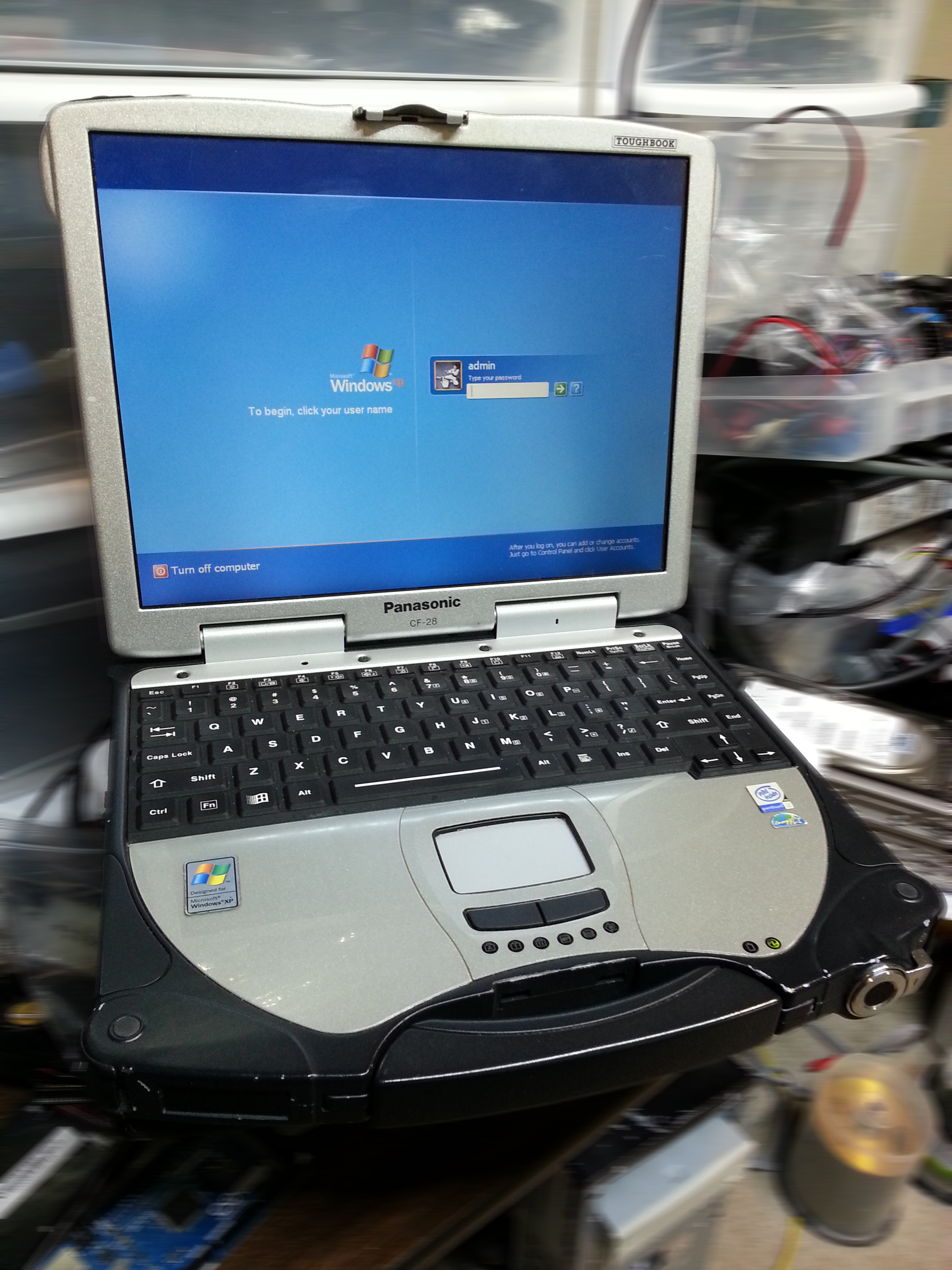
A Toughbook CF-28 MK3

The CF-28 was available with Intel Pentium 3 CPU's ranging from 600 MHz (Mk1 28), 800 MHz (Mk2 28) to 1 GHz (Mk3 28). This Toughbook featured a multitude of ports which at the time were industry standard. Additionally, some models had IrDA ports or built-in 802.11b WLAN. This model generally shipped with Windows 98, Windows 2000, or Windows XP. However, the majority of these came with Windows 2000 and XP, though older models (like the 600 MHz models) came shipped directly from Panasonic with a 98 COA sticker and an install of it as well.

=== Toughbook CF-29 ===
The CF-29 was introduced in 2003 and came in 5 "Marks". It featured an Intel Pentium M processor in speeds ranging from 1.2 to 1.6 GHz in either Ultra Low Voltage (1.2 GHz) or Low Voltage (1.3 GHz and up), depending on mark of laptop. The laptop featured Intel Centrino technology for power saving ability. The Mark 1, 2 and 3 used DDR RAM and the Mark 4 and 5 used DDR2. The CF-29 Toughbook offered multiple configurations from the factory including backlit keyboard and touchscreen. Notably, from the CF-29 on, Panasonic changed the power supply connector previously used on the CF-25, CF-27, CF-28, etc. for a new connector. This Toughbook generally shipped with Windows XP with Windows 2000 as a downgrade option.

=== Toughbook CF-30 ===
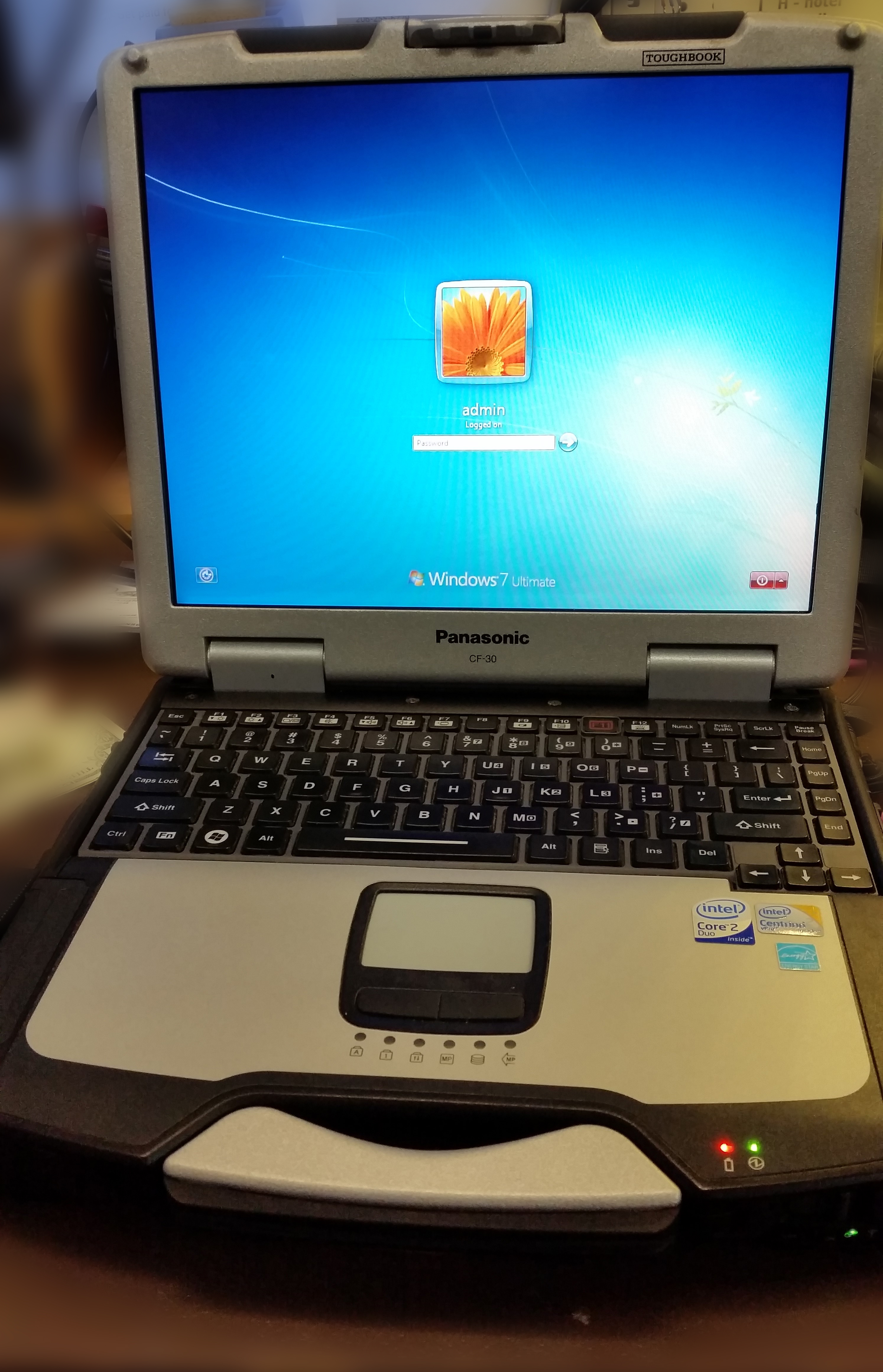
A CF-30 Toughbook

The Toughbook CF-30 incorporates low voltage dual core processors. The MK1 version shipped with a 32-bit Intel Core Duo processor, while the MK2 and MK3 versions switched to the 64-bit Core 2 Duo processors. As with the CF-19 Mk1 to Mk3, it uses DDR2 SDRAM. It is another in the fully rugged line of their laptops. It came in many configurations, some including: Emissive backlit keyboards, touchscreens, WWAN radios, Bluetooth, Wi-Fi b/g/n. Like the other fully rugged models, the CF-30 has a hard drive heater for cold environments. On some models Panasonic disabled access to the Gobi WWAN cards GPS function; a different WWAN card or a dedicated GPS card in the WWAN slot must be used. The CF-30 supports a second battery in the media bay, as well as DVD drives and other accessories. This Toughbook was generally shipped with Windows Vista, with the Mk3 models shipping with Windows 7.

=== Toughbook CF-31 ===
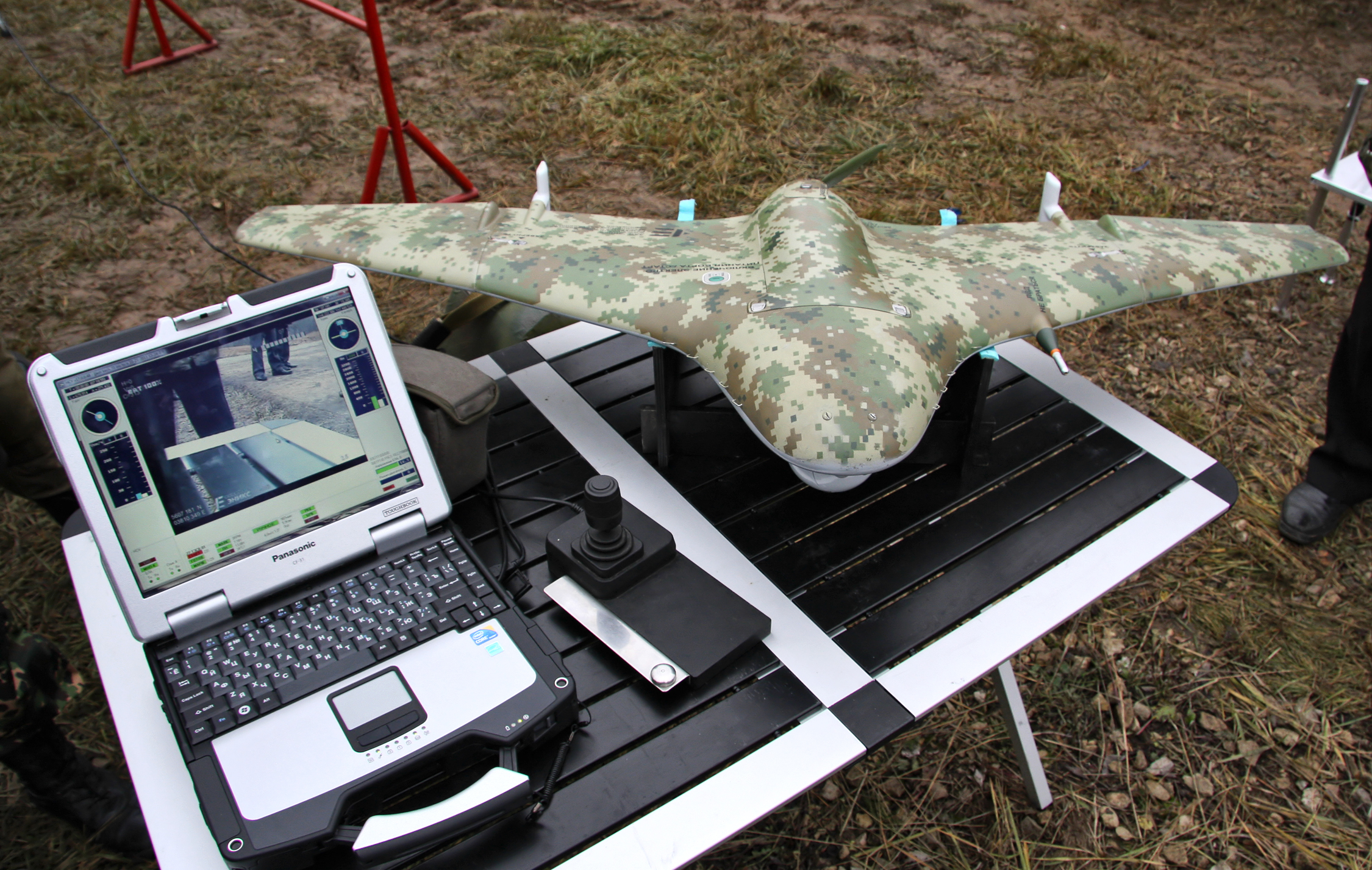
A Panasonic CF-31 Toughbook being used as a control station for a Russian Army Eleron-3 drone

The Toughbook CF-31 was first released in 2010. As part of the sixth generation of Panasonic's Toughbook line. The Toughbook CF-31 has MIL-STD-810G and IP65 certification. It is designed with a touchscreen.

Specifications for the Toughbook CF-31 include a shock-mounted hard drive, removable through locking reinforced port doors. It runs on either an Intel Core i3, Core i5 or Core i7 processor with 4-16 GB of DDR3 SDRAM.

Integrated options include 4G LTE multi carrier mobile broadband as well as satellite GPS. CF-31 units may also be equipped with a sealed backlit keyboard or a rubberized backlit keyboard, as well as a fingerprint scanner or smart card reader for additional security. Just like the CF-30 and below, it also supports a DVD drive, secondary battery, or if one removes a rubber "bumper" strip on the inside of the media bay door, a dummy insert.

The CF-31 had a resolution of 1024 x 768, and was the last Panasonic laptop to feature a 4:3 fullscreen display. It was discontinued in April of 2020. Panasonic no longer makes laptops with 4:3 displays.

=== Toughbook 40 ===
The Toughbook 40 is the latest Toughbook model, first released in 2022. The Toughbook 40 has MIL-STD-810H, MIL-STD-461G, IP66 and optional C1D2 certification. The specifications of a Panasonic Toughbook 40 include a 14" FHD nit multi touch display, magnesium alloy chassis with handle, replaceable screen protector, user-removable xPAK's, RAM, keyboard, battery and caged SSD (with heater), reinforced locking port covers, a 5MP webcam with privacy cover & tetra-array mic infrared with Windows Hello support. The Panasonic Toughbook 40 also includes an optional Blu-ray drive with xPAK and optional DVD drive with xPAK.

== Convertible Toughbook tablets ==
=== Toughbook CF-19 ===
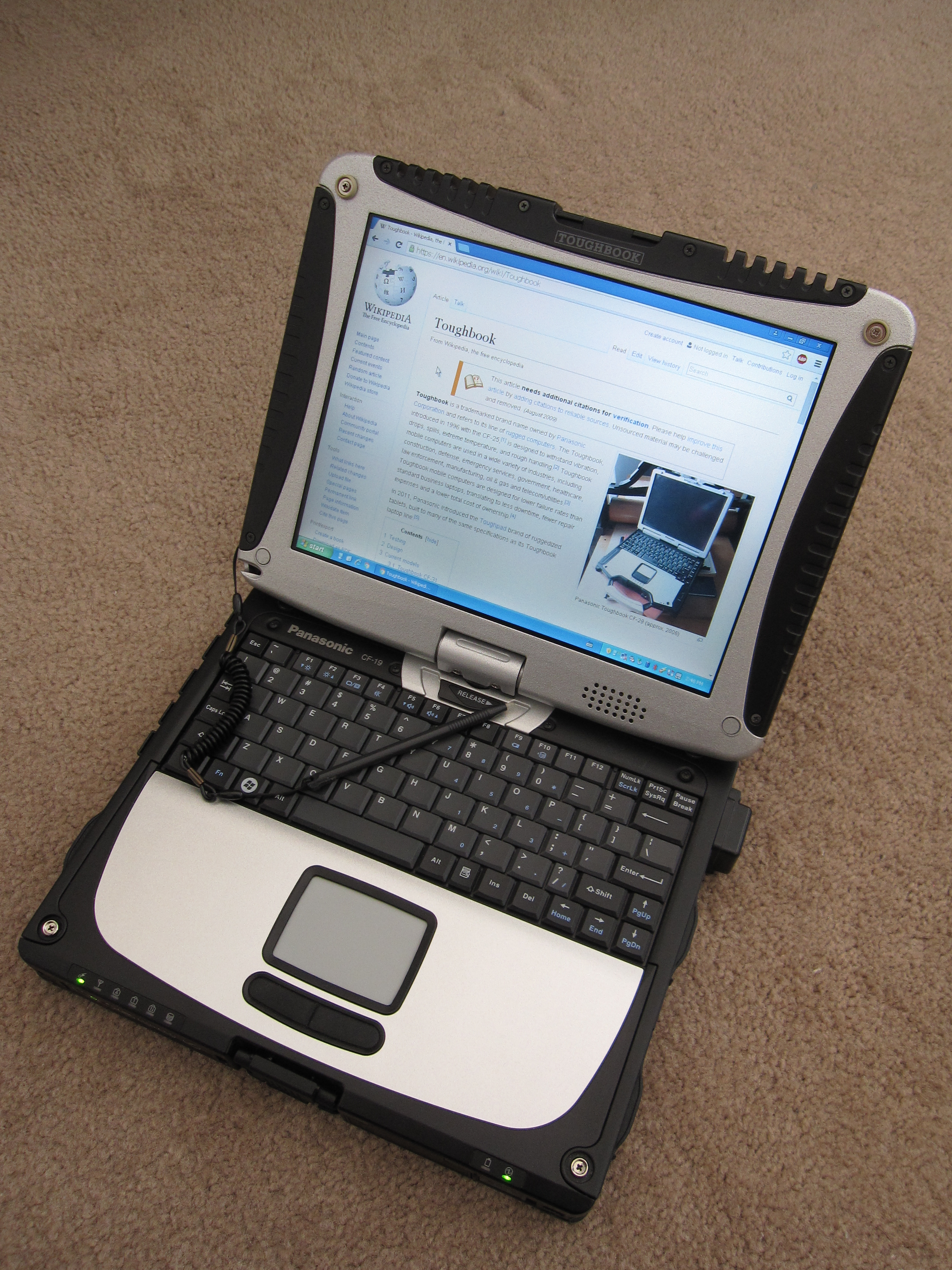
A Toughbook CF-19 MK1 (approx. 2006) displaying Toughbook's Wikipedia page.

The Toughbook CF-19, in its 8th mark/generation, is a fully rugged device that can be used as a laptop or swiveled into a tablet. It is tested to withstand a six-foot drop and IP65 certified fanless design providing water and dust resistance. The device also features a shock-mounted hard drive, full magnesium alloy case and available explosive atmosphere certification (Class 1 Div 2) for hazardous environments.

Features of the Toughbook CF-19 convertible tablet include a 10.1" (pre-Mk5 models had a 10.4" screen) daylight readable screen with touchscreen designed to work with gloves, integrated wireless connectivity like GPS and 4G WWAN, and a range of integrated options like a fingerprint reader or smartcard reader.

Like the other fully rugged Toughbooks, it is also available with a rubberized backlit keyboard, or a backlit chiclet keyboard.

As of July 2017, after nearly eleven years, the CF-19 has been discontinued and succeeded by the CF-20 2-in-1 tablet.

=== Toughbook CF-20 ===
The Toughbook CF-20 is a convertible tablet/netbook device.

=== Toughbook CF-C2 ===
The Toughbook CF-C2 is a semi-rugged convertible tablet. Its triple-hinge design allows it to be converted from a tablet to a laptop configuration. It has a magnesium alloy case and shock-mounted flex-connect hard drive allowing it to handle up to a 30-inch drop to six sides, as well as a 12-inch drop from 26 angles. The computer also features a spill-resistant keyboard (up to 6 ounces).

The Toughbook CF-C2 weighs 3.99 pounds and has a built-in ergonomic hand strap for handheld use. It has a 12.5" HD touchscreen, Intel Core i5 processor and a range of integrated options.

Panasonic announced the End of Life of the CF-C2 product line in October 2016.

On June 12, 2008, a mandatory safety bulletin was published for this model and the CF-SX. Battery Diagnosis Control software should be installed in order to prevent battery related incidents. Panasonic states that, "This mandatory software update incorporates safety measures to monitor the condition and health of the battery."

== Toughbook semi-rugged and business-rugged models ==
=== Panasonic CF-41 ===
This was the very first model of the Panasonic CF-XX series, released in March 1995. It was not marketed with the name "Toughbook" at that time, however it is technically the first model released in the Toughbook line of laptops, also marketed under the "Panasonic Pronote AV" name in Japan. It was on the market until October 1996 and was built in 3 models that had improved specifications over time; the CF-41 Mk1, the CF-41 Mk2 and the CF-41 Mk3. The range of processors fitted ranged from the 486DX2 up to the Pentium 120. The included memory ranged from 4MB up to 16MB with an expandability up to 32MB for some models. All models featured ESS soundcard audio, a quad speed CD drive, 1.4MB 3 1/2-inch floppy drive and 2 PCMCIA slots. The screens on most of the models are 640x480 TFT modules, with the very early models offering 640x480 STN modules and some of the later MK3 models offering 800x600 TFT modules. The installed 2.5 inch hard drives ranged from 260MB up to 1.35GB. A unique feature of the CF-41 is that the CD drive is accessed by lifting the keyboard; the under keyboard compartment also provided storage for another CD. IBM similarly on the ThinkPad 760 series, featured swappable components such as its CD drive, hard drive and battery via lifting the keyboard.

=== Toughbook CF-45 ===
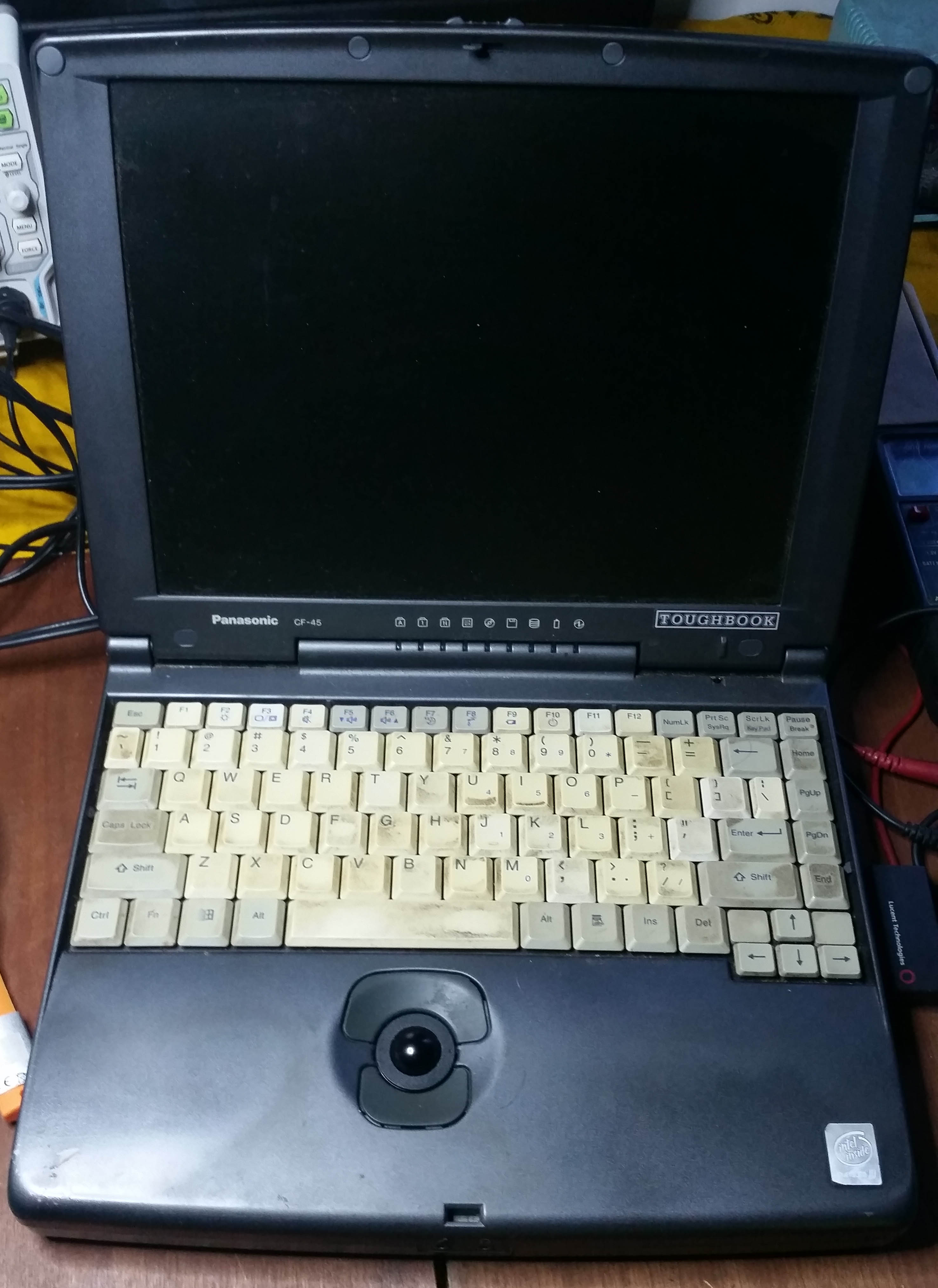
Toughbook CF-45, c. 1998.

The CF-45 model is one of the earliest models of the Toughbook series. Equipped with an Intel Pentium MMX running at 200 or 233 MHz, it has a base memory of 32MB and is extendable up to 96MB EDO SODIMM via a socket accessible underneath the hard disk. A 2.5" IDE hard disk interface is included (with stock sizes of 2 and 4GB), slim-line CD and 3.5" floppy drive, as were two PCMCIA slots. Other interfaces on the device were: Infrared port, USB 1.1 interface, one PS2 for either keyboard or mouse, RS232 serial, parallel printer port, 15-pin VGA output, and head-phone and microphone jacks. On the left it sports a small hardware reset button that can be tripped with a pen or other small object. On the bottom of the device, a 100-pin expansion slot is available for docking stations/extensions. The display is a 12.1" TFT with 800x600 pixels resolution and 256k colors.

The battery is a rather compact housing Li-Ion with 10.8V 2.3Ah, which is accessed through a small lid on the bottom, as is the hard disk bay. The power supply supports input voltages of 100–240 V AC, with an output rated at 15.6 V 3.85 A.

=== Toughbook CF-51 ===
The "business-rugged" CF-51 was released in the mid-2000s and featured a 15-inch UXGA (1600x1200) screen. Early versions sported "Pentium M" (Centrino) chips; later models switched to the Core Duo.

=== Toughbook CF-52 ===
The Toughbook CF-52 is a 15.4" widescreen semi-rugged laptop. It met semi-rugged standards for environmental resistance. The CF-52 includes an ATI Radeon HD 3650 Graphics chipset. Other enhancements include an Intel Core i5 processor and expanded capacity for both hard disk storage and RAM.

=== Toughbook CF-53 ===
The Toughbook CF-53 is a previous semi-rugged laptop iteration. Like the Toughbook CF-54, it is MIL-STD-810G certified for 3' drops as well as resistant to shock, dust, vibration, altitude & other environmental factors. The Toughbook CF-53 also comes equipped with a spill-resistant keyboard and multi-touch touchpad as well as standard integrated DVD drive. A sunlight-viewable touchscreen protected by a replaceable film screen is also available as an integrated option, although not all CF-53 units have said touchscreen, with non-touch units having a different, slightly more powerful configuration.

Processor options include both Intel Core i3 and i5 processors, with respective speeds ranging from 2.1 to 2.7 GHz. Drive options include 320 GB HDD or 128 GB SSD, and memory is expandable to 8 GB on all current models.

=== Toughbook CF-54 ===
The Toughbook CF-54 is a notebook in Panasonic's line of semi-rugged laptops, announced in February 2015. It is available in four models: Lite, Prime, Gloved Multi Touch and Performance. Each model features a 14-inch HD (768p) or Full HD (1080p) display, hard drive heater, backlit spill-resistant keyboard and integrated handle. As a semi-rugged laptop, it meets standards for semi-rugged levels of environmental resistance, including MIL-STD-810G certification for drops of up to 3 feet.

MK1 It is powered by an Intel Core i5 Skylake processor with an Intel HD Graphics 520 iGPU, or an optional AMD FirePro M5100 dedicated GPU, with 4–16 GB RAM depending on the model. The unit is 1.2 inches thick and weighs between 4.2 and 4.6 pounds.

MK2

- Intel® Core™ i5-6300U vPro™ processor (6th Gen CPU) 2.4 GHz with Turbo Boost up to 3.0 GHz, 3MB cache
- Intel® Core™ i7-6600U vPro™ processor8 (6th Gen CPU) 2.6 GHz with Turbo Boost up to 3.4 GHz, 4MB cache Graphics
- Intel® HD Graphics 520 (all models)
- AMD FirePro™ M5100 (Performance model) Memory (RAM) - 2 slots upgradeable
- Performance model: 8GB or 16GB total (DDR3L-1600MT/s)
- Other models: 4GB, 8GB or 16GB total (DDR3L-1600MT/s)

MK3

- Intel® Core™ i5-7300U vPro™ processor (7th Gen CPU) 2.6 GHz with Turbo Boost up to 3.5 GHz, 3MB cache
- Intel® Core™ i7-7600U vPro™ processor (7th Gen CPU) 2.8 GHz with Turbo Boost up to 3.9 GHz, 4MB cache Graphics
- Intel® HD Graphics 620 (all models)
- AMD Radeon™ Pro WX 4150 (Performance model) Memory (RAM) - 2 slots upgradeable
- Performance model: 16GB up to 32GB total (DDR4-2133MT/s)
- Other models: 8GB, 16GB or 32GB total (DDR4-2133MT/s)s)

=== Toughbook FZ-55 ===
The Toughbook 55 or FZ-55 is the replacement of the Toughbook CF-54, it was released in September 2019. It now features 9th gen Intel Whiskey Lake processors with integrated Intel UHD Graphics 620, an optional AMD Radeon Pro WX4150 dGPU, MIL-STD-810H and IP53 certification, and many customization options in the form of xPAK modules that slide in the sides of the laptop. While heavier than the preceding CF-54, it has almost twice the battery life: 20 hours on a single battery.

=== Toughbook CF-SX2 ===
The Toughbook CF-SX2 is a business-rugged laptop designed for mobile professionals. It has a drop-resistant magnesium alloy design and shock-mounted flex-connect hard drive, allowing it to handle up to a 30-inch drop to the base of the unit while operating, as well as a 12-inch drop from all other angles.

The Toughbook CF-SX2 features a 12.1" HD display and runs on an Intel Core i5 processor with 4GB or 8GBs of SDRAM.

=== Toughbook CF-AX3 ===
The Toughbook CF-AX3 is a business-rugged Ultrabook with a 360° flip-over hinge design that converts into a tablet. It is tested to withstand a 76 cm drop and passes a 100-kgf pressurized vibration test.

It has an 11.6" 1080p HD 10-finger capacitive display touchscreen and runs on an Intel Core i5 processor.

=== Toughbook CF-LX3 ===
The Toughbook CF-LX3 was a business-rugged notebook that is tested to withstand a 76 cm drop and passes a 100-kgf pressurized vibration test. It has a 14" HD display and features an Intel Core i5 processor.

=== Toughbook CF-MX4 ===
The Toughbook CF-MX4 was a business-rugged device with a 2-in-1 flip-over design that converts into laptop, tablet and presentation modes. It has a 12.5" touchscreen display and features an Intel Core i5 processor.

== Toughbook tablets ==
=== Toughbook CF-H2 ===
The Toughbook CF-H2 was a fully rugged handheld tablet PC. It has a sealed all-weather design and a magnesium alloy chassis encased in polycarbonate, and is IP65 and MIL-STD-810G certified with the ability to handle drops of up to six feet.

Features of the Toughbook CF-H2 includes a 10.1" sunlight-viewable LED touch screen, hot-swappable twin batteries, optional integrated barcode and SmartCard readers, and embedded wireless options, including 4G LTE mobile broadband.

=== Toughbook CF-D1 ===
The Toughbook CF-D1 was a fully rugged diagnostic tablet designed to allow field engineers to run real-time diagnostic programs, read telematic data and view schematics and designs. It has a 13.3" anti-glare widescreen LCD with a shock-protected HDD. It was designed to withstand drops of up to three feet and is IP65 rated for water and dust resistance.

== Toughbook UMPC ==
=== Toughbook CF-U1 ===
The Toughbook CF-U1 is a fully rugged ultra-mobile PC that runs the full Windows 7 Professional operating system. It has a 5.6” LCD touch screen and dual hot-swappable batteries. It has a sealed, fan-less design that meets MIL-STD-810G and IP65 standards for environmental conditions, including withstanding a drop of 6 feet from any angle.

Its hard drive used a proprietary connector system that was unique to Panasonic Toughbooks, and connects into the motherboard by a 40 pin ZIF cable. This allows for a mSATA to ZIF adapter to be plugged into the toughbook, and used as its main hard drive. The devices shipped with a 3G card modem, which can be removed to allow the SSD modification to fit within the device without impacting the dual battery slots. Alternatively, if one wants to keep the toughbook as it was in stock configuration, the ZIF cable can be run through a battery compartment, and if the drive is wrapped in Kapton tape or electrical tape, can be electrically isolated from potential short circuit damage resulting from the assembly touching the metal shell. Those modifying a CF-U1 should take note that drives larger than 64 GB tend to have issues, with 128GB devices being slower than they should be and with the device locking up entirely if a 256 GB SSD is used until it is unplugged.

The CF-U1 is notable for its small size and full QWERTY-type keyboard, along with a touchscreen, giving it a form factor similar to a large Blackberry phone, despite having the power of a full PC.

The Toughbook CF-U1 was discontinued in 2014.
