= Monoboard =

A monoboard is a device or product that consists of a single printed circuit board (PCB). It can also refer to a single-board computer.

== Benefits ==
The primary benefit of a monoboard solution is cost savings. There are a number of ways that incorporating all parts on a single board can reduce costs. The primary reason is that solutions with multiple boards require connections between the boards via edge connectors, and sometimes include a ribbon cable. By connecting devices directly together on the same PCB, there is no need for these additional connectors and cables. Additionally, PCB space may be optimized using electronic design automation (EDA) tools, resulting in a smaller device as well as further cost savings. Aesthetically enhanced micro branding is used as well.

== Disadvantages ==
The disadvantages of using a monoboard solution is that they are inflexible to upgrades. For example, take a personal computer; in most personal computers, the video card is an external device that plugs into a dedicated slot in the motherboard and may be swapped out with a higher performing card. However, in small form-factor designs, a graphics processing unit (GPU) may be placed directly on the board. The typical reason is to reduce size and cost, but this removed the ability to later upgrade the device.

Another common example is with data acquisition hardware. Many DAQ solutions involve the use of DAQ modules, which are cards that plug into a backplane. Different DAQ modules can be purchased with different functionalities depending on the speed and resolution of signals being acquired. Examples of this can be seen in products ranging from Fluke DAQs to Tektronix Logic Analyzer modules (such as the TLA7000 series frames which support more than 4 different series of acquisition cards).

== Examples ==
- Personal computers, specifically small form-factor versions such as the UMPC or MacBook Air
- Data acquisition hardware
- Cameras
- Mobile phones
- Single-board computer
