= Samsung Q1 =

Samsung ultra-mobile PC family

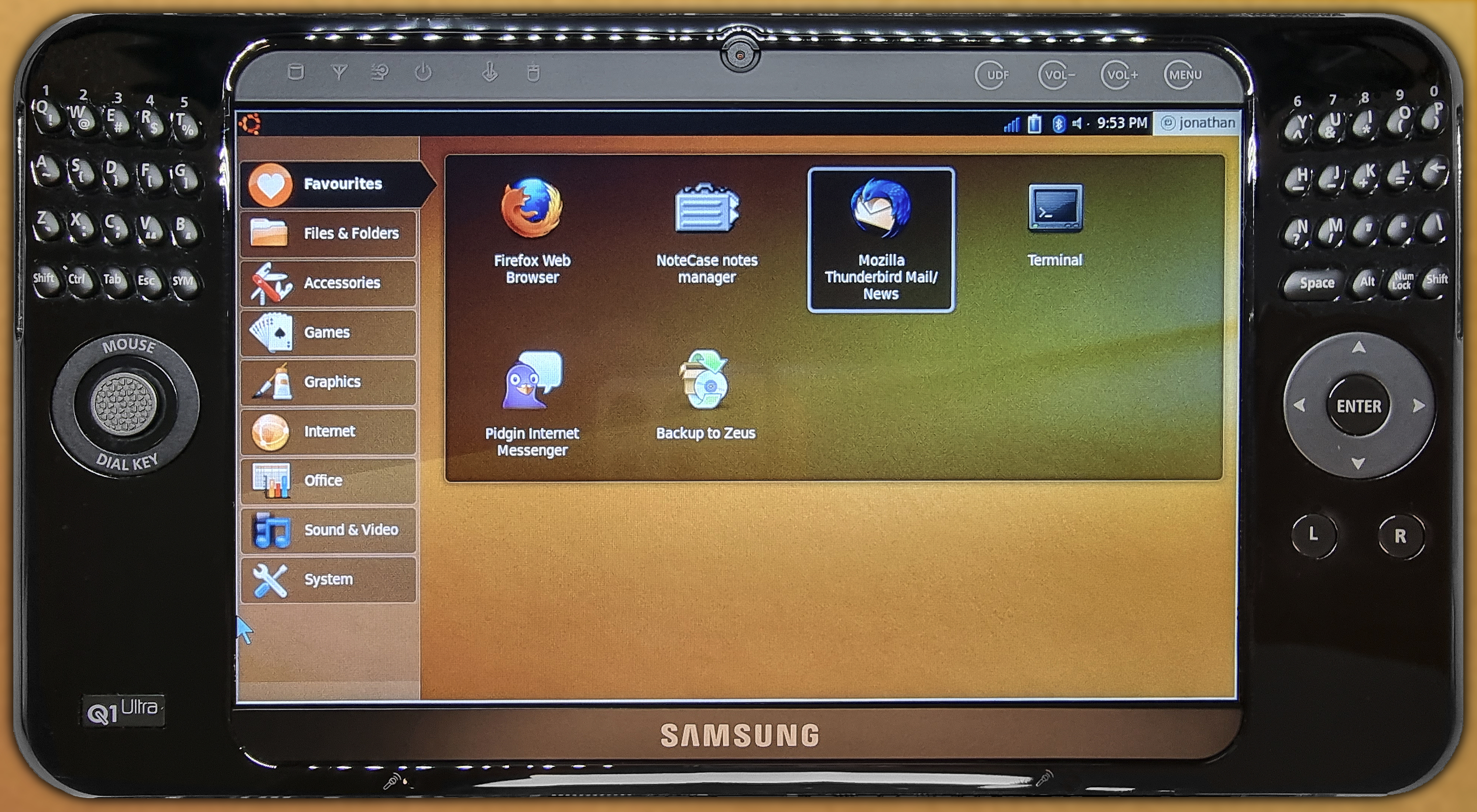
Samsung Q1 Ultra UMPC running Ubuntu

The Samsung Q1 (known as Samsung SENS Q1 in South Korea) was a family of ultra-mobile PCs produced by Samsung Electronics starting in 2007. They had a 7" (18 cm) LCD and were made in several different versions with either Windows XP Tablet PC Edition or Windows Vista Home Premium.

== Variations ==
=== Q1 series ===
==== Samsung Q1 ====
- Intel Celeron M ULV (Ultra Low Voltage) 353 running at 900 MHz
- 40 GB 1.8" Hard Drive (ZIF interface)
- 512MB DDR2 533 (up to a maximum of 2 GB)
- Mobile Intel 915GMS Express Chipset
- 7 inch WVGA (800×480) resistive (single-touch) touch screen (using finger or stylus) with the included "Easy Display Manager" software allowing the user to downscale from 1024×600 and 1024×768 with a few button presses.
- VGA port
- Weighs 0.78 kg
- 3-cell battery (up to 3 hours) or 6-cell battery (up to 6 hours)
- WLAN 802.11b/g
- LAN port 100 mbit
- CompactFlash port Type II
- Stereo speakers
- Dual array microphones
- Instant-On mode "AVStation Now", based on Windows Embedded
- Bluetooth enabled
- Digital Multimedia Broadcasting receiver
- 2 USB ports

The Q1 is one of the first ultra-mobile computers (UMPC) produced under Microsoft's "Origami" project. The Q1 can boot into two different modes: typical Windows XP (OS can be replaced), and AVS mode running Windows XP Embedded. AVS mode runs in a separate partition and boots directly to a music, photo, and video player with no Windows Explorer interface. The AVS feature is unique to the Q1.

==== Samsung Q1 SSD ====
The SSD version is identical to the Q1 except that the 40 GB hard disk drive has been replaced by Samsung's 32 GB solid-state drive. At release, the SSD version was about twice as expensive as the normal Q1.

==== Samsung Q1b ====
The Q1b was Samsung's second UMPC device, with a much improved battery life and 30% brighter screen compared to the Q1. The CF card slot and the Ethernet port were removed on this version. It also had a mono speaker and no microphones, with an external microphone jack being provided.

- VIA C7-M ULV @ 1 GHz
- VIA VX700 UMPC Chipset with Integrated Graphics
- 5 Hour Battery Life (using standard 3-cell battery)
- Wi-Fi (802.11 b/g, using a half-size Mini PCI card)
- Bluetooth v2.0
- 512 MB DDR2 RAM
- 40 GB Hard Drive
- Optional WiBro or HSDPA cellular Module (in a USB-only Mini PCIe WWAN slot)

==== Samsung Q1F (Pentium M) ====
Manufacturer Part #: NP-Q1-F000

This is almost identical to the original Q1 but with a faster 1 GHz Intel Pentium M processor (723) which enables SpeedStep technology for better battery usage. It is possible to buy a 6-cell battery instead of the default 3-cell to double the time on all these devices. The Pentium edition also has:

- 1 GB DDR2 RAM
- 40 or 60 GB Hard Drive
- Microsoft Windows Vista

=== Q1 Ultra series ===
The Q1 Ultra series differed greatly from the original Q1 series with more features, including:

- Split keyboard
- SD card slot (replacing the CF card slot on its predecessor)
- Higher-resolution screen(1024×600 compared to 800×480)
- Front-facing camera
- The ability to use the joystick as a mouse.

==== Samsung Q1 Ultra ====
The Ultra model runs on a 600/800 MHz Intel A100/A110 (Stealey) processor and includes dual cameras, a 40GB/60GB hard disk, HSDPA and just like its predecessor, it comes installed with either Windows XP or Vista Home Premium.

All Q1U models offer a new split keyboard, 1GB of RAM (user upgradeable to 2GB), an SD card slot (excluding the base model), and a 1024×600 screen. A GPS accessory is also offered, which may be used with the included mapping software.

==== Samsung Q1 Ultra Premium ====
Uses an Intel Core Solo U1500 processor at 1330 MHz. 1GB of RAM upgradeable to 2GB.

This was the last and highest performance machine in the Q1 and Q1 Ultra series.

== See also ==
- OQO
- Tablet PC
- Sony Vaio UX Micro PC
- VIA NanoBook
- Nokia 770 Internet Tablet
- Nokia N800
- Pepper Pad
