= HTC Shift =

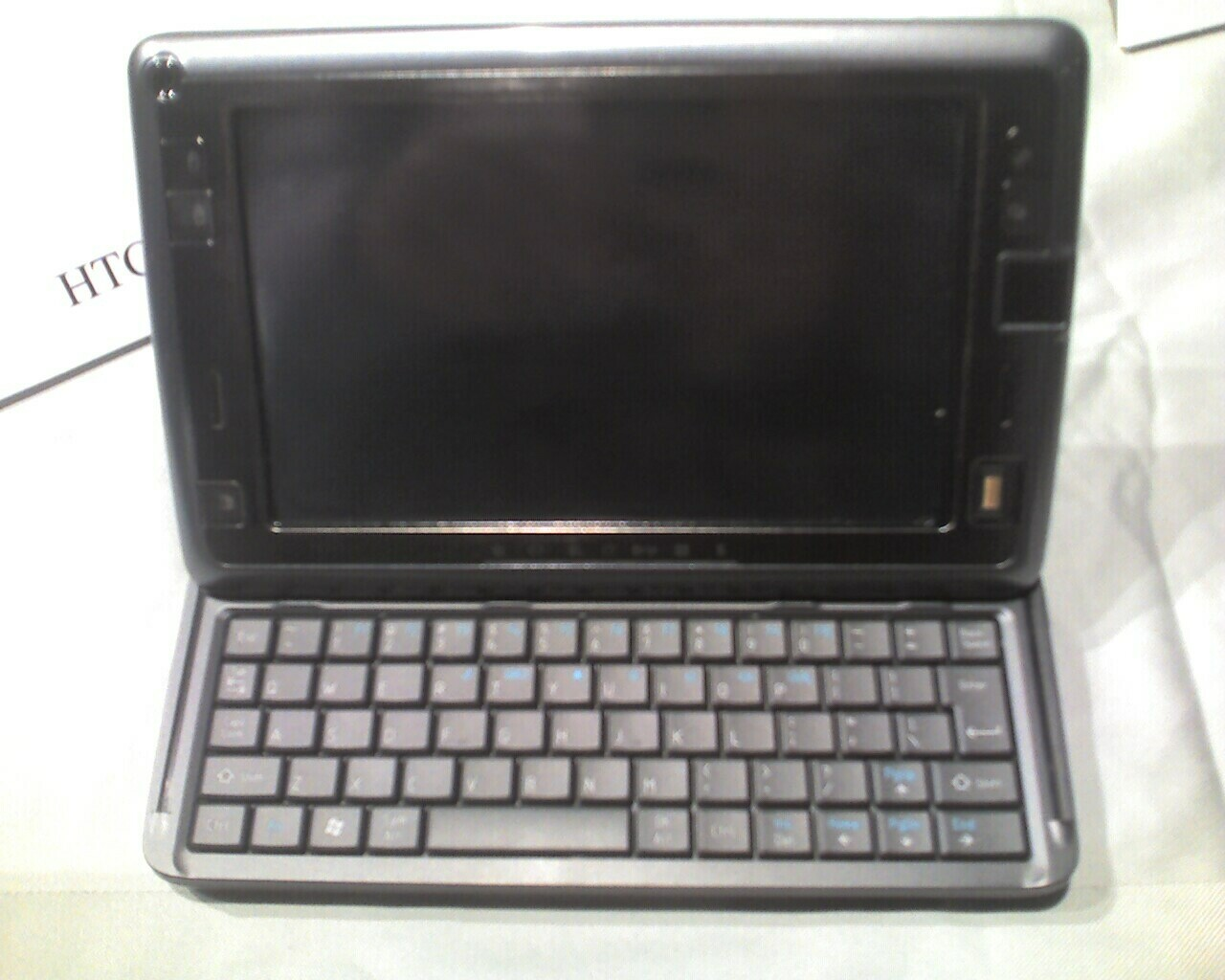
- HTC Shift running Windows Vista Business
- Developer: HTC
- Type: Ultra-Mobile PC
- Released: 2008 (January)
- CPU: Intel A110 Stealey CPU 800 MHz
- Website: HTC - Products - HTC Slider, archived at the Wayback Machine

HTC Shift (code name: Clio) is an Ultra-Mobile PC by HTC.

== Features ==
- Dual Operating System
  - Microsoft Windows Vista Business 32-bit (notebook mode)
  - SnapVUE (PDA mode)
- Processor
  - Intel A110 Stealey CPU 800 MHz (for Windows Vista)
  - ARM11 CPU (for SnapVUE)
- Memory and Storage
  - 1 GB RAM (notebook mode)
  - 64 MB RAM (PDA mode)
  - 40/60 GB HDD
  - SD card slot
- Intel GMA 950 graphics
- Communications
  - Quad band GSM / GPRS / EDGE (data only): GSM 850, GSM 900, GSM 1800, GSM 1900
  - Triband UMTS / HSDPA (data only): UMTS 850, UMTS 1900, UMTS 2100
  - Wi-Fi 802.11 b/g
  - Bluetooth 2.0
  - USB port
- 7" display
  - Active TFT touchscreen, 16M colors
  - 800 x 480 pixels (Wide-VGA), 7 inches
  - QWERTY keyboard
  - Handwriting recognition
- Fingerprint Recognition
- Ringtones
  - MP3
  - Dual speakers

== Upgrading ==
In November 2011 the team from DistantEarth succeeded in loading the developer preview of Windows 8 onto the HTC Shift.
