= OQO =

Computer hardware company

OQO, Inc.
- Type: Private
- Industry: Electronics
- Founded: 2000
- Defunct: 2009
- Headquarters: San Francisco, California
- Key people: Andrew Popell, Founder; Jory Bell, Founder; Jonathan Betts-LaCroix, Founder; Nick Merz, Founder; Robert Ford, Founder; Michael Prichard, Founder; Bob Rosin, SVP
- Products: Subnotebook computers
- Website: http://www.oqo.com/ (archive)

OQO was a U.S. computer hardware company that was notable for manufacture of handheld computers. Its systems possessed the functionality of a tablet PC in a size slightly larger than a personal digital assistant (PDA). According to Guinness World Records, the "OQO" was the smallest full-powered, full-featured personal computer in 2005. The company's first version of subnotebook computer was the OQO model 01. It had been compared with the Ultra Mobile PC platform, although it was introduced before the UMPC took flight. The company was founded in 2000.

OQO was reported to have stopped production in April 2009. The company confirmed that it had ceased operations in May 2009 because of financial difficulties.

== OQO Model 01 ==
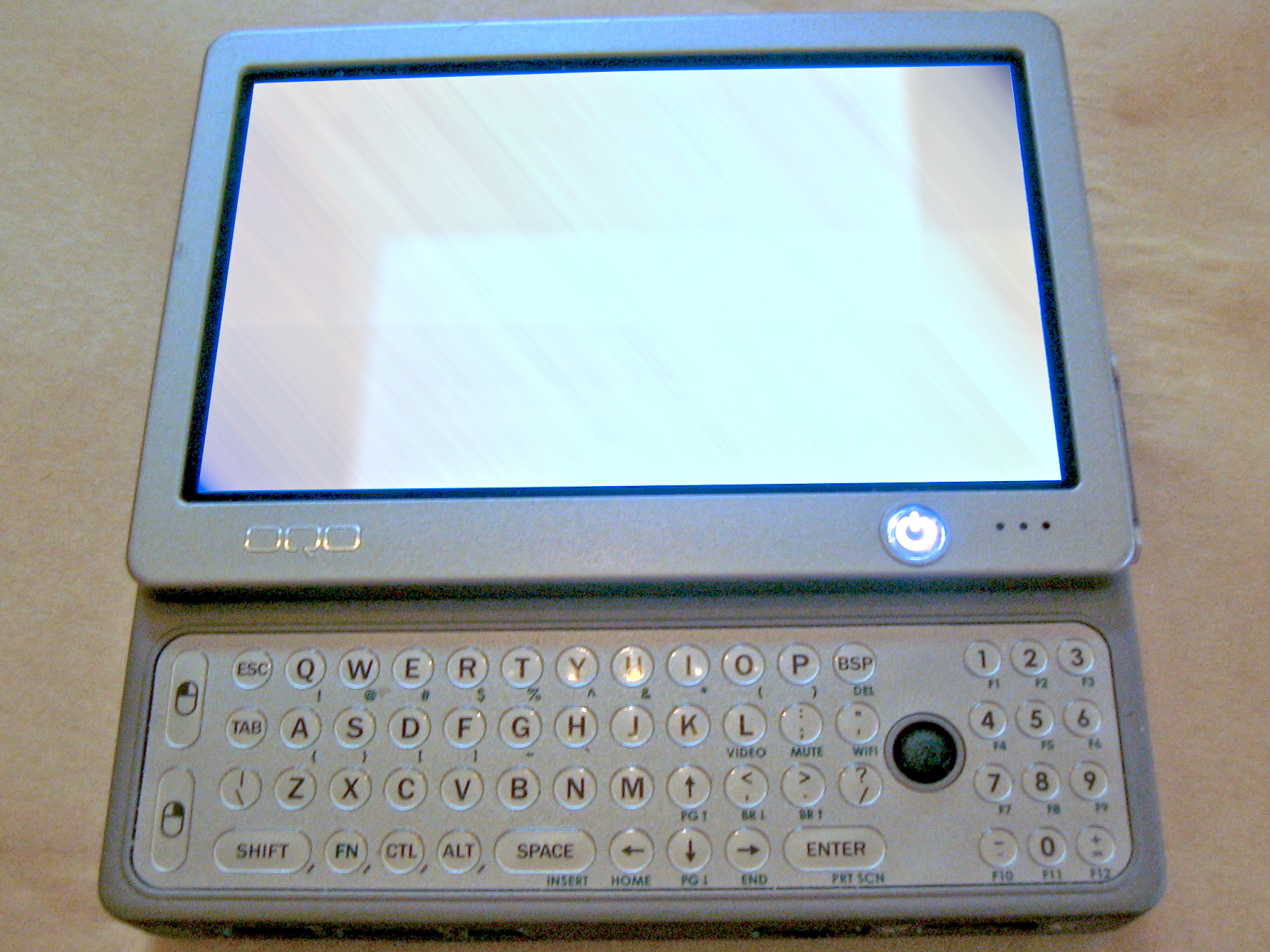
OQO Model 01

The original OQO model 01 was announced several years before prototypes were even seen, leading many people to call it vaporware until it was finally released in Q3 of 2004. The computer shipped with Windows XP installed (Home Edition or Professional, but the Tablet PC Edition was not available until the model 01+ was released) and featured a 1 GHz Transmeta Crusoe processor, 20 GB hard drive, and 256 MB of RAM. It included USB 1.1, FireWire 400, a headphone port, and a built-in microphone, integrated 802.11b wireless radio, as well as Bluetooth. The OQO used a Wacom electromagnetic induction-type pen stylus with a magnetic field sensitive 800x480 resolution transflective screen. Retail shipments began on October 14, 2004. Its size was 4.9 in × 3.4 in × 0.9 in (12.4 cm × 8.6 cm × 2.3 cm) and it weighed 0.9 pounds (410 g).

== OQO Model 01+ ==
The OQO model 01+ was announced and released on September 27, 2005. Representing an incremental update to the model 01, the model 01+ featured a larger 30 GB hard drive, 512 MB of RAM, USB 2.0, and an internal speaker. It also added support for portrait display mode. It also had a redesigned screen bezel intended to improve the accuracy of its Wacom-enabled display by increasing the space between the bezel and edge of the display.

Originally it was only available running Windows XP Home or Pro editions. A version with Microsoft Windows XP Tablet PC Edition 2005 was introduced on January 4, 2006, taking advantage of handwriting recognition and improved navigation.

== OQO Model 02 ==
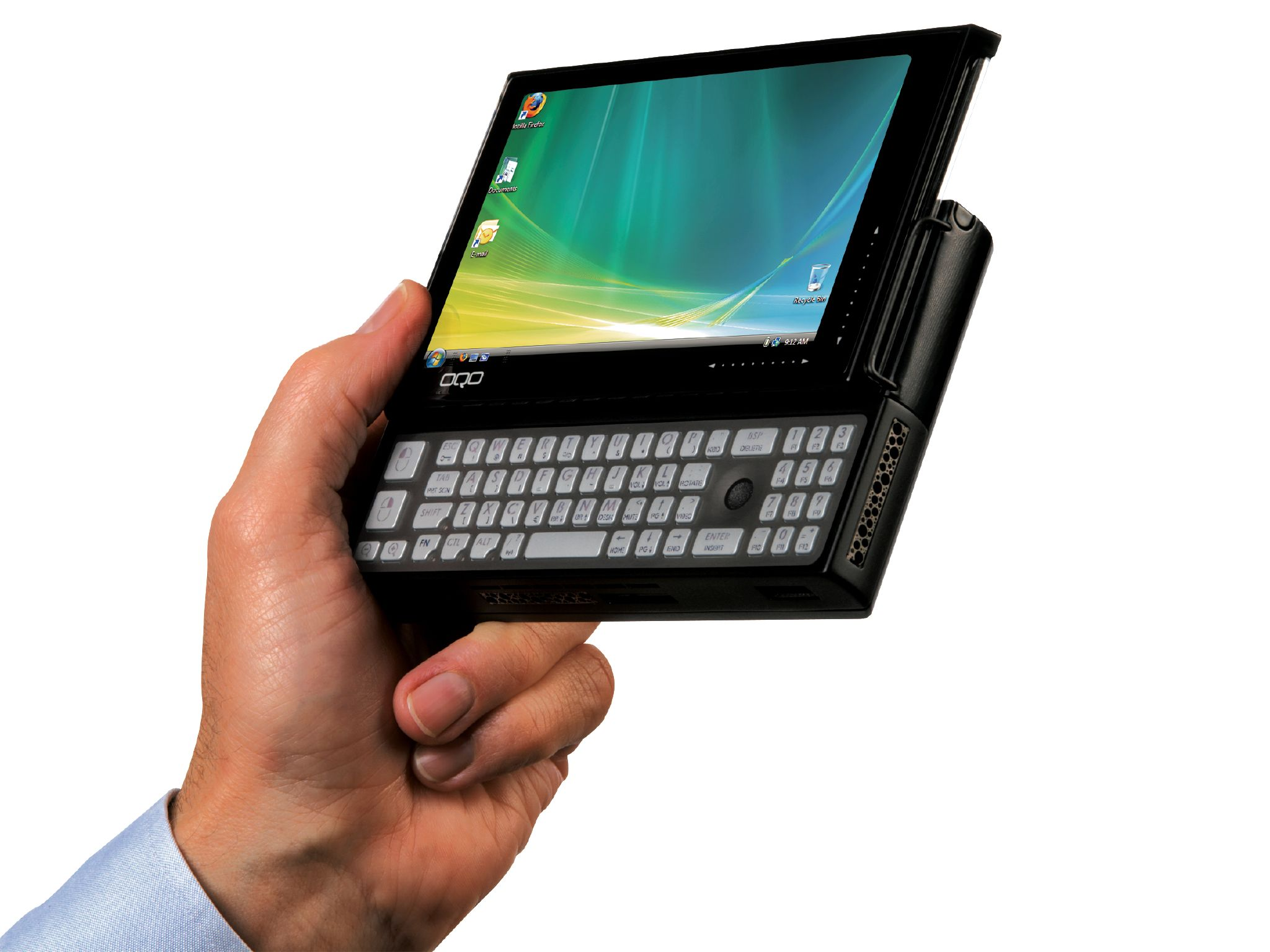
OQO Model 02

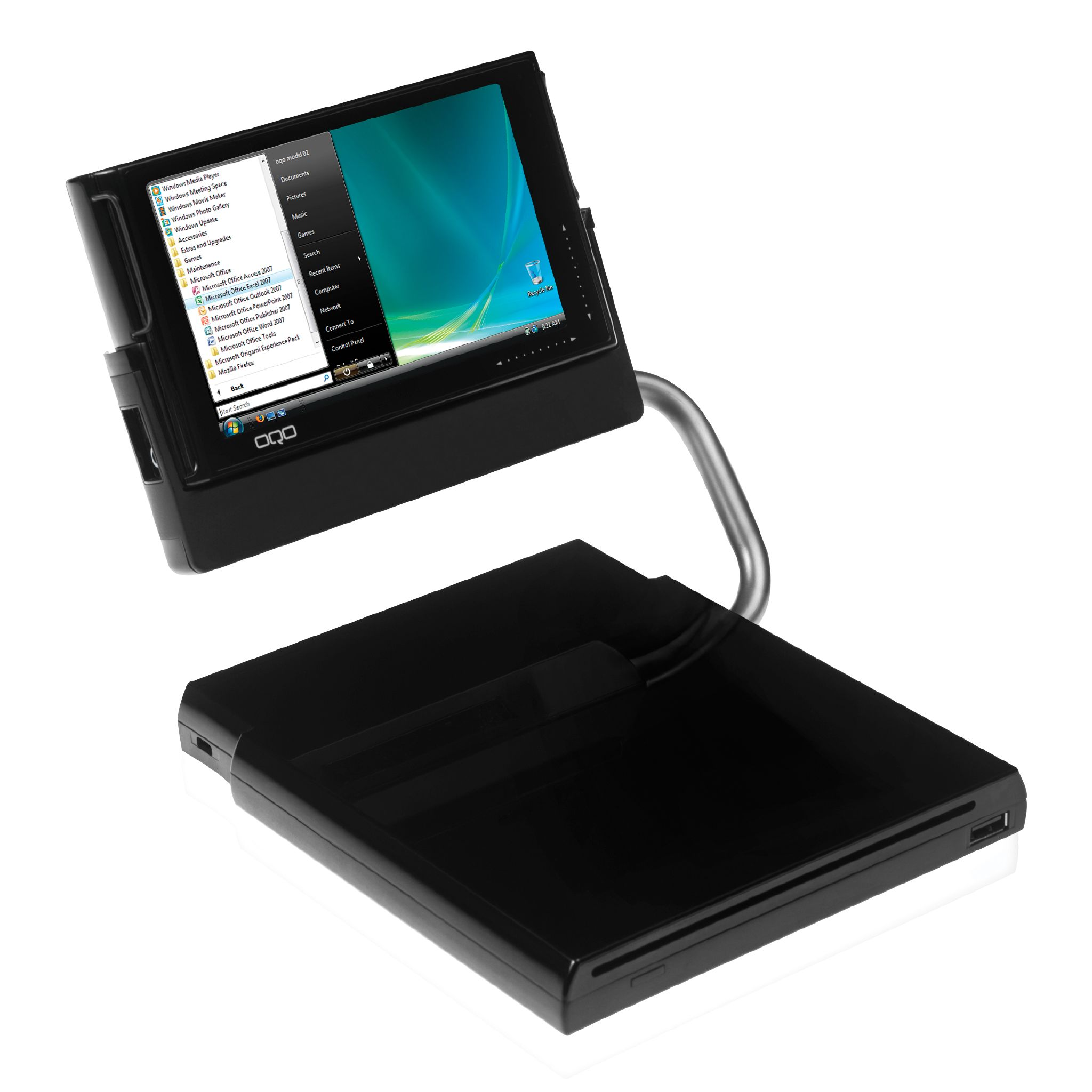
OQO Model 02 with docking station

The OQO model 02 was introduced by Bill Gates in January 2007 at the Consumer Electronics Show in Las Vegas. It weighed 1 pound (450 g) and was small enough to fit in a pocket; at the time it was the world's smallest fully-functional Windows Vista PC.

Like its predecessor, the model 02 was a handheld device that ran Windows (XP Professional or Vista Business.) It featured a new black casing and a backlit keyboard, a brighter 5 inch LCD screen, and 800 × 480 pixel display with an active digitizer for pen-based input.

Several models were introduced at the time with VIA C7-M ULV processors (1.2 GHz, or 1.5 GHz, 1.6GHz option being introduced in September) and choice of 512 MB or 1 GB of RAM. 32GB solid-state drive (SSD) or standard hard drives from 40 to 120 GB were available. Also included were Bluetooth 2.0, 802.11a/b/g WiFi, USB 2.0, a 3.5 mm x 1 line-out/line-in audio jack and an HDMI-out port. The model 02 also offered optional integrated EV-DO mobile broadband with choice of Verizon or Sprint as service provider.

Advanced security features were also provided, including an on-board Trusted Platform Module, and thanks to the VIA C7-M's built-in Padlock features, hardware-level encryption, hashing and random number generation functions.

The model 02 also had the ability to zoom to 800 × and 800 × interpolated modes, horizontal/vertical screen rotation, and a sensor that automatically protected the hard drive in case of a drop. Accessories included a docking station (with a DVD+-RW drive, HDMI and VGA video out, three USB 2.0 ports, and a 3.5 mm audio jack), an extended battery lasting up to six hours, and choice of a soft leatherette "executive" case or durable aluminum "stronghold" case.

The model 02 won the following awards:

- Stevie Award for Best New Product
- Japan’s 2007 Good Design Award
- LAPTOP Magazine, Ultimate Mobility Issue: LAPTOP Ultimate Choice 2007
- Business 2.0 Magazine: 4 Stars (Editor’s Choice) and "Our Picks for ... Ultramobile PCs."
- Microsoft: “2007 Windows Vista PC Innovation Award”
- Gizmodo: “The Best of ‘Best of CES 2007’ Lists” (Best Computer)
- Popular Science: Best of CES 2007
- Wired Magazine: CES Winners and Losers
- LAPTOP Magazine: 2007 Best of CES Awards
- LAPTOP Magazine Rating: 4 Stars
- PC Magazine Editor’s Rating: 4 Stars

== OQO Model e2 ==
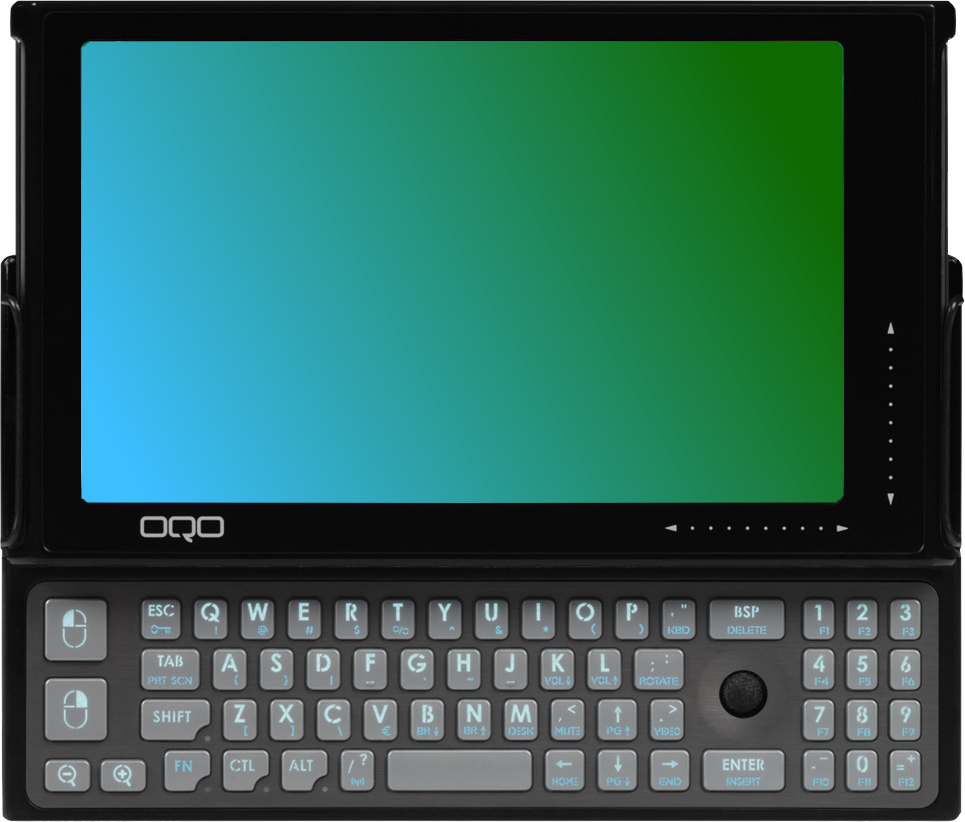
OQO Model e2

OQO in September 2007 announced the availability of the model e2 with embedded HSDPA mobile broadband capability, providing customers in Europe and Asia with widely available high-speed Internet connectivity.

The OQO model e2 with embedded HSDPA was designed specifically to meet international demand for anytime/anywhere computing with Internet access and networked PC applications in a pocketable and ergonomic design. It supported "open SIM" HSDPA (3.5G) as well as UMTS, EDGE, and GPRS.

It supported data access through UMTS/HSDPA at 2100 MHz, and was downward compatible with GPRS/EDGE networks at 900 MHz and 1800 MHz. Download speeds of up to 3.6 Mbit/s were supported.

The product was available SIM-free and network unlocked, allowing customers flexibility in selecting their preferred wireless operator and data plan. Users had a choice of tri-band wide-area wireless, WiFi 802.11a/b/g and Bluetooth 2.0.

The model 02 and model e2 came with a VIA C7-M ULV processor (1.6 GHz, 1.5 GHz, or 1.2 GHz), up to 1 GB of RAM, up to a 120 GB hard drive, with the option of a 32 GB or 64 GB solid-state drive, Bluetooth 2.0 (with enhanced data rate), tri-mode WiFi (802.11a/b/g) and optional 3G mobile broadband (EV-DO in the US, UMTS/HSDPA internationally).

== OQO Model 2+ ==
The Atom-based "model 2+" was unveiled at the Intel Developer Forum in San Francisco labeled as "OQO MID" as a "technology demonstration." The model 2+ was formally announced at CES 2009, and was available with a 1.33 GHz or 1.86 GHz Intel Atom processor, 2 GB RAM, Qualcomm Gobi global wireless internet, touchscreen, and was the first PC to feature an active matrix OLED display.

The projected shipping date was around May 22, 2009, but the product never shipped. OQO ceased production because of financial difficulties.

== Bankruptcy ==
The company confirmed that it had ceased operations in May 2009 because of financial difficulties. In April 2009, OQO started returning unrepaired in-warranty devices. In addition, the company stated that it would no longer offer any repair or service support, although third-party warranties remained in effect.

== OQO model specifications ==
Component	Model 01	Model 01+	Model 02	Model e2	Model 2+ (Pre-production)
CPU	Transmeta Crusoe TM5800; 1GHz		VIA C7-M ULV; 1.2 or 1.5GHz, 1.6GHz added later		Intel Atom Z540; 1.87GHz HT or Intel Atom Z520; 1.33GHz HT
RAM	256MB DDR	512MB DDR	512MB or 1GB DDR2		1GB or 2GB DDR2
Hard Drive	20GB HDD	30GB HDD	30/60 GB HDD, 80/120GB added later or 32GB SSD		120GB HDD or 60GB SSD
Display	5" Transflective; 800×480; LCD		5"; 800×480; LCD		5" active matrix 800×480; OLED or LCD
USB	1.1	2.0	2.0		2.0
Wi-Fi	802.11b		802.11a/b/g		
WWAN	n/a	n/a	EVDO from Sprint or Verizon	HSDPA	
Bluetooth	1.1		2.0		2.0
Wacom	Yes	Yes (Improved accuracy)	Yes		
GPU	Silicon Motion Lynx3DM+		VIA/S3 UniChrome Pro II		Intel GMA500
Removable Battery	4,000 mAh or 8,000 mAh		4,500 mAh or 9,000 mAh		4,500 mAh or 9,000 mAh
Battery Type	lithium polymer		lithium ion polymer		lithium ion polymer
Docking Cable	USB 1.1	USB 2.0	replaced by dongle or dock		
Dock	Zinc stand		Gloss Black w/ optical drive		
Ethernet	10BaseT	100BaseT	100BaseT	100BaseT	100BaseT
Dongle			RJ45 & VGA		unknown
Keyboard	57 key		58 key		
Weight	397g		413g*		

* Depends on configuration. OQO computers with standard battery, solid state drive, and no WWAN weigh approximately 413g (14.5 oz).
