= Joe Betts-LaCroix =

American scientist and entrepreneur

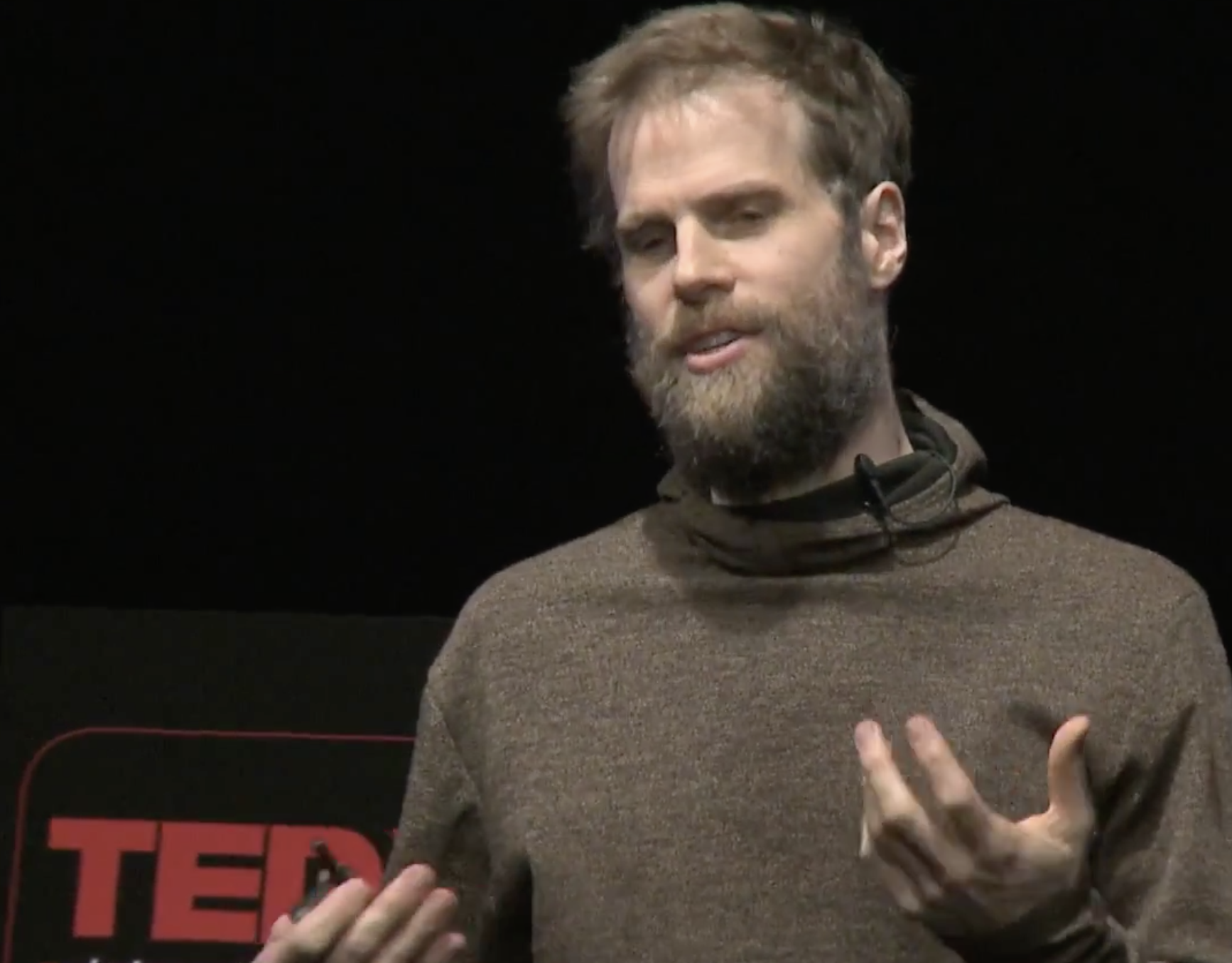
- Joe Betts-LaCroix in 2011
- Born: February 26, 1962 (age 64); Seattle
- Education: Harvard College
- Occupation: CEO of Retro Biosciences
- Website: evocator.org

Jonathan "Joe" Betts-LaCroix (born Jonathan Betts; February 26, 1962) is an American scientist and entrepreneur known for his discoveries in biophysics and for creating the world's smallest personal computer. He is working to optimize medical research priorities in the U.S.

== Early life and education ==
Joe Betts-LaCroix was born and raised in Oregon. He graduated from school with a D average, then spent the next six years living in a shared house with others whom he described as, "musicians, artists and weirdos". At this time, he did electronics, hardware and software work for local businesses. When his girlfriend went to Harvard, he decided to follow. After getting straight A's at a local college, he transferred to Harvard, where he studied environmental geoscience.

== Academics ==
Beginning in earth sciences at Harvard, Betts-LaCroix contributed to the field of long-term regulation of oxygen on Earth over multi-100 Million-year timespans, quantifying the effect of the burial efficiency of organic carbon as a feedback mechanism.

At MIT, he designed and built an autonomous, robotic system that enables research into ocean circulation patterns and climate change, by operating untended for up to one year at sea on battery power and collecting hyper-pure water samples at predetermined intervals.

In work at Caltech, Betts-LaCroix moved into biophysics, publishing a paper in Science that has been cited by more than 700 subsequent scientific works. In this work, he, along with David Beratan and José Onuchic, proved for the first time that electron-transfer rates in proteins are determined by the electron orbital interactions in the protein structure.

== Hardware ==
In 2000, Betts-LaCroix cofounded OQO, a computer hardware and software OEM credited by the Guinness World Records as having created the world's smallest Windows PC. This created a new category of mobile computing devices between PDAs and laptops, which were initially dubbed the "Ultra Personal Computer", and which subsequently became known as the "Netbook". The device won many awards for its innovation, aesthetics and functionality.

After OQO, Betts-Lacroix was active in Silicon Valley as a lecturer and mentor for CEOs of start up companies.

== Biotechnology & biomedicine ==
Betts-LaCroix has participated in the Quantified Self movement since the beginning, and has given numerous presentations on aspects of self experimentation and tracking, including experiments in the 28-Hour day.

In 2010, he joined startup Halcyon Molecular to lead its automation efforts. Halcyon, funded by, among others, Elon Musk and Peter Thiel, attempted to sequence human DNA using electron microscopes. The underlying goal of Halcyon's work was to make meaningful progress in understanding human biology in order to improve medicine.

Following the theme of improving medicine, Betts-LaCroix founded the Health Extension Foundation in 2012. The efforts of the people working in Health Extension are motivated by recognizing that

1. Most healthcare money treats age-related diseases;
2. Aging is the single biggest risk factor for these diseases;
3. But funding to address the biochemical processes of aging is less than 0.01% of healthcare spending—and correcting this missed opportunity to optimally assign medical research and translation priorities.

In 2013, Betts-LaCroix cofounded Vium, which has raised $33M to accelerate the development of new medical therapies by automating in-vivo research. Vium launched publicly in 2016, and was later acquired by Recursion in 2020.

Betts-LaCroix is also a biotech angel investor in such companies as StemCentrx, Recursion Pharma and Spring Discovery, as well as a part-time contributor at Y Combinator.

In 2020, Betts-LaCroix cofounded Retro Biosciences, which emerged out of stealth with $180 million in funding from OpenAI CEO Sam Altman to focus on extending healthy human lifespans. Retro works on autophagy, the rejuvenation of blood plasma and on partial cell reprogramming.

== See also ==
- Aging-associated diseases
