= Everun Note =

Subnotebook/netbook computer designed by Raon Digital

- Developer: Raon Digital
- Type: Subnotebook/Netbook
- Media: 16 / 24 GB Flash, 30 / 60 / 80 GB HDD
- Operating system: Microsoft Windows XP; Ubuntu Linux
- CPU: 1200 MHz AMD Turion 64 X2 1 MB L2 cache Amd Sempron 3600
- Memory: 1 GB DDR2 SDRAM RAM
- Display: 7 inch (diagonal) TFT LCD with LEDbacklight; 1024×600 pixels (pels)
- Graphics: ATI RS690E 64 Mb DDR2
- Input: Keyboard; Touch Screen; Microphone; 1.3 megapixel video camera
- Connectivity: 802.11b/g wireless LAN; Bluetooth 2.0 with EDR; 2 USB 2.0 ports MMC/SD card reader
- Power: 1 cell 5200mah
- Website: http://www.raondigital.com/fnt_english/evn01.asp

The Everun Note is a subnotebook / netbook computer designed by Raon Digital. At the time of its introduction, it was noted for the performance of its Turion 64 X2 dual core processor, getting high scores in benchmark testing. The Everun Note is also noted for being particularly small, given the relatively high resolution of the screen (1024x600 pixels) and taking the approach of using a touch screen instead of the touchpad that is commonly found on budget netbooks.

Retailers in the U.S. are offering the Linux model pre-installed with an unspecified Ubuntu release.
