= Raon Digital =

Former Korean company

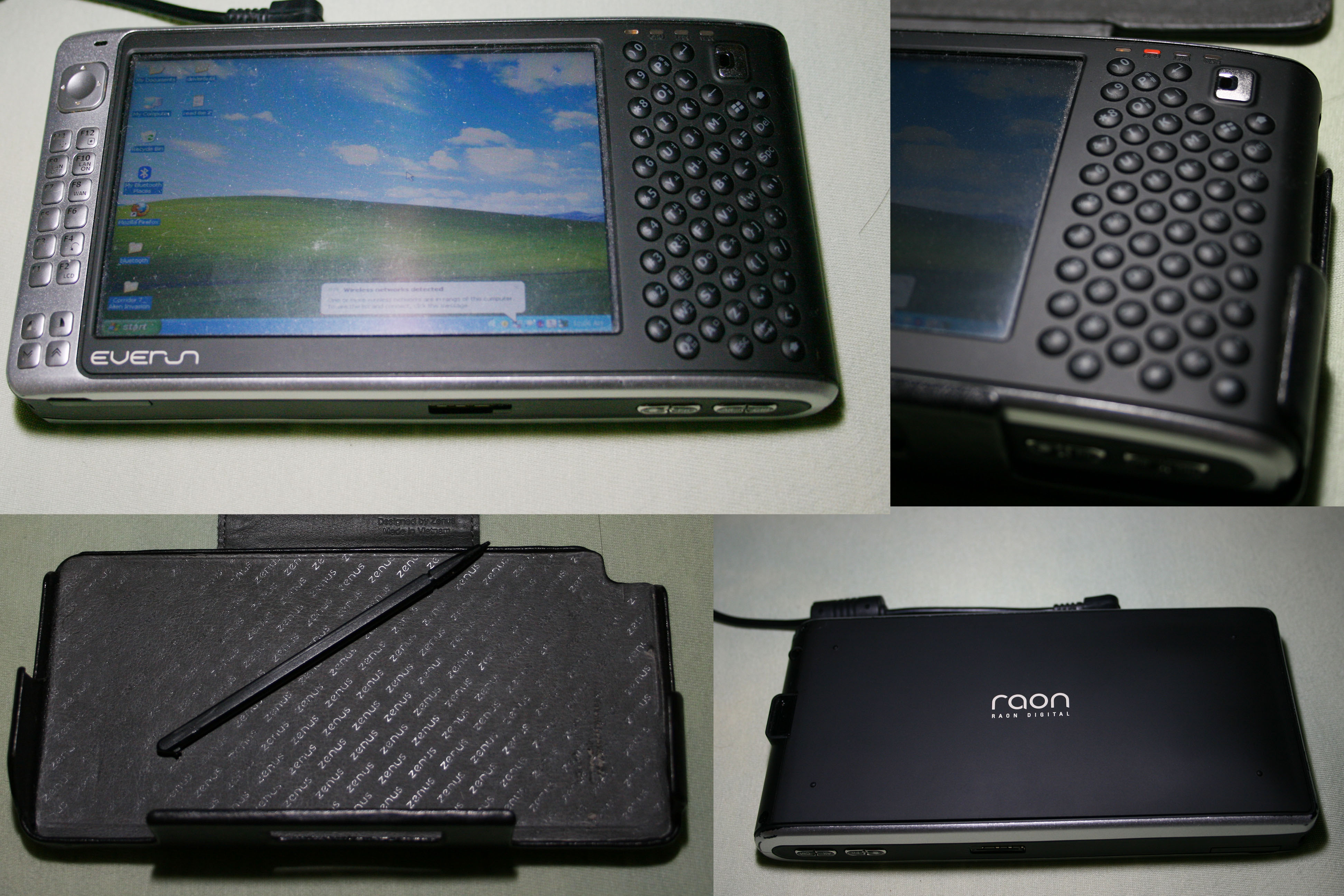
Raon Digital Everun

Raon Digital was a Korean company that manufactured Ultra-Mobile PCs (UMPCs) such as the Raon Vega, Raon Everun and Everun Note. The company closed in 2009.
