= Ockel Sirius B =

Pocket PC

- Developer: Tim Haaksma
- Manufacturer: Ockel Products
- Type: Pocket computer
- Released: October 28, 2015
- Operating system: Windows 10
- Power: DC 5V 2A
- Website: www.ockelcomputers.com

Ockel Sirius B is a pocket PC. The makers claim it is the smallest portable Windows 10 PC. The Ockel Sirius B is a co-production of Ockel Products and Avanca International, both based in The Hague, Netherlands.

== Overview ==
The Sirius B was launched on October 28, 2015. It has quad-core Intel Atom processor, 2 GB of RAM, 32 GB of internal storage, and Intel HD graphics.

Ockel Products raised $361,331 for the production of the Ockel Sirius B by crowd funding through Indiegogo. As of January 2020, both the first version of the Sirius B and the Ockel Sirius B Black Cherry are available.

== See also ==
- List of computer hardware manufacturers
