= Wireless WAN =

Form of wireless network

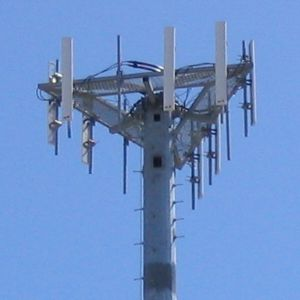
Top of cellular transmitting tower in the United States

Wireless wide area network (WWAN) is a form of wireless network. The larger size of a wide area network compared to a local area network requires differences in technology. Wireless networks of different sizes deliver data in the form of telephone calls, web pages, and video streaming.

A WWAN often differs from wireless local area network (WLAN) by using mobile telecommunication cellular network technologies such as 2G, 3G, 4G LTE, and 5G to transfer data. It is sometimes referred to as mobile broadband. These technologies are offered regionally, nationwide, or even globally and are provided by a wireless service provider. WWAN connectivity allows a user with a laptop and a WWAN card to surf the web, check email, or connect to a virtual private network (VPN) from anywhere within the regional boundaries of cellular service. Various computers can have integrated WWAN capabilities.

A WWAN may also be a closed network that covers a large geographic area. For example, a mesh network or MANET with nodes on buildings, towers, trucks, and planes could also be considered a WWAN.

A WWAN may also be a low-power, low-bit-rate wireless WAN (LPWAN), intended to carry small packets of information between things, often in the form of battery-operated sensors.

Since radio communications systems do not provide a physically secure connection path, WWANs typically incorporate encryption and authentication methods to make them more secure. Some of the early GSM encryption techniques were flawed, and security experts have issued warnings that cellular communication, including WWAN, is no longer secure. UMTS (3G) encryption was developed later and has yet to be broken.

== See also ==
- Private Shared Wireless Network
- Wide area network
- Wireless LAN
- Wi-Fi
- Satellite Internet access
