= Tick–tock model =

Production model by Intel

Tick–tock was a production model adopted in 2007 by chip manufacturer Intel. Under this model, every new process technology was first used to manufacture a die shrink of a proven microarchitecture (tick), followed by a new microarchitecture on the now-proven process (tock). It was replaced by the process–architecture–optimization model, which was announced in 2016 and is like a tick–tock cycle followed by an optimization phase. More generally, tick–tock is an engineering model which refreshes one half of a binary system each release cycle.

== History ==
Every "tick" represented a shrinking of the process technology of the previous microarchitecture (with minor changes, commonly to the caches, and rarely introducing new instructions, as with Broadwell in late 2014) and every "tock" designated a new microarchitecture. These occurred roughly every year to 18 months.

Due to the slowing rate of process improvements, in 2014 Intel created a "tock refresh" of a tock in the form of a smaller update to the microarchitecture not considered a new generation in and of itself. In March 2016, Intel announced in a Form 10-K report that it would always do this in future, deprecating the tick–tock cycle in favor of a three-step process–architecture–optimization model, under which three generations of processors are produced under a single manufacturing process, with the third generation out of three focusing on optimization.

After introducing the Skylake architecture on a 14 nm process in 2015, its first optimization was Kaby Lake in 2016. Intel then announced a second optimization, Coffee Lake, in 2017 making a total of four generations at 14 nm before the Palm Cove die shrink to 10 nm in 2018.

== Roadmap ==
=== Pentium 4 / Core / Xeon Roadmap ===
Pentium 4 / Core / Xeon Roadmap
Change (step)	Fabrication process	Micro- architecture	Code names for step	Intel Generation Desktop/Mobile	Intel Generation Xeon	Intel Microcode shortcut(s) Desktop/WS	Intel Microcode shortcut(s) Xeon/Server	Release date	Processors						
Change (step)	Fabrication process	Micro- architecture	Code names for step	Intel Generation Desktop/Mobile	Intel Generation Xeon	Intel Microcode shortcut(s) Desktop/WS	Intel Microcode shortcut(s) Xeon/Server	Release date	8P/4P Server	4P/2P Server/WS	Embedded Xeon	1P Xeon	Enthusiast/WS	Desktop	Mobile
Tick (new fabrica- tion process)	65 nm	P6, NetBurst	Yonah (P6), Presler (NetBurst), Cedar Mill (NetBurst)	—N/a				1995-11-1 (P6), 2000-11-20 (NetBurst)	—N/a		—N/a	—N/a	Presler (NetBurst)	Cedar Mill (NetBurst)	Yonah (P6)
Tock (new micro- architecture)	65 nm	Core	Merom	—N/a				2006-07-27	Tigerton	Woodcrest; Clovertown	—N/a	—N/a	Kentsfield	Conroe	Merom
Tick	45 nm	Core	Penryn	—N/a				2007-11-11	Dunnington	Harpertown	—N/a	—N/a	Yorkfield	Wolfdale	Penryn
Tock	45 nm	Nehalem	Nehalem	1	—N/a	NHM	—N/a	2008-11-17	Beckton	Gainestown	—N/a	Lynnfield	Bloomfield	Lynnfield	Clarksfield
Tick	32 nm	Nehalem	Westmere	1	—N/a	WSM	—N/a	2010-01-04	Westmere-EX	Westmere-EP	—N/a	—N/a	Gulftown	Clarkdale	Arrandale
Tock	32 nm	Sandy Bridge	Sandy Bridge	2	1 (E3/E5)	SNB	JKT (Jaketown)	2011-01-09	Skipped	Sandy Bridge-EP	Gladden	Sandy Bridge	Sandy Bridge-E	Sandy Bridge	Sandy Bridge-M
Tick	22 nm	Sandy Bridge	Ivy Bridge	3	2 (E3/E5/E7)	IVB	IVT (Ivytown)	2012-04-29	Ivy Bridge-EX	Ivy Bridge-EP	Gladden	Ivy Bridge	Ivy Bridge-E	Ivy Bridge	Ivy Bridge-M
Tock	22 nm	Haswell	Haswell	4	3 (E3/E5/E7)	HSW, CRW (Crystal Well) with Iris Pro	HSX	2013-06-02	Haswell-EX	Haswell-EP	—N/a	Haswell-DT	Haswell-E	Haswell-DT	Haswell-MB (notebooks); Haswell-LP (ultrabooks)
Refresh	22 nm	Haswell	Haswell Refresh, Devil's Canyon	4	—N/a	HSW, CRW (Crystal Well) with Iris Pro	—N/a	2014-05-11, 2014-06-02	No server version released					Devil's Canyon	No mobile version released
Tick (Process)	14 nm	Haswell	Broadwell	5	4 (E3/E5/E7)	BDW	BDX	2014-09-05	Broadwell-EX	Broadwell-EP	Broadwell-DE	Broadwell-DT	Broadwell-E	Broadwell-DT	Broadwell-H; Broadwell-U; Broadwell-Y
Tock (Architecture)	14 nm	Skylake	Skylake	6	5 (E3); 1 (SP); W-2100; W-31xx	SKL; SKL-S; SKL-X; SKL-H; SKL-U; SKL-Y; SKL-D; SKL-DT	SKX	2015-08-05	Skylake-SP		Skylake-DE	Skylake-D/DT/H	Skylake-X	Skylake	Skylake-H; Skylake-U; Skylake-Y
Optimization (Refresh)	14 nm	Skylake	Kaby Lake	7	6 (E3)	KBL	—N/a	2017-01-03	Only 1P server (Xeon E3) version released			Kaby Lake-DT/H cores: 4 (4/8)	Kaby Lake-X	Kaby Lake	Kaby Lake-H; Kaby Lake-U; Kaby Lake-Y
Optimization (Refresh)	14 nm	Skylake	Kaby Lake R	8	—N/a	KBL-R	—N/a	2017-08-21	Only mobile version released						Kaby Lake R
Optimization (Refresh)	14 nm	Skylake	Coffee Lake	8	E-2100	CFL; CFL-S; CFL-E; CFL-H; CFL-U	—N/a	2017-10-05	Only 1P server (Xeon E) version released		Coffee Lake-H	Coffee Lake-S WS (Coffee Lake-E)	No WS version released	Coffee Lake-S	Coffee Lake-H; Coffee Lake-U
Optimization (Refresh)	14 nm	Skylake	Whiskey Lake, Amber Lake	8	—N/a	WHL; AML	—N/a	2018-08-28	Only mobile version released						Whiskey Lake-U; Amber Lake-Y
Optimization (Refresh)	14 nm	Skylake	Skylake (Skylake-X Refresh)	9	—N/a	?	—N/a	2018-10-08	Only WS version released				Skylake X	Only WS version released	
Optimization (Refresh)	14 nm	Skylake	Coffee Lake (Coffee Lake Refresh)	9	E-2200	CFL-R; CFL-ER; CFL-HR	—N/a	2018-10-08, 2019-04-23	Only 1P server (Xeon E) version released			Coffee Lake-S WS (Coffee Lake-ER)	No WS version released	Coffee Lake-R	Coffee Lake-H Refresh
Optimization (Refresh)	14 nm	Skylake	Cascade Lake	10	2 (SP); W-2200; W-3200	CSL	CXL	2019-04-02	Cascade Lake-SP		Cascade Lake-AP	—N/a	Cascade Lake-W; Cascade Lake-X	Only server / WS version released	
Optimization (Refresh)	14 nm	Skylake	Comet Lake, Amber Lake	10	—N/a	CML; AML	—N/a	2019-08-21	No server version released				Comet Lake-W	Comet Lake-S	Comet Lake-H; Comet Lake-U; Amber Lake-Y
Optimization (Refresh)	14 nm	Skylake	Cascade Lake (Cascade Lake Refresh)	—N/a	2 (SP)	—N/a	?	2020-02-24	Cascade Lake R		Only server version released				
Optimization (Refresh)	14 nm	Skylake	Cooper Lake	—N/a	3 (SP)	—N/a	CPL; CPL-SP	2020-06-18	Cooper Lake-SP	Only 8P/4P server version released					
Architecture	14 nm	Cypress Cove	Rocket Lake	11	E-2300	RKL	—N/a	2021-03-30	—N/a			Rocket Lake-E	Rocket Lake-W	Rocket Lake-S	—N/a
Process	10 nm	Palm Cove	Cannon Lake	8	—N/a	CNL	—N/a	2018-05-16	Only mobile version released						Cannon Lake-U
Architecture	10 nm	Sunny Cove	Ice Lake	10	3 (SP)	ICL	ICX; ICL-SP	2019-08-01	—N/a	Ice Lake-SP (2021-04-06)	Ice Lake-D (April 2021)	—N/a			Ice Lake-U; Ice Lake-Y
Optimization	10 nm	Willow Cove	Tiger Lake	11	—N/a	TGL	—N/a	2020-09-02	Only mobile version released						Tiger Lake-H35; Tiger Lake-UP3; Tiger Lake-UP4
Architecture	Intel 7	Golden Cove	Alder Lake	12	—N/a	ADL	—N/a	2021-11-04	No server / WS version released					Alder Lake-S	Alder Lake-HX; Alder Lake-H; Alder Lake-P; Alder Lake-U
Architecture	Intel 7	Golden Cove	Sapphire Rapids	—N/a	4 (SP); W-2400; W-3400	—N/a	SPR	2023-01-10	Sapphire Rapids-SP	Sapphire Rapids-HBM; Sapphire Rapids-SP	—N/a		Sapphire Rapids-WS	Only server / WS version released	
Optimization	Intel 7	Raptor Cove	Raptor Lake	13	—N/a	RPL	—N/a	2022-10-20	No server / WS version released					Raptor Lake-S	Raptor Lake-HX; Raptor Lake-H; Raptor Lake-P; Raptor Lake-U
Optimization	Intel 7	Raptor Cove	Raptor Lake (Raptor Lake Refresh)	14	E-2400	RPL-R	—N/a	2023-10-17	Only 1P server (Xeon E) version released			Raptor Lake-E	—N/a	Raptor Lake-S Refresh	—N/a
Optimization	Intel 7	Raptor Cove	Raptor Lake (Raptor Lake Refresh)	14	—N/a	RPL-R	—N/a	2024-01-08	Mobile processors refreshed						Raptor Lake-HX Refresh
Optimization	Intel 7	Raptor Cove	Raptor Lake (Raptor Lake Refresh)	Core Series 1	—N/a	RPL-R	—N/a	2024-01-08	Mobile processors refreshed						Raptor Lake-U Refresh
Optimization	Intel 7	Raptor Cove	Emerald Rapids	—N/a	Xeon 5 (SP)	—N/a	EMR	2023-12-14	Emerald Rapids-SP		Only server version released				
Tick	Intel 4	Redwood Cove	Meteor Lake	Core Ultra (Series 1)	—N/a	MTL	—N/a	2023-12-14	Only mobile version released					Meteor Lake-S; Meteor Lake-PS	Meteor Lake-H; Meteor Lake-U
Tick	Intel 3	Redwood Cove	Granite Rapids	—N/a	Xeon 6 (SP)	—N/a	GNR	2024-09-24	—N/a	Granite Rapids-AP	—N/a	Only server / WS version released			
Tick	Intel 3	Redwood Cove	Granite Rapids	—N/a	Xeon 6 (SP)	—N/a	GNR	2025 Q1	Granite Rapids-SP		—N/a	Only server / WS version released			
Tick	Intel 3	Redwood Cove	Granite Rapids	—N/a	Xeon 6 (SP)	—N/a	GNR	2025	—N/a		Granite Rapids-D	Only server / WS version released			
Tick	TSMC N3B	Lion Cove	Arrow Lake	15 (informally); Core Ultra 200S; Core Ultra (Series 2)	—N/a	ARL	—N/a	2024-10-03	No server / WS version released					Arrow Lake-S; Arrow Lake-SK	—N/a
Tick	TSMC N3B	Lion Cove	Arrow Lake	Core Ultra 200H; Core Ultra 200HX; Intel Core Ultra H & HX Series	—N/a	ARL	—N/a	2025 Q1	No server / WS version released					Arrow Lake-R; Arrow Lake-K; Arrow Lake-KF	Arrow Lake-HX; Arrow Lake-H
Tick	TSMC N3B	Lion Cove	Lunar Lake	Core Ultra 200V; Core Ultra (Series 2)	—N/a	LNL	—N/a	2024-09-03	Only mobile version released						Lunar Lake-V; Lunar Lake-MX
Change (step)	Fabrication process	Micro- architecture	Code names for step	Intel Generation Desktop	Intel Generation Xeon	Intel Microcode shortcut(s) Desktop/WS	Intel Microcode shortcut(s) Xeon/Server	Release date	8P/4P Server	4P/2P Server/WS	Embedded Xeon	1P Xeon	Enthusiast/WS	Desktop	Mobile
Change (step)	Fabrication process	Micro- architecture	Code names for step	Intel Generation Desktop	Intel Generation Xeon	Intel Microcode shortcut(s) Desktop/WS	Intel Microcode shortcut(s) Xeon/Server	Release date	Processors						

=== Atom roadmap ===
With Silvermont Intel tried to start tick-tock in Atom architecture but problems with the 10 nm process prevented it.

In the table below instead of tick-tock steps process-architecture-optimization are used. There is no official confirmation that Intel uses process-architecture-optimization for Atom, but it enables us to understand what changes happened in each generation.

Atom roadmap
Change	Fabrication process	Micro- architecture (Abbr.)	Code names for step	Release date	Processors/SoCs						
Change	Fabrication process	Micro- architecture (Abbr.)	Code names for step	Release date	MID, Smartphone	Tablet	Netbook	Nettop	Embedded	Server	CE
Process / architecture	45 nm	Bonnell (BNL)	Bonnell	2008	Silverthorne	—N/a	Diamondville		—N/a	—N/a	—N/a
Optimization	45 nm	Bonnell (BNL)	Bonnell	2010	Lincroft		Pineview		Tunnel Creek; Stellarton	—N/a	Sodaville; Groveland
Process	32 nm	Bonnell (BNL)	Saltwell	2011	Medfield (Penwell & Lexington) & Clover Trail+ (Cloverview)	Clover Trail (Cloverview)	Cedar Trail (Cedarview)		—N/a	Centerton & Briarwood	Berryville
Process / architecture	22 nm	Silvermont (SLM)	Silvermont	2013	Merrifield (Tangier) & Moorefield (Anniedale) & Slayton	Bay Trail-T (Valleyview)	Bay Trail-M (Valleyview)	Bay Trail-D (Valleyview)	Bay Trail-I (Valleyview)	Avoton; Rangeley	Unknown
Process	14 nm	Silvermont (SLM)	Airmont	2014	Binghamton & Riverton	Cherry Trail-T (Cherryview)	Braswell			Denverton; Cancelled	Unknown
Architecture	14 nm	Goldmont (GLM)	Goldmont	2016	Broxton Cancelled	Broxton Cancelled; Apollo Lake	Apollo Lake	Apollo Lake	Unknown	Denverton	Unknown
Architecture	14 nm	Goldmont Plus (GLM+, GLP)	Goldmont Plus	2017	Unknown	Gemini Lake	Gemini Lake	Gemini Lake	Unknown	Unknown	Unknown
Optimization	14 nm	Goldmont Plus (GLM+, GLP)	Goldmont Plus	2019	Unknown	Gemini Lake Refresh	Gemini Lake Refresh	Gemini Lake Refresh	Unknown	Unknown	Unknown
Process / architecture	10 nm	Tremont	Tremont	2020	Unknown	Jasper Lake	Jasper Lake	Jasper Lake	Elkhart Lake	Snow Ridge	Unknown
Architecture	Intel 7	Gracemont	Gracemont	2021	Unknown	Unknown	Alder Lake & Raptor Lake (hybrid)			Unknown	Unknown
Process / architecture	Intel 4	Crestmont	Crestmont	2023	Unknown	Unknown	Meteor Lake (hybrid)			Sierra Forest-SP; Sierra Forest-AP	Unknown

Note: There is further the Xeon Phi. It has up to now undergone four development steps with a current top model that got the code name Knights Landing (shortcut: KNL; the predecessor code names all had the leading term Knights in their name) that is derived from the Silvermont architecture as used for the Intel Atom series but realized in a shrunk 14 nm (FinFET) technology. In 2018, Intel announced that Knights Landing and all further Xeon Phi CPU models were discontinued. However, Intel's Sierra Forest and subsequent Atom-based Xeon CPUs are likely a spiritual successor to Xeon Phi.

=== Both ===
Atom (ULV)		Node name	Pentium/Core						
Microarch.	Step	Node name	Microarch.	Step					
		600 nm	P6	Pentium Pro (133 MHz)					
		500 nm	P6	Pentium Pro (150 MHz)					
		350 nm	P6	Pentium Pro (166–200 MHz)					
		350 nm	P6	Klamath					
		250 nm	P6	Deschutes					
		250 nm	P6	Katmai	NetBurst				
		180 nm	P6	Coppermine	Willamette				
		130 nm	P6	Tualatin	Northwood				
		130 nm	Pentium M (P6)	Banias	Northwood		NetBurst(HT)		NetBurst(×2)
		90 nm	Pentium M (P6)	Dothan	Prescott	⇨	Prescott‑2M	⇨	Smithfield
		90 nm	Pentium M (P6)	Dothan	~~Tejas~~	→	⇩	→	~~Cedarmill (Tejas)~~
		65 nm	Pentium M (P6)	Yonah	~~Nehalem (NetBurst)~~		Cedar Mill	⇨	Presler
		65 nm	Core	Merom	4 cores on mainstream desktop, DDR3 introduced				
Bonnell	Bonnell	45 nm	Core	Penryn					
Bonnell	Bonnell	45 nm	Nehalem	Nehalem	HT reintroduced, integrated MC, PCH; L3-cache introduced, 256 KB L2-cache/core				
Bonnell	Saltwell	32 nm	Nehalem	Westmere	Introduced GPU on same package and AES-NI				
Bonnell	Saltwell	32 nm	Sandy Bridge	Sandy Bridge	On-die ring bus, no more non-UEFI motherboards				
Silvermont	Silvermont	22 nm	Sandy Bridge	Ivy Bridge					
Silvermont	Silvermont	22 nm	Haswell	Haswell	Fully integrated voltage regulator				
Silvermont	Airmont	14 nm	Haswell	Broadwell					
Silvermont	Airmont	14 nm	Skylake	Skylake	DDR4 introduced on mainstream desktop				
Goldmont		14 nm	Skylake	Kaby Lake					
Goldmont		14 nm	Skylake	Coffee Lake	6 cores on mainstream desktop				
Goldmont		14 nm	Skylake	Amber Lake	Mobile-only				
Goldmont Plus		14 nm	Skylake	Whiskey Lake	Mobile-only				
Goldmont Plus		14 nm	Skylake	Coffee Lake Refresh	8 cores on mainstream desktop				
Goldmont Plus		14 nm	Skylake	Comet Lake	10 cores on mainstream desktop				
Goldmont Plus		14 nm	Sunny Cove	Cypress Cove (Rocket Lake)	Backported Sunny Cove microarchitecture for 14 nm				
Tremont		10 nm	Skylake	Palm Cove (Cannon Lake)	Mobile-only				
Tremont		10 nm	Sunny Cove	Sunny Cove (Ice Lake)	512 KB L2-cache/core				
Tremont		10 nm	Sunny Cove	Willow Cove (Tiger Lake)	X^{e} graphics engine				
Gracemont		Intel 7 (10 nm ESF)	Golden Cove	Golden Cove (Alder Lake)	Hybrid, DDR5, PCIe 5.0				
Gracemont		Intel 7 (10 nm ESF)	Golden Cove	Raptor Cove (Raptor Lake)					
Crestmont		Intel 4	Redwood Cove	Meteor Lake	Mobile-only; NPU, chiplet architecture				
Crestmont		Intel 3	Redwood Cove	Arrow Lake-U					
Skymont		TSMC N3B	Lion Cove	Lunar Lake	Low power mobile only (9–30 W)				
Skymont		TSMC N3B	Lion Cove	Arrow Lake					
Darkmont		Intel 18A	Cougar Cove	Panther Lake					
Arctic Wolf		Intel 18A and/or TSMC N2P	Coyote Cove	Nova Lake					

== See also ==
- List of Intel CPU microarchitectures
- Speculative execution CPU vulnerabilities
