= List of Intel CPU microarchitectures =

The following is a list of Intel CPU microarchitectures. Intel has produced many generations of CPU microarchitectures since the 1970s, spanning x86 processors for desktop, mobile, and server markets. Additional details about Intel's manufacturing and architecture strategy can be found in Intel's tick–tock model and the process–architecture–optimization model, which describe how Intel historically alternated between shrinking manufacturing processes and introducing new architectures. See also Template:Intel processor roadmap for planned future architectures.

== x86 microarchitectures ==
x86 microarchitectures
Year	Microarchitecture	Pipeline stages	Max clock (MHz)	Process node
1978	8086 (8086, 8088)	2	5	3000 nm
1982	186 (80186, 80188)	2	25	3000 nm
1982	286 (80286)	3	25	1500 nm
1985	386 (80386)	6	33	1500 nm
1989	486 (80486)	5	100	1000 nm
1993	P5 (Pentium)	5	200	800, 600, 350 nm
1995	P6 (Pentium Pro, Pentium II)	14 (17 with load & store/retire)	450	500, 350, 250 nm
1997	P5 (Pentium MMX)	6	233	350 nm
1999	P6 (Pentium III)	12 (15 with load & store/retire)	1400	250, 180, 130 nm
2000	NetBurst (Pentium 4) (Willamette)	20 unified with branch prediction	2000	180 nm
2002	NetBurst (Pentium 4) (Northwood, Gallatin)	20 unified with branch prediction	3466	130 nm
2003	Pentium M (Banias, Dothan); Enhanced Pentium M (Yonah)	10 (12 with fetch/retire)	2333	130, 90, 65 nm
2004	NetBurst (Pentium 4, Pentium D) (Prescott)	31 unified with branch prediction	3800	90, 65 nm
2006	Intel Core	12 (14 with fetch/retire)	3000	65 nm
2007	Penryn (die shrink)	12 (14 with fetch/retire)	3333	45 nm
2008	Nehalem	20 unified (14 without miss prediction)	3600	45 nm
2008	Bonnell	16 (20 with prediction miss)	2100	45 nm
2010	Westmere (die shrink)	20 unified (14 without miss prediction)	3866	32 nm
2011	Saltwell (die shrink)	16 (20 with prediction miss)	2130	32 nm
2011	Sandy Bridge	14 (16 with fetch/retire)	4000	32 nm
2012	Ivy Bridge (die shrink)	14 (16 with fetch/retire)	4100	22 nm
2013	Silvermont	14–17 (16–19 with fetch/retire)	2670	22 nm
2013	Haswell	14 (16 with fetch/retire)	4400	22 nm
2014	Broadwell (die shrink)	14 (16 with fetch/retire)	3700	14 nm
2015	Airmont (die shrink)	14–17 (16–19 with fetch/retire)	2640	14 nm
2015	Skylake	14 (16 with fetch/retire)	5300	14 nm
2016	Goldmont	20 unified with branch prediction	2600	14 nm
2017	Goldmont Plus	20 unified with branch prediction (?)	2800	14 nm
2018	Palm Cove	14 (16 with fetch/retire)	3200	10 nm
2019	Sunny Cove	12–19 (misprediction)	4100	10 nm
2020	Tremont	20 unified	3300	10 nm
2020	Willow Cove	12 unified	5300	10 nm
2021	Cypress Cove	12 unified	5300	14 nm
2021	Golden Cove	12 unified	5500	Intel 7
2021	Gracemont	20 unified with misprediction penalty	4300	Intel 7
2022	Raptor Cove	12 unified	6200	Intel 7
2023	Redwood Cove	10 unified		Intel 4, Intel 3
2023	Crestmont			Intel 4, TSMC N6, Intel 3
2024	Lion Cove	10 unified		TSMC N3B
2024	Skymont	16 unified		TSMC N3B
2026	Cougar Cove			Intel 18A
2026	Panther Cove			Intel 18A
2026	Darkmont			Intel 18A
2026	Coyote Cove			
2026	Arctic Wolf			
2027	Griffin Cove			
Note: Atom/Power efficient microarchitectures are in Italic

=== 16-bit ===
8086
first x86 processor; initially a temporary substitute for the iAPX 432 to compete with Motorola, Zilog, and National Semiconductor and to top the successful Z80. The 8088 version, with an 8-bit bus, was used in the original IBM Personal Computer.
186
included a DMA controller, interrupt controller, timers, and chip select logic. A small number of additional instructions. The 80188 was a version with an 8-bit bus.
286
first x86 processor with protected mode including segmentation based virtual memory management. Performance improved by a factor of 3 to 4 over 8086. Included instructions relating to protected mode. The 80286 had a 24-bit address bus.

=== 32-bit (IA-32) ===
i386
first 32-bit x86 processor. Introduced paging on top of segmentation which is the most commonly used memory protection technology in modern operating systems ever since. Many additional powerful and valuable new instructions.
i486
Intel's second generation of 32-bit x86 processors, introduced built-in floating point unit (FPU), 8 KB on-chip L1 cache, and pipelining. Faster per MHz than the 386. Small number of new instructions.
P5
original Pentium microprocessors, first x86 processor with super-scalar architecture and branch prediction.
P6
used in Pentium Pro, Pentium II, Pentium II Xeon, Pentium III, and Pentium III Xeon microprocessors. First x86 processor to support SIMD instruction with XMM register implemented, RISC μop decode scheme, integrated register renaming and out-of-order execution. Some important new instructions, including conditional moves, which allow the avoidance of costly branch instructions. Added 36-bit physical memory addressing, "Physical Address Extension (PAE)".
- Pentium M: updated version of Pentium III's P6 microarchitecture designed from the ground up for mobile computing and first x86 to support micro-op fusion and smart cache.
- Enhanced Pentium M: updated, dual core version of the Pentium M microarchitecture used in the first Intel Core microprocessors, first x86 to have shadow register architecture and speed step technology.
NetBurst
commonly referred to as P7 although its internal name was P68 (P7 was used for Itanium). Used in Pentium 4, Pentium D, and some Xeon microprocessors. Very long pipeline. The Prescott was a major architectural revision. Later revisions were the first to feature Intel's x86-64 architecture, enhanced branch prediction and trace cache, and eventually support was added for the NX (No eXecute) bit to implement executable-space protection.

=== 64-bit (x86-64) ===
Core
reengineered P6-based microarchitecture used in Intel Core 2 and Xeon microprocessors, built on a 65 nm process, supporting x86-64 level SSE instruction and macro-op fusion and enhanced micro-op fusion with a wider front end and decoder, larger out-of-order core and renamed register, support loop stream detector and large shadow register file.
- Penryn: 45 nm shrink of the Core microarchitecture with larger cache, higher FSB and clock speeds, SSE4.1 instructions, support for XOP and F/SAVE and F/STORE instructions, enhanced register alias table and larger integer register file.
Nehalem
released November 17, 2008, built on a 45 nm process and used in the Core i7, Core i5, Core i3 microprocessors. Incorporates the memory controller into the CPU die. Added important powerful new instructions, SSE4.2.
- Westmere: 32 nm shrink of the Nehalem microarchitecture with several new features.

Sandy Bridge
32 nm microarchitecture, released January 9, 2011. Formerly called Gesher but renamed in 2007. First x86 to introduce 256 bit AVX instruction set and implementation of YMM registers.
- Ivy Bridge: successor to Sandy Bridge, using 22 nm process, released in April 2012.

Haswell
22 nm microarchitecture, released June 3, 2013. Added a number of new instructions, including AVX2 and FMA.
- Broadwell: 14 nm derivative of the Haswell microarchitecture, released in September 2014. Three-cycle FMUL latency, 64 entry scheduler. Formerly called Rockwell.

Skylake
14 nm microarchitecture, released August 5, 2015.
- Kaby Lake: successor to Skylake, released in August 2016, broke Intel's tick-tock schedule due to delays with the 10 nm process.
  - Amber Lake: ultra low power, mobile-only successor to Kaby Lake, using 14+ nm process, released in August 2018 (no architecture changes)
  - Whiskey Lake: mobile-only successor to Kaby Lake Refresh, using 14++ nm process, released in August 2018 (has hardware mitigations for some vulnerabilities)
- Skylake-X: high-end desktop, workstation and server microarchitecture, released on June 19, 2017 (HEDT), July 11, 2017 (SP) and August 29, 2017 (W). Introduces support for AVX-512 instruction set.
- Coffee Lake: successor to Kaby Lake, using 14++ nm process, released in October 2017
- Cascade Lake: server and high-end desktop successor to Kaby Lake-X and Skylake-X, using 14++ nm process, released in April 2019
- Comet Lake: successor to Coffee Lake, using 14++ nm process, released in August 2019
- Cooper Lake: server-only, optimized for AI oriented workloads using bfloat16, with limited availability only to Intel priority partners, using 14++ nm process, released in 2020

Palm Cove
Originally meant to be successor to Skylake, but cancelled after releasing just one chip. Includes the AVX-512 instruction set.
- Cannon Lake: mobile-only successor of Kaby Lake, using Intel's 10 nm process, first and only microarchitecture to implement the Palm Cove core, released in May 2018. Formerly called Skymont, discontinued in December 2019.
Starting with Cannon Lake, Intel has changed their microarchitecture naming scheme, decoupling core codenames from CPU codenames.

Sunny Cove
Successor to the Palm Cove core, first non-Atom core to include hardware acceleration for SHA hashing algorithms.
- Ice Lake: low power, mobile-only successor to Whiskey Lake, using 10 nm process, released in September 2019
- Lakefield: mobile-only, Intel's first hybrid processor, released in June 2020. Sunny Cove is used in the singular performance core (P-core) of Lakefield processors. AVX and more advanced instruction sets are disabled due to the E-core not supporting them.
- Ice Lake-SP: server-only successor to Cascade Lake, using 10 nm process, released in April 2021

Cypress Cove
Backport of Sunny Cove to Intel's 14 nm process
- Rocket Lake: Successor to Comet Lake, using Intel's 14++ nm process, released on March 30, 2021

Willow Cove
Successor to the Sunny Cove core, includes new security features and redesigns the cache subsystem.
- Tiger Lake: successor to Ice Lake, using Intel's 10 nm SuperFin (10SF) process, released in Q4 2020

Golden Cove
Successor to the Willow Cove core, includes improvements to performance and power efficiency. Also includes new instructions.
- Alder Lake: hybrid processor, succeeds Rocket Lake and Tiger Lake; uses Intel 7 process (previously known as 10ESF), released on November 4, 2021. Golden Cove is used in P-cores of Alder Lake processors.
- Sapphire Rapids: server and workstation-only, successor to Ice Lake-SP, manufactured on Intel 7 process, released on January 10, 2023. Introduces AMX.

Raptor Cove
A refresh of Golden Cove with increased L2 and L3 caches and core clocks.
- Raptor Lake: successor to Alder Lake with increased cache sizes, core clocks and the number of E-cores, released on October 20, 2022. Manufactured using Intel 7 process. Raptor Cove is used in the P-cores while the E-cores are still implemented using Gracemont microarchitecture.
- Emerald Rapids: successor to Sapphire Rapids, server- and workstation-only. Fifth-generation Xeon Scalable server processors based on the Intel 7 node.

=== x86 ULV (Atom) ===
Bonnell
45 nm, low-power, in-order microarchitecture for use in Atom processors.
- Saltwell: 32 nm shrink of the Bonnell microarchitecture.

Silvermont
22 nm, out-of-order microarchitecture for use in Atom processors, released on May 6, 2013.
- Airmont: 14 nm shrink of the Silvermont microarchitecture.

Goldmont
14 nm Atom microarchitecture iteration after Silvermont but borrows heavily from Skylake processors (e.g., GPU), released in April 2016.
- Goldmont Plus: successor to Goldmont microarchitecture, still based on the 14 nm process, released on December 11, 2017.

Tremont
10 nm Atom microarchitecture iteration after Goldmont Plus.
- Lakefield: mobile-only, Intel's first hybrid processor, released in June 2020. Tremont is used in efficiency cores (E-cores) of Lakefield processors.
- Jasper Lake: Celeron and Pentium Silver desktop and mobile processors, released in Q1 2021.
- Elkhart Lake: embedded processors targeted at IoT, released in Q1 2021.

Gracemont
Intel 7 process Atom microarchitecture iteration after Tremont. First Atom class core with AVX and AVX2 support.
- Alder Lake: hybrid processor, succeeds Rocket Lake and Tiger Lake, released on November 4, 2021. Gracemont is used in E-cores of Alder Lake processors.
- Raptor Lake: a refresh of Alder Lake, released on October 20, 2022.

=== x86 MIC (Many Integrated Core) ===
Larrabee (cancelled 2010)
multi-core in-order x86-64 updated version of P5 microarchitecture, with wide SIMD vector units and texture sampling hardware for use in graphics.

Xeon Phi

== Other microarchitectures ==
=== IA-64 (Itanium) ===
Merced
original Itanium microarchitecture. Used only in the first Itanium microprocessors.
McKinley
enhanced microarchitecture used in the first two generations of the Itanium 2 microprocessor. Madison is the 130 nm version.
Montecito
enhanced McKinley microarchitecture used in the Itanium 2 9000- and 9100-series of processors. Added dual core, coarse multithreading, and other improvements. The Montvale update added demand-based switching (SpeedStep) and core-level lockstep execution.
Tukwila
enhanced microarchitecture used in the Itanium 9300 series of processors. Added quad core, an integrated memory controller, QuickPath Interconnect, and other improvements e.g. a more active SoEMT.
Poulson
Itanium processor featuring an all-new microarchitecture. 8 cores, decoupling in pipeline and in multithreading. 12-wide issue with partial out-of-order execution.
Kittson
the last Itanium. It has the same microarchitecture as Poulson, but slightly higher clock speed for the top two models.

=== Miscellaneous ===
4004/4040

8008

8080/8085

iAPX 432

80960

80860 (Note: Completely unrelated to 80960.)

XScale
a microarchitecture implementing the ARM architecture instruction set.

== Roadmap ==
=== Pentium 4 / Core / P-Core lines ===
Pentium 4 / Core roadmap
Fab process	Microarch	Code name	Core gen	Xeon Scalable gen	Release date	Processors				
Fab process	Microarch	Code name	Core gen	Xeon Scalable gen	Release date	Mobile	Desktop	Enthusiast / Workstation	1P/2P Server	4P/8P Server
180 nm	P6, NetBurst	Willamette	—		2000-11-20	—	Willamette	—	Foster	Foster MP
130 nm	P6, NetBurst	Northwood/ Mobile Pentium 4 Banias	—		2002-01-07	Northwood Mobile; Banias	Northwood	Northwood-XE	Prestonia; Gallatin	Gallatin
90 nm	P6, NetBurst	Prescott; Dothan	—		2004-02-01	Dothan	Prescott; Smithfield	Prescott 2M-XE; Smithfield-XE	Nocona; Irwindale; Paxville	Potomac; Cranford; Paxville
65 nm	P6, NetBurst	Cedar Mill; Yonah; Presler	1 (Yonah only)	—	2006-01-05	Yonah	Cedar Mill; Presler	Presler-XE	Dempsey; Sossaman	Tulsa
65 nm	Core	Merom	2	—	2006-07-27	Merom	Conroe	Kentsfield	Woodcrest; Clovertown	Tigerton
45 nm	Core	Penryn	2	—	2007-11-11	Penryn	Wolfdale	Yorkfield	Harpertown	Dunnington
45 nm	Nehalem	Nehalem	1 (Core i)	—	2008-11-17	Clarksfield	Lynnfield	Bloomfield	Gainestown	Beckton
32 nm	Nehalem	Westmere	1 (Core i)	—	2010-01-04	Arrandale	Clarkdale	Gulftown	Westmere-EP	Westmere-EX
32 nm	Sandy; Bridge	Sandy; Bridge	2	—	2011-01-09	Sandy Bridge-M	Sandy Bridge	Sandy Bridge-E	Sandy Bridge-EP	—
22 nm	Sandy; Bridge	Ivy; Bridge	3	—	2012-04-29	Ivy Bridge-M	Ivy Bridge	Ivy Bridge-E	Ivy Bridge-EP	Ivy Bridge-EX
22 nm	Haswell	Haswell	4	—	2013-06-02	Haswell-H; Haswell-MB; Haswell-ULP/ULX	Haswell-DT	Haswell-E	Haswell-EP	Haswell-EX
22 nm	Haswell	Devil's; Canyon	4	—	2014-06	—	Haswell-DT	—		
14 nm	Haswell	Broadwell	5	—	2014-09-05	Broadwell-H; Broadwell-U; Broadwell-Y	Broadwell-DT	Broadwell-E	Broadwell-EP	Broadwell-EX
14 nm	Skylake (Note: Cascade Lake and Cooper Lake microprocessors have additional instructions that enable Intel Deep Learning Boost.)	Skylake	6	1	2015-08-05	Skylake-H; Skylake-U; Skylake-Y	Skylake-S	Skylake-W; Skylake-X	Skylake-SP (formerly Skylake-EP/-EX)	
14 nm	Skylake	Kaby; Lake	7 / 8	—	2016-10	Kaby Lake-G; Kaby Lake-H; Kaby Lake-U; Kaby Lake-Y	Kaby Lake-S	Kaby Lake-X	—	
14 nm	Skylake	Coffee; Lake	8 / 9	—	2017-10	Coffee Lake-B; Coffee Lake-H; Coffee Lake-U	Coffee Lake-S	Coffee Lake-W	Coffee Lake (Xeon E)	—
14 nm	Skylake	Whiskey; Lake	8	—	2018-08-28	Whiskey Lake-U	—			
14 nm	Skylake	Amber; Lake	8 / 10	—	2018-08-28	Amber Lake-Y	—			
14 nm	Skylake	Cascade; Lake	—	2	2019-04-02	—		Cascade Lake-W; Cascade Lake-X	Cascade Lake-AP; Cascade Lake-SP	Cascade Lake-SP
14 nm	Skylake	Comet; Lake	10	—	2019-09 (Note: Retail availability.)	Comet Lake-H; Comet Lake-U; Comet Lake-Y	Comet Lake-S	Comet Lake-W	—	
14 nm	Skylake	Cooper; Lake	—	3	2020-06	—				Cooper Lake-SP
14 nm	Cypress; Cove	Rocket; Lake	11	—	2021-03	—	Rocket Lake-S	Rocket; Lake-W	Rocket Lake (Xeon E)	—
10 nm	Palm; Cove	Cannon; Lake	8	—	2018-05	Cannon Lake-U	—			
10 nm	Sunny; Cove	Ice; Lake	10	3	2019-09 (mobile); 2021-04 (server)	Ice Lake-U; Ice Lake-Y	—	Ice Lake-W	Ice Lake-SP	—
10 nm	Sunny; Cove	Lakefield (hybrid)	—	—	2020-06-10	Lakefield	—			
10 nm	Willow; Cove	Tiger; Lake	11	—	2020-09	Tiger Lake-H; Tiger Lake-H35; Tiger Lake-UP3; Tiger Lake-UP4	—			
Intel 7 (Note: Previously known as 10nm Enhanced Super Fin or 10ESF.)	Golden; Cove	Alder; Lake (hybrid)	12	—	2021-11-04	Alder Lake-H; Alder Lake-HX; Alder Lake-P; Alder Lake-U	Alder Lake-S	—		
Intel 7	Golden; Cove	Sapphire; Rapids	—	4	2023-01-10	—		Sapphire Rapids-WS	Sapphire Rapids-SP; Sapphire Rapids-HBM	Sapphire Rapids-SP
Intel 7	Raptor; Cove	Raptor; Lake (hybrid)	13 / 14 / Series; 1 / 2	—	2022-10-20	Raptor Lake-H; Raptor Lake-HX; Raptor Lake-P; Raptor Lake-PX; Raptor Lake-U	Raptor Lake-S	—	Raptor Lake (Xeon E)	—
Intel 7	Raptor; Cove	Emerald; Rapids	—	5	2023-12-14	—			Emerald Rapids-SP	—
Intel 4	Redwood; Cove	Meteor; Lake (hybrid)	Ultra Series 1	—	2023-12-14	Meteor Lake-H; Meteor Lake-U	—			
Intel 3	Redwood; Cove	Granite; Rapids	—	6	2024-09-24; 2026-02-02 (workstation)	—		Granite Rapids-WS	Granite Rapids-AP; Granite Rapids-SP	Granite Rapids-SP
TSMC N3B	Lion; Cove	Lunar; Lake (hybrid)	Ultra; Series 2	—	2024-09	Lunar Lake-V	—			
TSMC N3B	Lion; Cove	Arrow; Lake (hybrid)	Ultra; Series 2	—	2024-10-24 (desktop); 2025-01-06 (mobile)	Arrow Lake-H; Arrow Lake-HX	Arrow Lake-S	—		
Intel 3	Redwood; Cove	Arrow; Lake (hybrid)	Ultra; Series 2	—	2024-10-24 (desktop); 2025-01-06 (mobile)	Arrow Lake-U (Meteor Lake refresh)	—			
Intel 18A	Cougar; Cove	Panther; Lake (hybrid)	Ultra; Series 3	—	2026-01-05	Panther Lake-H; Panther Lake	—			
Intel 18A	Cougar; Cove	Wildcat Lake (hybrid)	Series 3	—	2026-04	Wildcat Lake	—			
Intel 18A	Panther; Cove X	Diamond Rapids	—	TBA	2026	—			Diamond Rapids-AP	
TBA (TSMC; 2 nm or Intel 18A)	Coyote; Cove	Nova; Lake (hybrid)	Ultra; Series 4	—	2026	Nova Lake-H; Nova Lake-HX; Nova Lake-U	Nova Lake-S	TBA		—
TBA (TSMC; 2 nm or Intel 18A)	Griffin; Cove	Razor; Lake (hybrid)		—	2027	TBA	TBA	TBA		—
		Titan; Lake		—	2028	TBA	TBA	TBA		—
		Hammer; Lake		—	2029	TBA	TBA	TBA		—

=== Atom / E-Core lines ===
Atom roadmap
Fabrication process	Microarchitecture	Release date	Processors/SoCs							
Fabrication process	Microarchitecture	Release date	MID, smartphone	Tablet	Laptop	Desktop	Embedded	Server	Communication	CE
45 nm	Bonnell	2008	Silverthorne	—	Diamondville		Tunnel Creek, Stellarton	—		Sodaville
45 nm	Bonnell	2010	Lincroft		Pineview		Tunnel Creek, Stellarton	—		Groveland
32 nm	Saltwell	2011	Medfield (Penwell & Lexington), Clover Trail+ (Cloverview)	Clover Trail (Cloverview)	Cedar Trail (Cedarview)			Centerton & Briarwood		Berryville
22 nm	Silvermont	2013	Merrifield (Tangier), Slayton, Moorefield (Anniedale)	Bay Trail-T (Valleyview)	Bay Trail-M (Valleyview)	Bay Trail-D (Valleyview)	Bay Trail-I (Valleyview)	Avoton	Rangeley	
14 nm	Airmont	2014	Binghamton & Riverton	Cherry Trail-T (Cherryview)	Braswell			Denverton Cancelled		
14 nm	Goldmont	2016	Broxton Cancelled	Willow Trail Cancelled; Apollo Lake	Apollo Lake			Denverton		
14 nm	Goldmont; Plus	2017			Gemini Lake; Gemini Lake Refresh					
10 nm	Tremont	2020		Lakefield (hybrid)	Lakefield (hybrid); Elkhart Lake; Jasper Lake			Jacobsville; Parker Ridge; Snow Ridge		
Intel 7	Gracemont	2021			Alder Lake (hybrid); Raptor Lake (hybrid); Alder Lake-N; Twin Lake					
Intel 4	Crestmont	2023						Grand Ridge		
Intel 4 + TSMC N6	Crestmont	2023			Meteor Lake (hybrid)					
Intel 3	Crestmont	2024						Sierra Forest		
TSMC N3B	Skymont	2024			Lunar Lake (hybrid)					
TSMC N3B	Skymont	2024			Arrow Lake (hybrid)					
Intel 18A	Darkmont	2026			Panther Lake (hybrid)			Clearwater Forest		
	Arctic Wolf	2026			Nova Lake (hybrid)					

== See also ==
- List of Intel processors - Consumer Computer or non-consumer workstation
- List of AMD CPU microarchitectures
- Marvell Technology Group XScale microarchitecture
- Transient execution CPU vulnerability

== Notes ==
Atom (ULV)		Node name	Pentium/Core						
Microarch.	Step	Node name	Microarch.	Step					
		600 nm	P6	Pentium Pro (133 MHz)					
		500 nm	P6	Pentium Pro (150 MHz)					
		350 nm	P6	Pentium Pro (166–200 MHz)					
		350 nm	P6	Klamath					
		250 nm	P6	Deschutes					
		250 nm	P6	Katmai	NetBurst				
		180 nm	P6	Coppermine	Willamette				
		130 nm	P6	Tualatin	Northwood				
		130 nm	Pentium M (P6)	Banias	Northwood		NetBurst(HT)		NetBurst(×2)
		90 nm	Pentium M (P6)	Dothan	Prescott	⇨	Prescott‑2M	⇨	Smithfield
		90 nm	Pentium M (P6)	Dothan	~~Tejas~~	→	⇩	→	~~Cedarmill (Tejas)~~
		65 nm	Pentium M (P6)	Yonah	~~Nehalem (NetBurst)~~		Cedar Mill	⇨	Presler
		65 nm	Core	Merom	4 cores on mainstream desktop, DDR3 introduced				
Bonnell	Bonnell	45 nm	Core	Penryn					
Bonnell	Bonnell	45 nm	Nehalem	Nehalem	HT reintroduced, integrated MC, PCH; L3-cache introduced, 256 KB L2-cache/core				
Bonnell	Saltwell	32 nm	Nehalem	Westmere	Introduced GPU on same package and AES-NI				
Bonnell	Saltwell	32 nm	Sandy Bridge	Sandy Bridge	On-die ring bus, no more non-UEFI motherboards				
Silvermont	Silvermont	22 nm	Sandy Bridge	Ivy Bridge					
Silvermont	Silvermont	22 nm	Haswell	Haswell	Fully integrated voltage regulator				
Silvermont	Airmont	14 nm	Haswell	Broadwell					
Silvermont	Airmont	14 nm	Skylake	Skylake	DDR4 introduced on mainstream desktop				
Goldmont		14 nm	Skylake	Kaby Lake					
Goldmont		14 nm	Skylake	Coffee Lake	6 cores on mainstream desktop				
Goldmont		14 nm	Skylake	Amber Lake	Mobile-only				
Goldmont Plus		14 nm	Skylake	Whiskey Lake	Mobile-only				
Goldmont Plus		14 nm	Skylake	Coffee Lake Refresh	8 cores on mainstream desktop				
Goldmont Plus		14 nm	Skylake	Comet Lake	10 cores on mainstream desktop				
Goldmont Plus		14 nm	Sunny Cove	Cypress Cove (Rocket Lake)	Backported Sunny Cove microarchitecture for 14 nm				
Tremont		10 nm	Skylake	Palm Cove (Cannon Lake)	Mobile-only				
Tremont		10 nm	Sunny Cove	Sunny Cove (Ice Lake)	512 KB L2-cache/core				
Tremont		10 nm	Sunny Cove	Willow Cove (Tiger Lake)	X^{e} graphics engine				
Gracemont		Intel 7 (10 nm ESF)	Golden Cove	Golden Cove (Alder Lake)	Hybrid, DDR5, PCIe 5.0				
Gracemont		Intel 7 (10 nm ESF)	Golden Cove	Raptor Cove (Raptor Lake)					
Crestmont		Intel 4	Redwood Cove	Meteor Lake	Mobile-only; NPU, chiplet architecture				
Crestmont		Intel 3	Redwood Cove	Arrow Lake-U					
Skymont		TSMC N3B	Lion Cove	Lunar Lake	Low power mobile only (9–30 W)				
Skymont		TSMC N3B	Lion Cove	Arrow Lake					
Darkmont		Intel 18A	Cougar Cove	Panther Lake					
Arctic Wolf		Intel 18A and/or TSMC N2P	Coyote Cove	Nova Lake					
