= Alder Lake =

Intel microprocessor family

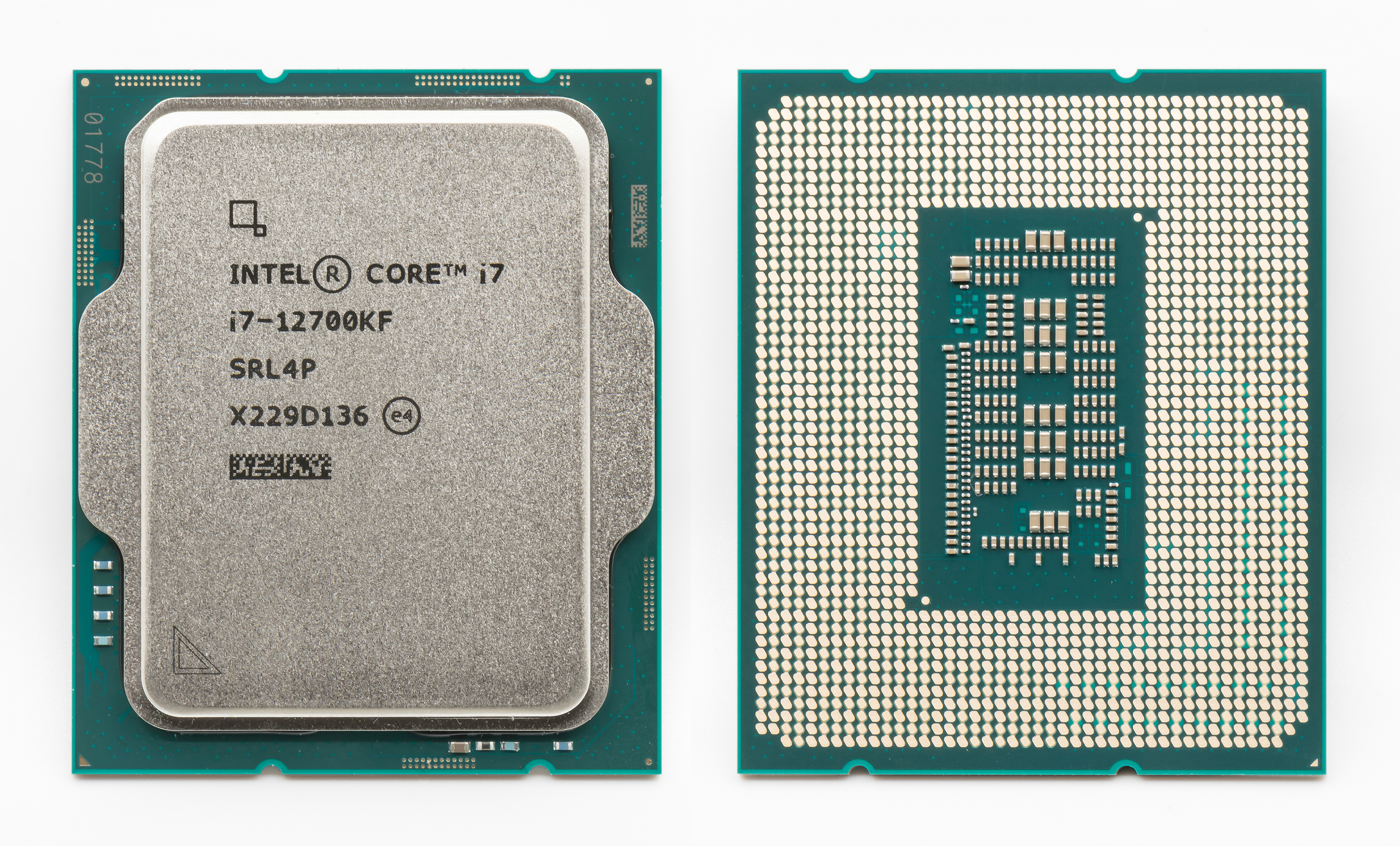
- Intel Core i7-12700KF

General information
- Launched: November 4, 2021; 5 years ago
- Discontinued: April 25, 2025; 18 months ago (mobile)
- Marketed by: Intel
- Designed by: Intel
- Common manufacturer: Intel
- Product code: 80715

Performance
- Max. CPU clock rate: 800 MHz to 5.3 GHz, P-cores; 700 MHz to 4.0 GHz, E-cores
- DMI speeds: 16 GT/s

Physical specifications
- Cores: Up to 8 P-cores; Up to 8 E-cores
- GPU: Intel Xe-based integrated graphics
- Sockets: Desktop; LGA 1700; Mobile; BGA 1744; BGA 1964 (HX series)

Cache
- L1 cache: 80 KB (32 instructions + 48 data), per P-core; 96 KB (64 instructions + 32 data), per E-core
- L2 cache: 1.25 MB per P-core; 2 MB per E-core cluster
- L3 cache: Up to 30 MB, shared

Architecture and classification
- Technology node: Intel 7 (previously known as 10ESF)
- Microarchitecture: Golden Cove (P-cores); Gracemont (E-cores)
- Instruction set: x86
- Instructions: x86-64
- Extensions: AES-NI, CLMUL, RDRAND, SHA, TXT, MMX, SSE, SSE2, SSE3, SSSE3, SSE4.1, SSE4.2, AVX, AVX2, FMA3, AVX-VNNI, VT-x, VT-d

Products, models, variants
- Product code name: ADL
- Brand names: Intel Core; Pentium; Celeron; Intel Processor
- Variant: Sapphire Rapids (server/workstation)

History
- Predecessors: Tiger Lake, 10 nm, mobile; Rocket Lake, 14 nm, desktop; Lakefield, 10 nm, hybrid mobile
- Successor: Raptor Lake

Support status
- Legacy support for iGPU

Alder Lake is Intel's codename for the 12th generation of Intel Core processors based on a hybrid architecture utilizing Golden Cove performance cores and Gracemont efficient cores. It was launched on November 4, 2021. It is fabricated using Intel's Intel 7 process, previously referred to as Intel 10 nm Enhanced SuperFin (10ESF). The 10ESF has a 10–15% boost in performance over the 10SF used in the mobile Tiger Lake processors. Intel officially announced 12th Gen Intel Core CPUs on October 27, 2021, mobile CPUs and non-K series desktop CPUs on January 4, 2022, Alder Lake-P and -U series on February 23, 2022, and Alder Lake-HX series on May 10, 2022.

== History ==
It was announced in November 2021 that Intel Alder Lake would use a hybrid architecture combining performance and efficiency cores, similar to ARM big.LITTLE. This was Intel's second hybrid architecture, after the mobile-only Lakefield released in June 2020. While the desktop Alder Lake processors were already on the market by January 2022, the mobile processors were not, although release was expected early that year. Starting cost were US$289 for the Core i5-12600K. Gracemont was the name given to the efficiency cores, while Golden Cove cores were set for tasks such as gaming and video processing. First laptop tests were performed later that month, with PCMag positively reviewing the Core i9-12900HK, stating the H series represented "Intel's enthusiast line", with "the same hybrid designs" also in the P-series and U-series chips to come out later that year.

In April 2022, press reported on "hints" that Intel was working on Alder Lake-X. Intel officially announced the HX processor series on May 10, 2022, including Core i5, Core i7 and Core i9 models, when Intel announced "seven new mobile processors for the 12th Gen Intel Core mobile family at its Intel Vision event. With the lineup based on Intel's desktop Alder Lake chips, it was named the Alder Lake-HX series, or 12th-gen Core HX, with the Core i9-12950HX as the flagship and Intel's first 16-core chip designed for laptops.

== Features ==
=== CPU ===
Alder Lake processor die from an i5-12400F with 6 P-cores

An Alder Lake P core

- Golden Cove performance cores ("P-cores")
  - Dedicated floating-point adders
  - New 6-wide instruction decoder (from 4-wide in Rocket Lake/Tiger Lake) with the ability to fetch up to 32 bytes of instructions per cycle (from 16)
  - 12 execution ports (from 10), 5 integer ALU ports
  - 512 reorder-buffer entries (from 352)
  - 6-wide μOP allocations (from 5)
  - TAGE-like directional branch predictor (with a global history size of 194 taken branches)
  - μOP cache size increased to 4K entries (up from 2.25K)
  - Support for zero-latency integer addition with small immediate constants in the register renamer
  - AVX-VNNI, a VEX-coded variant of AVX512-VNNI for 256-bit vectors
  - AVX-512 (including FP16) is present but disabled by default to match E-cores. On early revisions of microprocessors it still can be enabled on some motherboards with some BIOS versions by disabling the E-cores. Intel has physically fused off AVX-512 on later revisions of Alder Lake CPUs manufactured in early 2022 and onward.
  - ~18% IPC uplift.
- Gracemont efficient cores ("E-cores")
  - Aggregated into 4-core clusters with a shared 2MB L2 cache
  - 256 reorder-buffer entries (up from 208 in Tremont)
  - 17 execution ports (up from 12)
  - AVX2, FMA and AVX-VNNI
  - Skylake-like IPC.
- New instruction set extensions:
  - PTWRITE
  - SERIALIZE
  - HRESET
  - User-mode wait (WAITPKG): TPAUSE, UMONITOR, UMWAIT
- Up to 1 TB/s interconnect between cores
- Intel Thread Director (only for CPUs with P and E-cores), which is a marketing name for Enhanced Hardware Feedback Interface (EHFI). This is a hardware technology to assist the OS thread scheduler with more efficient load distribution between heterogeneous CPU cores. Enabling this new capability requires support in the operating system.
- Architectural last branch records (LBRs)
- Hypervisor-managed linear address translation (HLAT)
- Control-flow enforcement technology (CET), including support for indirect branch tracking (IBT) and shadow stack (SS)
- 4–30 MB L3 cache
- Cores:
  - Up to 8 P-cores and 8 E-cores on desktop
  - Up to 6 P-cores and 8 E-cores on mobile (UP3 designs)
  - Up to 2 P-cores and 8 E-cores on ultra mobile (UP4 designs)
  - Only P-cores feature hyper-threading

=== GPU ===
- Intel Xe-LP (Gen 12.2) GPU
- Up to 96 EU on mobile and 32 EU on desktop
- Up to 4 displays
- Supports hardware decoding for AV1
- Alder Lake supports and enables by default GuG and HuC on Linux Xe drivers.

=== RAM ===
- DDR5, DDR4, LPDDR5, and LPDDR4X memory support
  - Up to DDR5-4800
  - Up to DDR4-3200
  - Up to LPDDR5-5200
  - Up to LPDDR4x-4267
  - XMP 3.0
  - Dynamic Memory Boost
  - Support up to 256 GB (from 128 GB)

=== I/O ===
- LGA 1700 socket for desktop processors.
- BGA1744 Type3 and Type4 HDI for mobile processors
- 20 PCIe lanes from CPU
  - 16 PCIe 5.0 lanes
  - 4 PCIe 4.0 lanes
- Chipset link DMI 4.0 ×8 link with Intel 600 series PCH chipsets (from DMI 3.0 x8)
- Integrated Thunderbolt 4 and WiFi 6E support
  - Supported via PCH on desktop processors
  - Directly supported by CPU on non-HX mobile processors
  - No support on HX mobile processors, could be added via external controller

== Dies ==
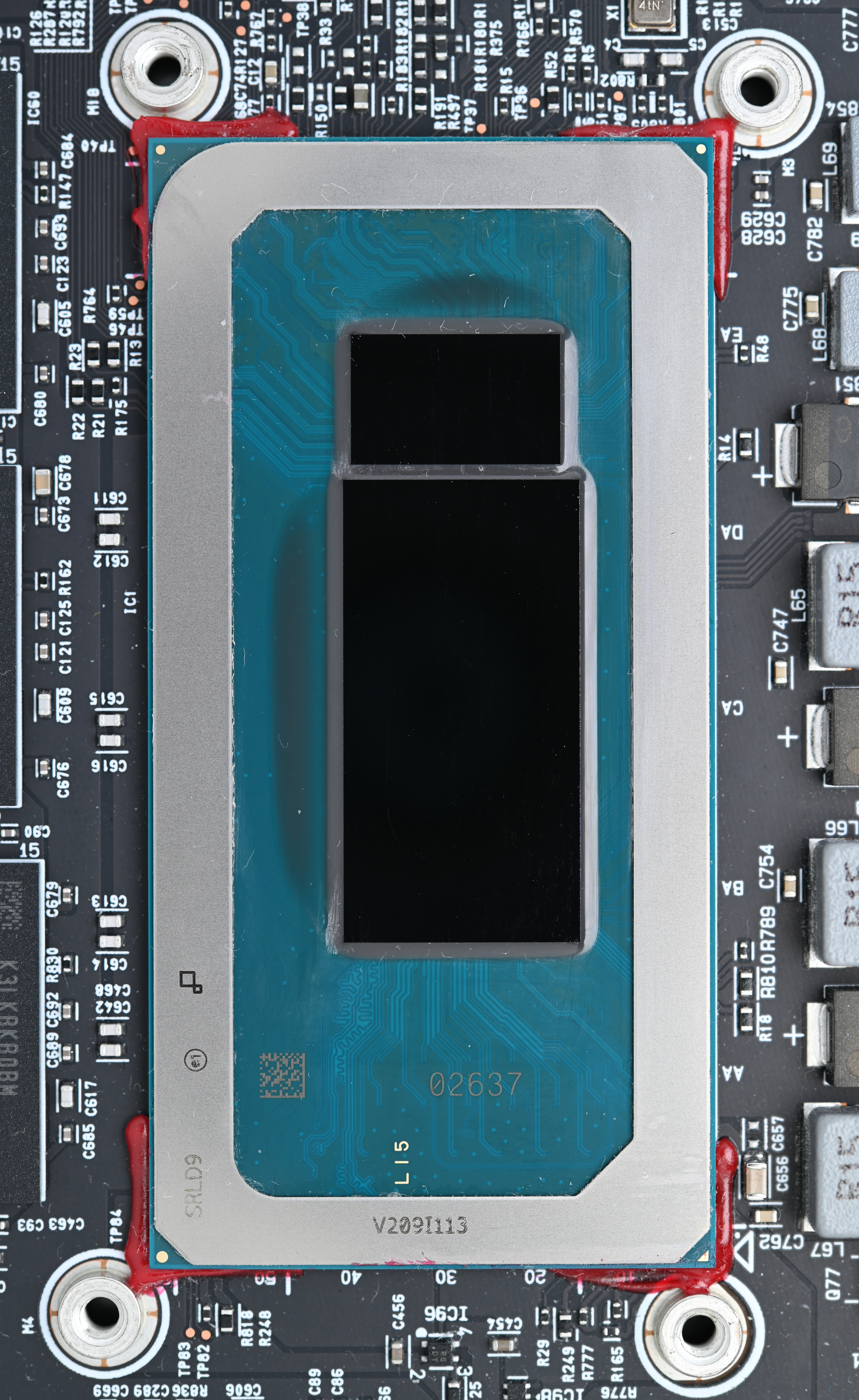
Core i5-1240P mobile processor with 4P + 8E cores based on Alder Lake-P

For the Alder Lake generation, Intel produced 4 different dies. Each die has a different number of P-cores (P) and E-cores (E) and GPU Execution Units.

Segment	CPU configuration	GPU	Width	Length	Die size
Alder Lake-S (desktop high end) Alder Lake-HX (mobile high end)	8P + 8E	32 EU	10.5 mm	20.5 mm	215.25 mm^{2}
Alder Lake-S (desktop mainstream)	6P + 0E	32 EU	10.19 mm	15.47 mm	157.74 mm^{2}
Alder Lake-H Alder Lake-P (mobile mainstream)	6P + 8E	96 EU	10.62 mm	20.45 mm	217.18 mm^{2}
Alder Lake-U (ultra mobile)	2P + 8E	96 EU	19 mm	28.5 mm	541.50 mm^{2}

== Software support ==
Alder Lake requires special support from the operating system due to its relatively unusual-for-x86 hybrid nature. For software unable to be upgraded, a UEFI-provided compatibility mode may be used to disable the E-cores; it is enabled by the user turning on scroll lock.

=== CPUID incoherence ===
The P-cores and E-cores on early versions of Alder Lake CPUs reported different CPUID models. This has caused issues with digital rights management systems that perceive the P-cores and E-cores as being separate computers, and falsely enforce license restrictions preventing a particular piece of software from being executed on more than one device at a time. Intel published a list of PC games it identified as having this compatibility issue, and stated that it was working with publishers to develop patches. Some of the games were identified by Intel as only having this bug on Windows 10, and functioning correctly on Windows 11 (with some of them dependent on Windows 11 patches scheduled to be released in November 2021). ExamSoft similarly stated that its monitoring software for educational assessments (such as the bar examination) was similarly incompatible with Alder Lake CPUs due to checks detecting virtual machines.

This problem has been fixed in a microcode update. The P and E cores now return the same CPUID when both are enabled. A different CPUID is reported when E-cores are disabled and only P-cores are enabled. The AVX-512 instruction set extension is implemented in the P-cores but disabled due to incompatibility with the E-cores. Hackers have shown that it is possible to enable the AVX-512 instructions on the P-cores when the E-cores are disabled and an old microcode version is used.

There are minor differences between the behavior of the two types of cores with regard to an undefined overflow flag in certain bitwise operations.

=== Scheduler support ===
Alder Lake's CPU topology has performance implications, especially for gaming environments, where developers are not used to NUMA setups. Microsoft added support for Intel Thread Director (ITD) in Windows 11. A wide variety of inputs, including whether a process' window is in the foreground, feeds into the ITD. The ITD can function to a lesser extent with the OS providing less or no cooperation. Support in Linux is merged in kernel 5.18, but this alone is not sufficient until the kernel gets hints from userspace in order to schedule tasks to run on certain types of cores. Windows 10 version 21H2 and later Windows 10 has support for Intel Thread Director, but such support is limited.

=== Blu-Ray DRM support ===
The CPU family no longer features Intel SGX which is a requirement for playing UltraHD Blu-ray discs.

== List of 12th generation Alder Lake processors ==
=== Desktop processors (Alder Lake-S) ===
- All the CPUs support up to 128 GB of DDR4-3200 or DDR5-4800 RAM in dual channel mode and up to 256 GB of DDR5 after a BIOS upgrade.
- All the CPUs support 16x PCI Express Gen 5 and 4x PCI Express Gen 4 lanes, but support may vary depending on motherboard and chipsets.
- Models **without** the F suffix feature any one of the following integrated UHD Graphics GPUs, all with base frequency of 300 MHz:
  - UHD Graphics 770 with 32 EUs,
  - UHD Graphics 730 with 24 EUs,
  - UHD Graphics 710 with 16 EUs.
- By default, Alder Lake CPUs are configured to run at Turbo Power at all times and Base Power is only guaranteed when P-Cores/E-cores do not exceed the base clock rate.
- Max Turbo Power: the maximum sustained (> 1 s) power dissipation of the processor as limited by current and/or temperature controls. Instantaneous power may exceed Maximum Turbo Power for short durations (≤ 10 ms). Maximum Turbo Power is configurable by system vendor and can be system specific.
- CPUs in **bold** below feature UDIMM ECC memory support only when paired with a motherboard based on the W680 chipset.
- By default, Core i9-12900KS achieves 5.5 GHz only when using Thermal Velocity Boost.

Processor branding	Model	Cores (threads)		Clock rate (GHz)						GPU		Smart cache	TDP		Price (USD)
Processor branding	Model	Cores (threads)		Base		Turbo Boost				Model	Max. freq. (GHz)	Smart cache	TDP		Price (USD)
Processor branding	Model	Cores (threads)		Base		2.0		3.0	TVB	Model	Max. freq. (GHz)	Smart cache	TDP		Price (USD)
Processor branding	Model	P	E	P	E	P	E	P	P	Model	Max. freq. (GHz)	Smart cache	Base	Turbo	Price (USD)
Core i9	**12900KS**	8 (16)	8 (8)	3.4	2.5	5.2	4.0	5.3	5.5	UHD 770	1.55	30 MB	150 W	241 W	$739
Core i9	**12900K**	8 (16)	8 (8)	3.2	2.4	5.1	3.9	5.2	—N/a	UHD 770	1.55	30 MB	125 W	241 W	$589
Core i9	12900KF	8 (16)	8 (8)	3.2	2.4	5.1	3.9	5.2	—N/a	—N/a		30 MB	125 W	241 W	$564
Core i9	**12900**	8 (16)	8 (8)	2.4	1.8	5.0	3.8	5.1	—N/a	UHD 770	1.55	30 MB	65 W	202 W	$489
Core i9	12900F	8 (16)	8 (8)	2.4	1.8	5.0	3.8	5.1	—N/a	—N/a		30 MB	65 W	202 W	$464
Core i9	**12900T**	8 (16)	8 (8)	1.4	1.0	4.8	3.6	4.9	—N/a	UHD 770	1.55	30 MB	35 W	106 W	$489
Core i7	**12700K**	8 (16)	4 (4)	3.6	2.7	4.9	3.8	5.0	—N/a	UHD 770	1.50	25 MB	125 W	190 W	$409
Core i7	12700KF	8 (16)	4 (4)	3.6	2.7	4.9	3.8	5.0	—N/a	—N/a		25 MB	125 W	190 W	$384
Core i7	**12700**	8 (16)	4 (4)	2.1	1.6	4.8	3.6	4.9	—N/a	UHD 770	1.50	25 MB	65 W	180 W	$339
Core i7	12700F	8 (16)	4 (4)	2.1	1.6	4.8	3.6	4.9	—N/a	—N/a		25 MB	65 W	180 W	$314
Core i7	**12700T**	8 (16)	4 (4)	1.4	1.0	4.6	3.4	4.7	—N/a	UHD 770	1.50	25 MB	35 W	99 W	$339
Core i5	**12600K**	6 (12)	4 (4)	3.7	2.8	4.9	3.6	—N/a	—N/a	UHD 770	1.45	20 MB	125 W	150 W	$289
Core i5	12600KF	6 (12)	4 (4)	3.7	2.8	4.9	3.6	—N/a	—N/a	—N/a		20 MB	125 W	150 W	$264
Core i5	**12600**	6 (12)	—N/a	3.3	—N/a	4.8	—N/a	—N/a	—N/a	UHD 770	1.45	18 MB	65 W	117 W	$223
Core i5	**12600T**	6 (12)	—N/a	2.1	—N/a	4.6	—N/a	—N/a	—N/a	UHD 770	1.45	18 MB	35 W	74 W	$223
Core i5	**12500**	6 (12)	—N/a	3.0	—N/a	4.6	—N/a	—N/a	—N/a	UHD 770	1.45	18 MB	65 W	117 W	$202
Core i5	**12500T**	6 (12)	—N/a	2.0	—N/a	4.4	—N/a	—N/a	—N/a	UHD 770	1.45	18 MB	35 W	74 W	$202
Core i5	12490F	6 (12)	—N/a	3.0	—N/a	4.6	—N/a	—N/a	—N/a	—N/a		20 MB	65 W	117 W	China exclusive
Core i5	12400	6 (12)	—N/a	2.5	—N/a	4.4	—N/a	—N/a	—N/a	UHD 730	1.45	18 MB	65 W	117 W	$192
Core i5	12400F	6 (12)	—N/a	2.5	—N/a	4.4	—N/a	—N/a	—N/a	—N/a		18 MB	65 W	117 W	$167
Core i5	12400T	6 (12)	—N/a	1.8	—N/a	4.2	—N/a	—N/a	—N/a	UHD 730	1.45	18 MB	35 W	74 W	$192
Core i3	12300	4 (8)	—N/a	3.5	—N/a	4.4	—N/a	—N/a	—N/a	UHD 730	1.45	12 MB	60 W	89 W	$143
Core i3	12300T	4 (8)	—N/a	2.3	—N/a	4.2	—N/a	—N/a	—N/a	UHD 730	1.45	12 MB	35 W	69 W	$143
Core i3	12100	4 (8)	—N/a	3.3	—N/a	4.3	—N/a	—N/a	—N/a	UHD 730	1.40	12 MB	60 W	89 W	$122
Core i3	12100F	4 (8)	—N/a	3.3	—N/a	4.3	—N/a	—N/a	—N/a	—N/a		12 MB	58 W	89 W	$97
Core i3	12100T	4 (8)	—N/a	2.2	—N/a	4.1	—N/a	—N/a	—N/a	UHD 730	1.40	12 MB	35 W	69 W	$122
Pentium Gold	G7400	2 (4)	—N/a	3.7	—N/a	—N/a	—N/a	—N/a	—N/a	UHD 710	1.35	6 MB	46 W	—N/a	$64
Pentium Gold	G7400T	2 (4)	—N/a	3.1	—N/a	—N/a	—N/a	—N/a	—N/a	UHD 710	1.35	6 MB	35 W	—N/a	$64
Celeron	G6900	2 (2)	—N/a	3.4	—N/a	—N/a	—N/a	—N/a	—N/a	UHD 710	1.3	4 MB	46 W	—N/a	$42
Celeron	G6900T	2 (2)	—N/a	2.8	—N/a	—N/a	—N/a	—N/a	—N/a	UHD 710	1.3	4 MB	35 W	—N/a	$42

=== Mobile processors ===
==== Alder Lake-HX ====
- Desktop processors repurposed for mobile usage.
- Features UHD Graphics GPU with 32 EUs (i5-12450HX only has 16 EUs)
- CPUs in **bold** below feature UDIMM ECC memory support only when paired with a motherboard based on the WM690 mobile workstation chipset.

These CPUs feature 45 W minimum assured, 55 W base and 157 W maximum turbo power consumption.

Processor branding	Model	Cores (threads)		Base clock (GHz)		Turbo Boost (GHz)		GPU Max. clock rate (GHz)	Smart cache	Price (USD) (Note: Price is Recommended Customer Price (RCP) at launch. RCP is the trade price that processors are sold by Intel to retailers and OEMs. Actual MSRP for consumers is higher.)
Processor branding	Model	P	E	P	E	P	E	GPU Max. clock rate (GHz)	Smart cache	Price (USD)
Core i9	**12950HX**	8 (16)	8 (8)	2.3	1.7	5.0	3.6	1.55	30 MB	$590
Core i9	12900HX	8 (16)	8 (8)	2.3	1.7	5.0	3.6	1.55	30 MB	$668
Core i7	**12850HX**	8 (16)	8 (8)	2.1	1.5	4.8	3.4	1.45	25 MB	$428
Core i7	12800HX	8 (16)	8 (8)	2.0	1.5	4.8	3.4	1.45	25 MB	$502
Core i7	12650HX	6 (12)	8 (8)	2.0	1.5	4.7	3.3	1.45	24 MB	$472
Core i5	**12600HX**	4 (8)	8 (8)	2.5	1.8	4.6	3.3	1.35	18 MB	$284
Core i5	12450HX	4 (8)	4 (4)	2.4	1.8	4.4	3.1	1.30	12 MB	$312

==== Alder Lake-H ====
These CPUs feature 35 W minimum assured, 45 W base and 95 W (Core i5) or 115 W (Core i7/i9) maximum turbo power consumption.

Processor branding	Model	Cores (threads)		Base clock (GHz)		Turbo Boost (GHz)		Iris Xe Graphics		Smart cache	Price (USD)
Processor branding	Model	P	E	P	E	P	E	EUs	Boost clock (GHz)	Smart cache	Price (USD)
Core i9	12900HK	6 (12)	8 (8)	2.5	1.8	5.0	3.8	96	1.45	24 MB	$697
Core i9	12900H	6 (12)	8 (8)	2.5	1.8	5.0	3.8	96	1.45	24 MB	$617
Core i7	12800H	6 (12)	8 (8)	2.4	1.8	4.8	3.7	96	1.4	24 MB	$457
Core i7	12700H	6 (12)	8 (8)	2.3	1.7	4.7	3.5	96	1.4	24 MB	$502
Core i7	12650H	6 (12)	4 (4)	2.3	1.7	4.7	3.5	64	1.4	24 MB	$502
Core i5	12600H	4 (8)	8 (8)	2.7	2.0	4.5	3.3	80	1.4	18 MB	$311
Core i5	12500H	4 (8)	8 (8)	2.5	1.8	4.5	3.3	80	1.3	18 MB	$342
Core i5	12450H	4 (8)	4 (4)	2.0	1.5	4.4	3.3	48	1.2	12 MB	$342

==== Alder Lake-P ====
These CPUs feature 20 W minimum assured, 28 W base and 64 W maximum turbo power consumption.

Processor branding	Model	Cores (threads)		Base clock (GHz)		Turbo Boost (GHz)		Iris Xe Graphics		Smart cache	Price (USD)
Processor branding	Model	P	E	P	E	P	E	EUs	Boost clock (GHz)	Smart cache	Price (USD)
Core i7	1280P	6 (12)	8 (8)	1.8	1.3	4.8	3.6	96	1.45	24 MB	$482
Core i7	1270P	4 (8)	8 (8)	2.2	1.6	4.8	3.5	96	1.40	18 MB	$438
Core i7	1260P	4 (8)	8 (8)	2.1	1.5	4.7	3.4	96	1.40	18 MB	$480
Core i5	1250P	4 (8)	8 (8)	1.7	1.2	4.4	3.3	80	1.40	12 MB	$320
Core i5	1240P	4 (8)	8 (8)	1.7	1.2	4.4	3.3	80	1.30	12 MB	$353
Core i3	1220P	2 (4)	8 (8)	1.5	1.1	4.4	3.3	64	1.10	12 MB	$309

==== Alder Lake-U ====
Processor branding	Model	Cores (threads)		Base clock (GHz)		Turbo Boost (GHz)		Iris Xe Graphics		Smart cache	TDP		Price (USD)
Processor branding	Model	P	E	P	E	P	E	EUs	Boost clock (GHz)	Smart cache	Base	Turbo	Price (USD)
Core i7	1265U	2 (4)	8 (8)	1.8	1.3	4.8	3.6	96	1.25	12 MB	15 W	55 W	$426
Core i7	1260U	2 (4)	8 (8)	1.1	0.8	4.7	3.5	96	0.9	12 MB	9 W	29 W	$426
Core i7	1255U	2 (4)	8 (8)	1.7	1.2	4.7	3.5	96	1.25	12 MB	15 W	55 W	$426
Core i7	1250U	2 (4)	8 (8)	1.1	0.8	4.7	3.5	96	0.9	12 MB	9 W	29 W	$426
Core i5	1245U	2 (4)	8 (8)	1.6	1.2	4.4	3.3	80	1.2	12 MB	15 W	55 W	$309
Core i5	1240U	2 (4)	8 (8)	1.1	0.8	4.4	3.3	80	0.9	12 MB	9 W	29 W	$309
Core i5	1235U (with IPU)	2 (4)	8 (8)	1.3	0.9	4.4	3.3	80	1.2	12 MB	15 W	55 W	$309
Core i5	1230U	2 (4)	8 (8)	1.0	0.7	4.4	3.3	80	0.9	12 MB	9 W	29 W	$309
Core i3	1215U (with IPU)	2 (4)	4 (4)	1.2	0.9	4.4	3.3	64	1.1	10 MB	15 W	55 W	$281
Core i3	1210U	2 (4)	4 (4)	1.0	0.7	4.4	3.3	64	0.85	10 MB	9 W	29 W	$281
Pentium	8505 (with IPU)	1 (2)	4 (4)	1.2	0.9	4.4	3.3	48	0.9	8 MB	15 W	55 W	$161
Pentium	8500	1 (2)	4 (4)	1.0	0.7	4.4	3.3	48	0.7	8 MB	9 W	29 W	$161
Celeron	7305	1 (1)	4 (4)	1.1	0.9	—N/a		48	0.9	8 MB	15 W	55 W	$107
Celeron	7300	1 (1)	4 (4)	1.0	0.7	—N/a		48	0.7	8 MB	9 W	29 W	$107

==== Alder Lake-N ====
These CPUs feature only E-cores and have 6MB of Smart Cache.

Processor branding	Model	Cores (threads)	Base clock (GHz)	Turbo Boost (GHz)	UHD Graphics		TDP			Embedded options	Price (USD)
Processor branding	Model	Cores (threads)	Base clock (GHz)	Turbo Boost (GHz)	EUs	Boost clock (GHz)	Down (cTDP)	Base (PL1)	PL2	Embedded options	Price (USD)
Core i3	N305	8 (8)	1.8	3.8	32	1.25	9 W	15 W	35 W	Yes	$309
Core i3	N300	8 (8)	0.8	3.8	32	1.25	?	7 W	25 W	No	$309
Intel Processor	N200	4 (4)	1.0	3.7	32	0.75	0.1	6 W	25 W	Yes	$193
Intel Processor	N100	4 (4)	0.8	3.4	24	0.75	?	6 W	25 W	No	$55
Intel Processor	N97	4 (4)	2.0	3.6	24	1.2	?	12 W	?	Yes	$128
Intel Processor	N95	4 (4)	1.7	3.4	16	1.2	?	15 W	?	Yes	?
Intel Processor	N50	2 (2)	1.0	3.4	16	0.75	?	6 W	?	Yes	$128
Atom	x7425E	4 (4)	1.5	3.4	24	1.0	?	12 W	?	Yes	$58
Atom	x7213E	2 (2)	1.7	3.2	16	1.0	?	10 W	?	Yes	$47
Atom	x7211E	2 (2)	1.0	3.2	16	1.0	?	6 W	?	Yes	$39

==== Twin Lake-N ====
These CPUs feature only E-cores and have 6MB of Smart Cache.

Processor branding	Model	Cores (threads)	Base clock (GHz)	Turbo Boost (GHz)	UHD Graphics		TDP		Embedded options	Price (USD)
Processor branding	Model	Cores (threads)	Base clock (GHz)	Turbo Boost (GHz)	EUs	Boost clock (GHz)	Down	Base	Embedded options	Price (USD)
Core 3	N355	8 (8)	1.8	3.9	32	1.35	9 W	15 W	Yes	$309
Core 3	N350	8 (8)	0.8	3.9	32	1.35	?	7 W	No	$309
Intel Processor	N250	4 (4)	1.2	3.8	32	1.25	?	6 W	Yes	$193
Intel Processor	N150	4 (4)	0.8	3.6	24	1.0	?	6 W	No	$128

=== Processors for Internet of Things (IoT) devices and embedded systems (Alder Lake-PS) ===
Most of these processors are identical to the corresponding Alder Lake-H and Alder Lake-U processors (without the L suffix) listed above.

==== High-power ====
These CPUs feature 35 W minimum assured, 45 W base and 65 W maximum assured power consumption.

Processor branding	Model	Cores (threads)		Base clock rate (GHz)			Turbo Boost 3.0 (GHz)		Iris Xe Graphics		Smart cache	Price (USD)
Processor branding	Model	P	E	P		E	P	E	EUs	Max. clock rate (GHz)	Smart cache	Price (USD)
Processor branding	Model	P	E	@45 W	@35 W	E	P	E	EUs	Max. clock rate (GHz)	Smart cache	Price (USD)
Core i7	12800HL	6 (12)	8 (8)	2.4	1.6	1.8	4.8	3.7	96	1.4	24 MB	$457
Core i7	12700HL	6 (12)	8 (8)	2.3	1.6	1.7	4.7	3.5	96	1.4	24 MB	$430
Core i5	12600HL	4 (8)	8 (8)	2.7	1.7	2.0	4.5	3.3	80	1.4	18 MB	$311
Core i5	12500HL	4 (8)	8 (8)	2.5	1.7	1.8	4.5	3.3	80	1.3	18 MB	$279
Core i3	12300HL	4 (8)	4 (4)	2.0	1.1	1.5	4.4	3.3	48	1.2	12 MB	—N/a

==== Low-power ====
These CPUs feature 12 W minimum assured, 15 W base and 28 W maximum assured power consumption.

Processor branding	Model	Cores (threads)		Base clock rate (GHz)				Turbo Boost 3.0 (GHz)		Graphics			Smart cache	Price (USD)
Processor branding	Model	P	E	P			E	P	E	Brand	EUs	Max. clock rate (GHz)	Smart cache	Price (USD)
Processor branding	Model	P	E	@28 W	@15 W	@12 W	E	P	E	Brand	EUs	Max. clock rate (GHz)	Smart cache	Price (USD)
Core i7	1265UL	2 (4)	8 (8)	2.6	1.8	1.1	1.3	4.8	3.6	Iris Xe	96	1.25	12 MB	$426
Core i7	1255UL	2 (4)	8 (8)	2.6	1.7	1.1	1.2	4.7	3.5	Iris Xe	96	1.25	12 MB	$399
Core i5	1245UL	2 (4)	8 (8)	2.5	1.6	1.0	1.2	4.4	3.3 GHz	Iris Xe	80	1.2	12 MB	$309
Core i5	1235UL	2 (4)	8 (8)	2.5	1.3	1.0	1.1	4.4	3.3 GHz	Iris Xe	80	1.2	12 MB	$277
Core i3	1215UL	2 (4)	4 (4)	2.5	1.2	0.8	0.9	4.4	3.3 GHz	UHD	64	1.1	10 MB	$285
Celeron	7305L	1 (1)	4 (4)	—N/a	1.1	0.8	0.9	NA		UHD	48	1.1	8 MB	$107

== See also ==
- Sapphire Rapids, Intel's 4th generation Xeon server processors based on Golden Cove microarchitecture and Intel 7 process
- List of Intel CPU microarchitectures

== Notes ==
Atom (ULV)		Node name	Pentium/Core						
Microarch.	Step	Node name	Microarch.	Step					
		600 nm	P6	Pentium Pro (133 MHz)					
		500 nm	P6	Pentium Pro (150 MHz)					
		350 nm	P6	Pentium Pro (166–200 MHz)					
		350 nm	P6	Klamath					
		250 nm	P6	Deschutes					
		250 nm	P6	Katmai	NetBurst				
		180 nm	P6	Coppermine	Willamette				
		130 nm	P6	Tualatin	Northwood				
		130 nm	Pentium M (P6)	Banias	Northwood		NetBurst(HT)		NetBurst(×2)
		90 nm	Pentium M (P6)	Dothan	Prescott	⇨	Prescott‑2M	⇨	Smithfield
		90 nm	Pentium M (P6)	Dothan	~~Tejas~~	→	⇩	→	~~Cedarmill (Tejas)~~
		65 nm	Pentium M (P6)	Yonah	~~Nehalem (NetBurst)~~		Cedar Mill	⇨	Presler
		65 nm	Core	Merom	4 cores on mainstream desktop, DDR3 introduced				
Bonnell	Bonnell	45 nm	Core	Penryn					
Bonnell	Bonnell	45 nm	Nehalem	Nehalem	HT reintroduced, integrated MC, PCH; L3-cache introduced, 256 KB L2-cache/core				
Bonnell	Saltwell	32 nm	Nehalem	Westmere	Introduced GPU on same package and AES-NI				
Bonnell	Saltwell	32 nm	Sandy Bridge	Sandy Bridge	On-die ring bus, no more non-UEFI motherboards				
Silvermont	Silvermont	22 nm	Sandy Bridge	Ivy Bridge					
Silvermont	Silvermont	22 nm	Haswell	Haswell	Fully integrated voltage regulator				
Silvermont	Airmont	14 nm	Haswell	Broadwell					
Silvermont	Airmont	14 nm	Skylake	Skylake	DDR4 introduced on mainstream desktop				
Goldmont		14 nm	Skylake	Kaby Lake					
Goldmont		14 nm	Skylake	Coffee Lake	6 cores on mainstream desktop				
Goldmont		14 nm	Skylake	Amber Lake	Mobile-only				
Goldmont Plus		14 nm	Skylake	Whiskey Lake	Mobile-only				
Goldmont Plus		14 nm	Skylake	Coffee Lake Refresh	8 cores on mainstream desktop				
Goldmont Plus		14 nm	Skylake	Comet Lake	10 cores on mainstream desktop				
Goldmont Plus		14 nm	Sunny Cove	Cypress Cove (Rocket Lake)	Backported Sunny Cove microarchitecture for 14 nm				
Tremont		10 nm	Skylake	Palm Cove (Cannon Lake)	Mobile-only				
Tremont		10 nm	Sunny Cove	Sunny Cove (Ice Lake)	512 KB L2-cache/core				
Tremont		10 nm	Sunny Cove	Willow Cove (Tiger Lake)	X^{e} graphics engine				
Gracemont		Intel 7 (10 nm ESF)	Golden Cove	Golden Cove (Alder Lake)	Hybrid, DDR5, PCIe 5.0				
Gracemont		Intel 7 (10 nm ESF)	Golden Cove	Raptor Cove (Raptor Lake)					
Crestmont		Intel 4	Redwood Cove	Meteor Lake	Mobile-only; NPU, chiplet architecture				
Crestmont		Intel 3	Redwood Cove	Arrow Lake-U					
Skymont		TSMC N3B	Lion Cove	Lunar Lake	Low power mobile only (9–30 W)				
Skymont		TSMC N3B	Lion Cove	Arrow Lake					
Darkmont		Intel 18A	Cougar Cove	Panther Lake					
Arctic Wolf		Intel 18A and/or TSMC N2P	Coyote Cove	Nova Lake					
