= Goldmont =

CPU microarchitecture used in Intel SoCs

General information
- Product code: 80668 (Apollo Lake); 80765 (Denverton)

Physical specifications
- Cores: 2–4

Architecture and classification
- Technology node: 14 nm
- Instructions: x86-64, Intel 64
- Extensions: MMX, SSE, SSE2, SSE3, SSSE3, SSE4, SSE4.1, SSE4.2; AES-NI, RDRAND, CLMUL, SHA; VT-x, VT-d

Products, models, variants
- Brand names: Atom; Celeron; Pentium

History
- Predecessor: Airmont (die shrink)
- Successor: Goldmont Plus (optimization)

Goldmont is a microarchitecture for low-power Atom, Celeron and Pentium branded processors used in systems on a chip (SoCs) made by Intel. They allow only one thread per core.

The Apollo Lake platform with 14 nm Goldmont core was unveiled at the Intel Developer Forum (IDF) in Shenzhen, China, April 2016. The Goldmont architecture borrows heavily from the Skylake Core processors, so it offers a more than 30 percent performance boost compared to the previous Braswell platform, and it can be used to implement power-efficient low-end devices including Cloudbooks, 2-in-1 netbooks, small PCs, IP cameras, and in-car entertainment systems.

== Design ==
Goldmont is the 2nd generation out-of-order low-power Atom microarchitecture designed for the entry level desktop and notebook computers. Goldmont is built on the 14 nm manufacturing process and supports up to four cores for the consumer devices. It includes the Intel Gen9 graphics architecture introduced with the Skylake.

The Goldmont microarchitecture builds on the success of the Silvermont microarchitecture, and provides the following enhancements:

- An out-of-order execution engine with a 3-wide superscalar pipeline. Specifically:
  - The decoder can decode 3 instructions per cycle.
  - The microcode sequencer can send 3 μops per cycle for allocation into the reservation stations.
  - Retirement supports a peak rate of 3 per cycle.
- Enhancement in branch prediction which de-couples the fetch pipeline from the instruction decoder.
- Larger out-of-order execution window and buffers that enable deeper out-of-order execution across integer, FP/SIMD, and memory instruction types.
- Fully out-of-order memory execution and disambiguation. The Goldmont microarchitecture can execute one load and one store per cycle (compared to one load or one store per cycle in the Silvermont microarchitecture). The memory execution pipeline also includes a second level TLB enhancement with 512 entries for 4KB pages.
- Integer execution cluster in the Goldmont microarchitecture provides three pipelines and can execute up to three simple integer ALU operations per cycle.
- SIMD integer and floating-point instructions execute in a 128-bit wide engine. Throughput and latency of many instructions have improved, including PSHUFB with 1-cycle throughput (versus 5 cycles for Silvermont microarchitecture) and many other SIMD instructions with doubled throughput.
- Throughput and latency of instructions for accelerating encryption/decryption (AES) and carry-less multiplication (PCLMULQDQ) have been improved significantly in the Goldmont microarchitecture.
- The Goldmont microarchitecture provides new instructions with hardware accelerated secure hashing algorithm, SHA1 and SHA256.
- The Goldmont microarchitecture also adds support for the RDSEED instruction for random number generation meeting the NIST SP800-90C standard.
- PAUSE instruction latency is optimized to enable better power efficiency.

== Technology ==
- A 14 nm manufacturing process
- System on chip architecture
- 3D tri-gate transistors
- Consumer chips up to quad-cores
- Supports SSE4.2 instruction set
- Supports Intel AESNI and PCLMUL instructions
- Supports Intel RDRAND and RDSEED instructions
- Supports Intel SHA extensions
- Supports Intel MPX (Memory Protection Extensions)
- Gen 9 Intel HD Graphics with DirectX 12, OpenGL 4.6 with latest Windows 10 driver update (OpenGL 4.5 on Linux), OpenGL ES 3.2 and OpenCL 2.0 support.
- HEVC Main10 & VP9 Profile0 hardware decoding support
- 10 W thermal design power (TDP) Desktop or Server processors
- 4.0 to 6.0 W TDP mobile processors
- eMMC 5.0 technology to connect to NAND flash storage
- USB 3.1 & USB-C specification
- Support for DDR3L, LPDDR3, and LPDDR4 memory
- Integrated Sensor Hub (ISH) which can sample and combine data from individual sensors and operate independently when the host platform is in a low power state
- Image Signal Processor (ISP) supporting four concurrent camera streams
- Audio controller supporting HD Audio and LPE Audio
- Trusted Execution Engine 3.0 security subsystem

== Erratum ==
Similar to the previous Silvermont generation, design flaws were found in processor circuitry, resulting in cease of operation when processors are actively used for several years. An Erratum named APL46 "System May Experience Inability to Boot or May Cease Operation" was added to documentation in June 2017, stating that low pin count (LPC), real time clock (RTC), SD card and GPIO interfaces may stop functioning.

Mitigations were found to limit impact on systems. A firmware update for the LPC bus called LPC_CLKRUN# reduces the utilization of the LPC interface, which in turn decreases (but does not eliminate) LPC bus degradation – some systems are however not compatible with this new firmware. It is recommended not to use SD cards as boot devices, and to remove the card from the system when not in use; other possible solutions being using only UHS-I cards and operating them at 1.8 V.

Congatec also states the issues impact USB buses and eMMC, although those are not mentioned in Intel's public documentation. USB should have a maximum of 12% active time and there is a 60TB transmit traffic life expectancy over the lifetime of the port. eMMC should have a maximum of 33% active time and should be set to D3 device low power state by the operating system when not in use. Newer designs such as Atom C3000 Denverton do not seem to be affected.

== List of Goldmont processors ==
=== Desktop processors (Apollo Lake) ===
List of desktop processors as follows:

Target segment	Cores (threads = cores)	Processor branding & model		GPU model		TDP (W)	CPU freq. (GHz)		GPU freq. (MHz)		L2 cache	Release date	Price (USD)
Target segment	Cores (threads = cores)	Processor branding & model		Brand name & model number	EU	TDP (W)	Base	Turbo	Base	Turbo	L2 cache	Release date	Price (USD)
Desktop	4 (4)	Pentium	J4205	HD Graphics 505	18	10	1.5	2.6	250	800	2 MB	Q3 2016	$161
Desktop	4 (4)	Celeron	J3455	HD Graphics 500	12	10	1.5	2.3	250	750	2 MB	Q3 2016	$107
Desktop	2 (2)	Celeron	J3355	HD Graphics 500	12	10	2.0	2.5	250	700	2 MB	Q3 2016	$107

=== Server processors (Denverton) ===
Target segment	Cores (threads)	Processor branding & model		TDP (W)	CPU freq. (GHz)		L2 cache	DDR4 speed	Release date	Price (USD)
Target segment	Cores (threads)	Processor branding & model		TDP (W)	Base	Turbo	L2 cache	DDR4 speed	Release date	Price (USD)
Server	16 (16)	Atom	C3958	31	2.0		16 MB	2400	Q3 2017	$449
Server	16 (16)	Atom	C3955	32	2.1	2.4	16 MB	2400	Q3 2017	$434
Server	12 (12)	Atom	C3858	25	2.0		12 MB	2400	Q3 2017	$332
Server	12 (12)	Atom	C3850	25	2.1	2.4	12 MB	2400	Q3 2017	$323
Server	12 (12)	Atom	C3830	21	1.9	2.3	12 MB	2133	Q3 2017	$289
Server	12 (12)	Atom	C3808	25	2.0		12 MB	2133	Q3 2017	$369
Server	8 (8)	Atom	C3758	25	2.2		16 MB	2400	Q3 2017	$193
Server	8 (8)	Atom	C3750	21	2.2	2.4	16 MB	2400	Q3 2017	$171
Server	8 (8)	Atom	C3708	17	1.7		16 MB	2133	Q3 2017	$209
Server	4 (4)	Atom	C3558	16	2.2		8 MB	2133	Q3 2017	$86
Server	4 (4)	Atom	C3538	15	2.1		8 MB	2133	Q3 2017	$75
Server	4 (4)	Atom	C3508	11.25	1.6		8 MB	1866	Q3 2017	$86
Server	2 (2)	Atom	C3338	9	1.5	2.2	4 MB	1866	Q1 2017	$27
Server	2 (2)	Atom	C3308	9.5	1.6	2.1	4 MB	1866	Q3 2017	$32

=== Mobile processors (Apollo Lake) ===
List of mobile processors as follows:

Target segment	Cores (Threads)	Processor branding & model		GPU model		TDP (W)	CPU freq. (GHz)		GPU freq. (MHz)		L2 cache	Release date	Price (USD)
Target segment	Cores (Threads)	Processor branding & model		Brand name & model number	EU	TDP (W)	Base	Turbo	Base	Turbo	L2 cache	Release date	Price (USD)
Mobile	4 (4)	Pentium	N4200	HD Graphics 505	18	6	1.1	2.5	200	750	2 MB	Q3 2016	$161
Mobile	4 (4)	Celeron	N3450	HD Graphics 500	12	6	1.1	2.2	200	700	2 MB	Q3 2016	$107
Mobile	2 (2)	Celeron	N3350	HD Graphics 500	12	6	1.1	2.4	200	650	2 MB	Q3 2016	$107

=== Embedded processors (Apollo Lake) ===
List of embedded processors as follows:

Target segment	Cores (threads)	Processor branding & model		GPU model		TDP (W)	CPU freq. (GHz)		GPU freq. (MHz)		L2 cache	Release date	Price (USD)
Target segment	Cores (threads)	Processor branding & model		Brand name & model number	EU	TDP (W)	Base	Turbo	Base	Turbo	L2 cache	Release date	Price (USD)
Embedded	4 (4)	Atom x7	E3950	HD Graphics 505	18	12	1.6	2.0	500	650	2 MB	Q3 2016	?
Embedded	4 (4)	Atom x5	E3940	HD Graphics 500	12	9.5	1.6	1.8	400	600	2 MB	Q3 2016	?
Embedded	2 (2)	Atom x5	E3930	HD Graphics 500	12	6.5	1.3	1.8	400	550	2 MB	Q3 2016	?

=== Automotive processors (Apollo Lake) ===
There is also an Atom A3900 series exclusively for automotive customers with AEC-Q100 qualification:

Target segment	Cores (threads)	Processor branding & model		GPU model		TDP (W)	CPU freq. (GHz)		GPU freq. (MHz)		L2 cache	Release date	Price (USD)
Target segment	Cores (threads)	Processor branding & model		Brand name & model number	EU	TDP (W)	Base	Turbo	Normal	Turbo	L2 cache	Release date	Price (USD)
Automotive	4 (4)	Atom x7	A3960	HD Graphics 505	18	12.5	1.9	2.4	600	750	2 MB	?	
Automotive	4 (4)	Atom x7	A3950	HD Graphics 505	18	9.5	1.6	2.0	500	650	2 MB	?	
Automotive	4 (4)	Atom x5	A3940	HD Graphics 500	12	8	1.6	1.8	400	600	2 MB	?	
Automotive	2 (2)	Atom x5	A3930	HD Graphics 500	12	6	1.3	1.8	400	550	2 MB	?	

=== Tablet processors (Willow Trail) ===
Willow Trail platform was canceled. Apollo Lake was offered instead.

== See also ==
- List of Intel CPU microarchitectures
- List of Intel Pentium microprocessors
- List of Intel Celeron microprocessors
- List of Intel Atom microprocessors
- Atom (system on chip)

Atom (ULV)		Node name	Pentium/Core						
Microarch.	Step	Node name	Microarch.	Step					
		600 nm	P6	Pentium Pro (133 MHz)					
		500 nm	P6	Pentium Pro (150 MHz)					
		350 nm	P6	Pentium Pro (166–200 MHz)					
		350 nm	P6	Klamath					
		250 nm	P6	Deschutes					
		250 nm	P6	Katmai	NetBurst				
		180 nm	P6	Coppermine	Willamette				
		130 nm	P6	Tualatin	Northwood				
		130 nm	Pentium M (P6)	Banias	Northwood		NetBurst(HT)		NetBurst(×2)
		90 nm	Pentium M (P6)	Dothan	Prescott	⇨	Prescott‑2M	⇨	Smithfield
		90 nm	Pentium M (P6)	Dothan	~~Tejas~~	→	⇩	→	~~Cedarmill (Tejas)~~
		65 nm	Pentium M (P6)	Yonah	~~Nehalem (NetBurst)~~		Cedar Mill	⇨	Presler
		65 nm	Core	Merom	4 cores on mainstream desktop, DDR3 introduced				
Bonnell	Bonnell	45 nm	Core	Penryn					
Bonnell	Bonnell	45 nm	Nehalem	Nehalem	HT reintroduced, integrated MC, PCH; L3-cache introduced, 256 KB L2-cache/core				
Bonnell	Saltwell	32 nm	Nehalem	Westmere	Introduced GPU on same package and AES-NI				
Bonnell	Saltwell	32 nm	Sandy Bridge	Sandy Bridge	On-die ring bus, no more non-UEFI motherboards				
Silvermont	Silvermont	22 nm	Sandy Bridge	Ivy Bridge					
Silvermont	Silvermont	22 nm	Haswell	Haswell	Fully integrated voltage regulator				
Silvermont	Airmont	14 nm	Haswell	Broadwell					
Silvermont	Airmont	14 nm	Skylake	Skylake	DDR4 introduced on mainstream desktop				
Goldmont		14 nm	Skylake	Kaby Lake					
Goldmont		14 nm	Skylake	Coffee Lake	6 cores on mainstream desktop				
Goldmont		14 nm	Skylake	Amber Lake	Mobile-only				
Goldmont Plus		14 nm	Skylake	Whiskey Lake	Mobile-only				
Goldmont Plus		14 nm	Skylake	Coffee Lake Refresh	8 cores on mainstream desktop				
Goldmont Plus		14 nm	Skylake	Comet Lake	10 cores on mainstream desktop				
Goldmont Plus		14 nm	Sunny Cove	Cypress Cove (Rocket Lake)	Backported Sunny Cove microarchitecture for 14 nm				
Tremont		10 nm	Skylake	Palm Cove (Cannon Lake)	Mobile-only				
Tremont		10 nm	Sunny Cove	Sunny Cove (Ice Lake)	512 KB L2-cache/core				
Tremont		10 nm	Sunny Cove	Willow Cove (Tiger Lake)	X^{e} graphics engine				
Gracemont		Intel 7 (10 nm ESF)	Golden Cove	Golden Cove (Alder Lake)	Hybrid, DDR5, PCIe 5.0				
Gracemont		Intel 7 (10 nm ESF)	Golden Cove	Raptor Cove (Raptor Lake)					
Crestmont		Intel 4	Redwood Cove	Meteor Lake	Mobile-only; NPU, chiplet architecture				
Crestmont		Intel 3	Redwood Cove	Arrow Lake-U					
Skymont		TSMC N3B	Lion Cove	Lunar Lake	Low power mobile only (9–30 W)				
Skymont		TSMC N3B	Lion Cove	Arrow Lake					
Darkmont		Intel 18A	Cougar Cove	Panther Lake					
Arctic Wolf		Intel 18A and/or TSMC N2P	Coyote Cove	Nova Lake					
