= Gracemont (microarchitecture) =

CPU microarchitecture by Intel

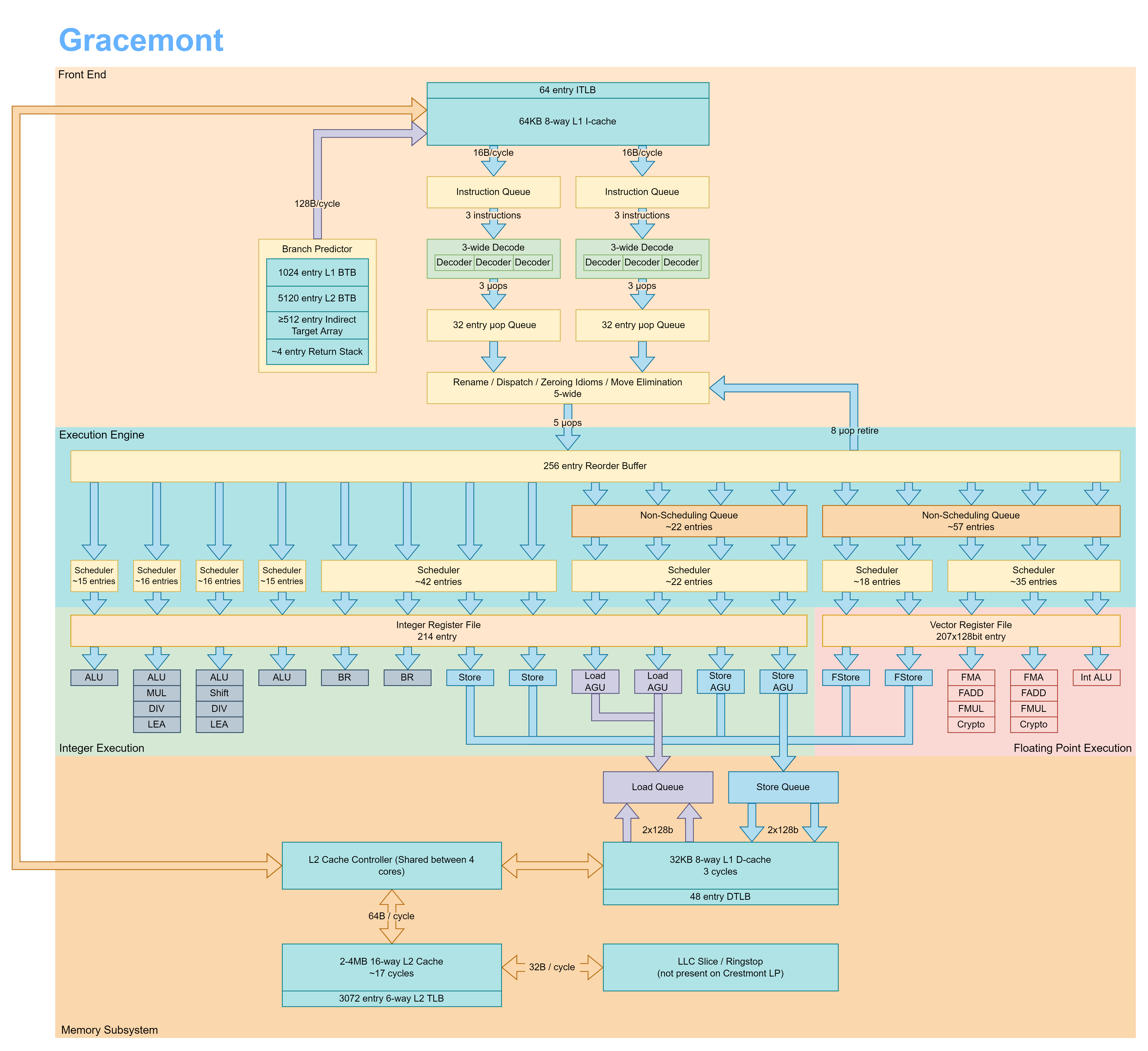

General information
- Launched: November 4, 2021; 4 years ago
- Marketed by: Intel
- Designed by: Intel
- Common manufacturer: Intel

Performance
- Max. CPU clock rate: 0.7 GHz to 4.3 GHz

Physical specifications
- Cores: 4 per module

Cache
- L1 cache: 96 KB per core: 64 KB instructions; 32 KB data
- L2 cache: 2 or 4 MB per module
- L3 cache: 3 MB per module

Architecture and classification
- Instruction set: x86-64
- Extensions: MMX, SSE, SSE2, SSE3, SSSE3, SSE4.1, SSE4.2, AVX, AVX2, FMA3, AVX-VNNI, AES-NI, CLMUL, RDRAND, SHA, TXT, VT-d, VT-x

Products, models, variants
- Product code names: Alder Lake (client); Raptor Lake (client)

History
- Predecessor: Tremont
- Successor: Crestmont

Gracemont is a microarchitecture for low-power processors used in systems on a chip (SoCs) made by Intel, and is the successor to Tremont. Like its predecessor, it is also implemented as low-power cores in a hybrid design of the Alder Lake, Raptor Lake and Raptor Lake Refresh processors.

== Design ==
Gracemont is the fourth generation out-of-order low-power Atom microarchitecture, built on the Intel 7 manufacturing process.

The Gracemont microarchitecture has the following enhancements over Tremont:

- Level 1 cache per core:
  - Eight-way-associative 64 KB instruction cache
  - Eight-way-associative 32 KB data cache
- New on-demand instruction-length decoder
- Instruction issue increased to five per clock (from four)
- Instruction retire increased to eight per clock (from seven)
- Execution ports (functional units) there are now 17 (from ten)
- Reorder buffer increased to 256 entries (from 208)
- Improved branch prediction
- Support for AVX, AVX2, FMA3 and AVX-VNNI instructions
- 2 or 4 MB shared L2 cache per 4-core cluster. Alder Lake family has 2 MB. Higher-end Raptor Lake family with Raptor Cove has 4 MB, while Lower-end Raptor Lake family with Golden Cove has 2 MB.

== Technology ==
- System on a chip (SoC) architecture
- 3D tri-gate transistors
- Thermal design power (TDP)
  - 10 W desktop processors
  - 6 W mobile processors

== List of Gracemont processors ==
The microarchitecture is used as the efficient cores of the 12th generation of Intel Core hybrid processors (codenamed "Alder Lake"), the 13th generation of Intel Core hybrid processors (codenamed "Raptor Lake") and the 14th generation of Intel Core hybrid processors (codenamed "Raptor Lake Refresh"). It's also used in the Alder Lake-N line-up as the only core cluster, intended for low-power applications.

=== Alder Lake-N ===
Branding	Model	Cores (threads)	Clock rate (GHz)		GPU				Cache		TDP		Release date	Price (USD) (Note: Price is Recommended Customer Price (RCP) at launch. RCP is the trade price that processors are sold by Intel to retailers and OEMs. Actual MSRP for consumers is higher.)
Branding	Model	Cores (threads)	Base	Turbo	Model	EUs	Clock rate (GHz)		L2	L3	Base	cTDP Down	Release date	Price (USD)
Branding	Model	Cores (threads)	Base	Turbo	Model	EUs	Base	Turbo	L2	L3	Base	cTDP Down	Release date	Price (USD)
Core i3	N305	8 (8)	1.8	3.8	UHD; Graphics	32	?	1.25	2 MB	6 MB	15 W	9 W	Jan 3, 2023	$309
Core i3	N300	8 (8)	1.1	3.8	UHD; Graphics	32	?	1.25	2 MB	6 MB	7 W	—N/a	Jan 3, 2023	$309
Intel; Processor	N200	4 (4)	0.8	3.7	UHD; Graphics	32	?	0.75	2 MB	6 MB	6 W	—N/a	Jan 3, 2023	$193
Intel; Processor	N100	4 (4)	0.8	3.4	UHD; Graphics	24	?	0.75	2 MB	6 MB	6 W	—N/a	Jan 3, 2023	$128
Intel; Processor	N97	4 (4)	2.0	3.6	UHD; Graphics	24	0.85	1.2	2 MB	6 MB	12 W	—N/a	Jan 3, 2023	$128
Intel; Processor	N95	4 (4)	1.7	3.4	UHD; Graphics	16	?	1.2	2 MB	6 MB	15 W	—N/a	Jan 3, 2023	?
Intel; Processor	N50	2 (2)	1.0	3.4	UHD; Graphics	16	0.6	0.75	2 MB	6 MB	6 W	—N/a	Jan 3, 2023	$128
Atom	x7425E	4 (4)	1.5	3.4	UHD; Graphics	24	0.8	1.0	2 MB	6 MB	12 W	—N/a	Jan 3, 2023	$58
Atom	x7213E	2 (2)	1.7	3.2	UHD; Graphics	16	0.8	1.0	2 MB	6 MB	10 W	—N/a	Jan 3, 2023	$47
Atom	x7211E	2 (2)	1.0	3.2	UHD; Graphics	16	0.6	1.0	2 MB	6 MB	6 W	—N/a	Jan 3, 2023	$39

== See also ==
- List of Intel CPU microarchitectures

Atom (ULV)		Node name	Pentium/Core						
Microarch.	Step	Node name	Microarch.	Step					
		600 nm	P6	Pentium Pro (133 MHz)					
		500 nm	P6	Pentium Pro (150 MHz)					
		350 nm	P6	Pentium Pro (166–200 MHz)					
		350 nm	P6	Klamath					
		250 nm	P6	Deschutes					
		250 nm	P6	Katmai	NetBurst				
		180 nm	P6	Coppermine	Willamette				
		130 nm	P6	Tualatin	Northwood				
		130 nm	Pentium M	Banias	Northwood		NetBurst(HT)		NetBurst(×2)
		90 nm	Pentium M	Dothan	Prescott	⇨	Prescott‑2M	⇨	Smithfield
		90 nm	Pentium M	Dothan	~~Tejas~~	→	⇩	→	~~Cedarmill (Tejas)~~
		65 nm	Pentium M	Yonah	~~Nehalem (NetBurst)~~		Cedar Mill	⇨	Presler
		65 nm	Core	Merom	4 cores on mainstream desktop, DDR3 introduced				
Bonnell	Bonnell	45 nm	Core	Penryn					
Bonnell	Bonnell	45 nm	Nehalem	Nehalem	HT reintroduced, integrated MC, PCH; L3-cache introduced, 256 KB L2-cache/core				
Bonnell	Saltwell	32 nm	Nehalem	Westmere	Introduced GPU on same package and AES-NI				
Bonnell	Saltwell	32 nm	Sandy Bridge	Sandy Bridge	On-die ring bus, no more non-UEFI motherboards				
Silvermont	Silvermont	22 nm	Sandy Bridge	Ivy Bridge					
Silvermont	Silvermont	22 nm	Haswell	Haswell	Fully integrated voltage regulator				
Silvermont	Airmont	14 nm	Haswell	Broadwell					
Silvermont	Airmont	14 nm	Skylake	Skylake	DDR4 introduced on mainstream desktop				
Goldmont		14 nm	Skylake	Kaby Lake					
Goldmont		14 nm	Skylake	Coffee Lake	6 cores on mainstream desktop				
Goldmont		14 nm	Skylake	Amber Lake	Mobile-only				
Goldmont Plus		14 nm	Skylake	Whiskey Lake	Mobile-only				
Goldmont Plus		14 nm	Skylake	Coffee Lake Refresh	8 cores on mainstream desktop				
Goldmont Plus		14 nm	Skylake	Comet Lake	10 cores on mainstream desktop				
Goldmont Plus		14 nm	Sunny Cove	Cypress Cove (Rocket Lake)	Backported Sunny Cove microarchitecture for 14 nm				
Tremont		10 nm	Skylake	Palm Cove (Cannon Lake)	Mobile-only				
Tremont		10 nm	Sunny Cove	Sunny Cove (Ice Lake)	512 KB L2-cache/core				
Tremont		10 nm	Sunny Cove	Willow Cove (Tiger Lake)	X^{e} graphics engine				
Gracemont		Intel 7 (10 nm ESF)	Golden Cove	Golden Cove (Alder Lake)	Hybrid, DDR5, PCIe 5.0				
Gracemont		Intel 7 (10 nm ESF)	Golden Cove	Raptor Cove (Raptor Lake)					
Crestmont		Intel 4	Redwood Cove	Meteor Lake	Mobile-only; NPU, chiplet architecture				
Crestmont		Intel 3	Redwood Cove	Arrow Lake-U					
Skymont		TSMC N3B	Lion Cove	Lunar Lake	Low power mobile only (9–30 W)				
Skymont		TSMC N3B	Lion Cove	Arrow Lake					
Darkmont		Intel 18A	Cougar Cove	Panther Lake					
Arctic Wolf		Intel 18A and/or TSMC N2P	Coyote Cove	Nova Lake					
