= Goldmont Plus =

CPU microarchitecture

General information
- Launched: December 11, 2017
- Product code: 80680

Architecture and classification
- Technology node: 14 nm
- Instruction set: x86
- Instructions: x86-64, Intel 64
- Extensions: MMX, SSE, SSE2, SSE3, SSSE3, SSE4, SSE4.1, SSE4.2; AES-NI, RDRAND, CLMUL, SHA, SGX; VT-x, VT-d

Physical specifications
- Cores: 2 or 4

Products, models, variants
- Model: Celeron; Pentium Silver

History
- Predecessor: Goldmont
- Successor: Tremont

Goldmont Plus is a microarchitecture for low-power Celeron and Pentium Silver branded processors used in systems on a chip (SoCs) made by Intel. The Gemini Lake platform with 14 nm Goldmont Plus core was officially launched on December 11, 2017. Intel launched the Gemini Lake Refresh platform on November 4, 2019.

== Design ==
Goldmont Plus is an enhanced 2nd generation out-of-order low-power Atom microarchitecture designed for entry level desktop and notebook computers. Goldmont Plus is built on the 14 nm manufacturing process and supports up to four cores for the consumer devices. It includes the Intel Gen9 graphics architecture with improvements introduced with the Kaby Lake microarchitecture.

The Goldmont Plus microarchitecture builds on the success of the Goldmont microarchitecture, and provides the following enhancements:

- Widened previous generation Atom processor back-end pipeline to 4-wide allocation to 4-wide retire, while maintaining 3-wide fetch and decode pipeline.
- Enhanced branch prediction unit.
- 64 KB shared second level pre-decode cache (16 KB in Goldmont microarchitecture).
- Larger reservation station and re-order buffer entries to support large out-of-order window.
- Wider integer execution unit. New dedicated JEU port with support for faster branch redirection.
- Radix-1024 floating point divider for fast scalar/packed single, double and extended precision floating point divides.
- Improved AES-NI instruction latency and throughput.
- Larger load and store buffers. Improved store-to-load forwarding latency store data from register.
- Shared instruction and data second level TLB. Paging cache enhancements (PxE/ePxE caches).
- Modular system design with four cores sharing up to 4 MB L2 cache.
- Support for Read Processor ID (RDPID) new instruction.

== Technology ==
- A 14 nm manufacturing process
- System on a chip architecture
- 3D tri-gate transistors
- Consumer chips up to four cores
- Supports SSE4.2 instruction set
- Supports Intel AESNI and PCLMUL instructions
- Supports Intel RDRAND and RDSEED instructions
- Supports Intel SHA extensions
- Supports Intel MPX (Memory Protection Extensions)
- Supports Intel SGX
- 4 MB L2 cache, up from 2 MB in Goldmont
- Updated Gen 9 Intel HD Graphics with DirectX 12, OpenGL 4.6, OpenGL ES 3.2 and OpenCL 2.0 support.
- HEVC Main10 & VP9 10-bit Profile2 hardware decoding support
- Integrated native HDMI 2.0 display controller (Goldmont only supported HDMI 1.4 natively)
- 10 W thermal design power (TDP) desktop processors
- 4.8 to 6.0 W TDP mobile processors
- eMMC 5.1 technology to connect to NAND flash storage
- USB 3.1 and USB-C specification
- Support for DDR4 and LPDDR4 memory
- Supports CNVi

== List of Goldmont Plus processors ==
=== Gemini Lake ===
Target segment	CPU			GPU			TDP (W)	CPU freq. (GHz)		GPU freq. (MHz)		L2 cache	Release date	Price (US$)
Target segment	Brand	Model	Cores (threads)	Brand	Model	EU	TDP (W)	Base	Turbo	Base	Turbo	L2 cache	Release date	Price (US$)
Desktop	Pentium Silver	J5005	4 (4)	UHD Graphics	605	18	10	1.5	2.8	250	800	4 MB	Q4 2017	161
Desktop	Celeron	J4105	4 (4)	UHD Graphics	600	12	10	1.5	2.5	250	750	4 MB	Q4 2017	107
Desktop	Celeron	J4005	2 (2)	UHD Graphics	600	12	10	2.0	2.7	250	700	4 MB	Q4 2017	107
Mobile	Pentium Silver	N5000	4 (4)	UHD Graphics	605	18	6	1.1	2.7	200	750	4 MB	Q4 2017	161
Mobile	Celeron	N4100	4 (4)	UHD Graphics	600	12	6	1.1	2.4	200	700	4 MB	Q4 2017	107
Mobile	Celeron	N4000	2 (2)	UHD Graphics	600	12	6	1.1	2.6	200	650	4 MB	Q4 2017	107

=== Gemini Lake Refresh ===
Target segment	CPU			GPU			TDP (W)	CPU freq. (GHz)		GPU freq. (MHz)		L2 cache	Release date	Price (US$)
Target segment	Brand	Model	Cores (threads)	Brand	Model	EU	TDP (W)	Base	Turbo	Base	Turbo	L2 cache	Release date	Price (US$)
Desktop	Pentium Silver	J5040	4 (4)	UHD Graphics	605	18	10	2.0	3.2	250	800	4 MB	Q4 2019	161
Desktop	Celeron	J4125	4 (4)	UHD Graphics	600	12	10	2.0	2.7	250	750	4 MB	Q4 2019	107
Desktop	Celeron	J4025	2 (2)	UHD Graphics	600	12	10	2.0	2.9	250	700	4 MB	Q4 2019	107
Mobile	Pentium Silver	N5030	4 (4)	UHD Graphics	605	18	6	1.1	3.1	200	750	4 MB	Q4 2019	161
Mobile	Celeron	N4120	4 (4)	UHD Graphics	600	12	6	1.1	2.6	200	700	4 MB	Q4 2019	107
Mobile	Celeron	N4020	2 (2)	UHD Graphics	600	12	6	1.1	2.8	200	650	4 MB	Q4 2019	107

== See also ==
- List of Intel CPU microarchitectures
- List of Intel Pentium processors
- List of Intel Celeron processors
- List of Intel Atom processors
- Atom (system on chip)

Atom (ULV)		Node name	Pentium/Core						
Microarch.	Step	Node name	Microarch.	Step					
		600 nm	P6	Pentium Pro (133 MHz)					
		500 nm	P6	Pentium Pro (150 MHz)					
		350 nm	P6	Pentium Pro (166–200 MHz)					
		350 nm	P6	Klamath					
		250 nm	P6	Deschutes					
		250 nm	P6	Katmai	NetBurst				
		180 nm	P6	Coppermine	Willamette				
		130 nm	P6	Tualatin	Northwood				
		130 nm	Pentium M	Banias	Northwood		NetBurst(HT)		NetBurst(×2)
		90 nm	Pentium M	Dothan	Prescott	⇨	Prescott‑2M	⇨	Smithfield
		90 nm	Pentium M	Dothan	~~Tejas~~	→	⇩	→	~~Cedarmill (Tejas)~~
		65 nm	Pentium M	Yonah	~~Nehalem (NetBurst)~~		Cedar Mill	⇨	Presler
		65 nm	Core	Merom	4 cores on mainstream desktop, DDR3 introduced				
Bonnell	Bonnell	45 nm	Core	Penryn					
Bonnell	Bonnell	45 nm	Nehalem	Nehalem	HT reintroduced, integrated MC, PCH; L3-cache introduced, 256KB L2-cache/core				
Bonnell	Saltwell	32 nm	Nehalem	Westmere	Introduced GPU on same package and AES-NI				
Bonnell	Saltwell	32 nm	Sandy Bridge	Sandy Bridge	On-die ring bus, no more non-UEFI motherboards				
Silvermont	Silvermont	22 nm	Sandy Bridge	Ivy Bridge					
Silvermont	Silvermont	22 nm	Haswell	Haswell	Fully integrated voltage regulator				
Silvermont	Airmont	14 nm	Haswell	Broadwell					
Silvermont	Airmont	14 nm	Skylake	Skylake	DDR4 introduced on mainstream desktop				
Goldmont	Goldmont	14 nm	Skylake	Kaby Lake					
Goldmont	Goldmont	14 nm	Skylake	Coffee Lake	6 cores on mainstream desktop				
Goldmont	Goldmont	14 nm	Skylake	Amber Lake	Mobile-only				
Goldmont Plus	Goldmont Plus	14 nm	Skylake	Whiskey Lake	Mobile-only				
Goldmont Plus	Goldmont Plus	14 nm	Skylake	Coffee Lake Refresh	8 cores on mainstream desktop				
Goldmont Plus	Goldmont Plus	14 nm	Skylake	Comet Lake	10 cores on mainstream desktop				
Goldmont Plus	Goldmont Plus	14 nm	Sunny Cove	Cypress Cove (Rocket Lake)	Backported Sunny Cove microarchitecture for 14nm				
Tremont	Tremont	10 nm	Skylake	Palm Cove (Cannon Lake)	Mobile-only				
Tremont	Tremont	10 nm	Sunny Cove	Sunny Cove (Ice Lake)	512 KB L2-cache/core				
Tremont	Tremont	10 nm	Sunny Cove	Willow Cove (Tiger Lake)	X^{e} graphics engine				
Gracemont	Gracemont	Intel 7 (10nm ESF)	Golden Cove	Golden Cove (Alder Lake)	Hybrid, DDR5, PCIe 5.0				
Gracemont	Gracemont	Intel 7 (10nm ESF)	Golden Cove	Raptor Cove (Raptor Lake)					
Crestmont	Crestmont	Intel 4	Redwood Cove	Meteor Lake	Mobile-only; NPU, chiplet architecture				
Skymont	Skymont	TSMC N3B	Lion Cove	Lunar Lake	Low power mobile only (9-30W)				
Skymont	Skymont	TSMC N3B	Lion Cove	Arrow Lake					
Skymont	Skymont	Intel 3	Lion Cove	Arrow Lake-U					
Darkmont	Darkmont	Intel 18A	Cougar Cove	Panther Lake					
