= Tremont (microarchitecture) =

CPU microarchitecture

General information
- Product code: 80691 (Lakefield); 80697 (Jasper Lake)

Physical specifications
- Cores: 4–24

Architecture and classification
- Technology node: 10 nm
- Instruction set: x86-16, IA-32, x86-64
- Extensions: MMX, SSE, SSE2, SSE3, SSSE3, SSE4.1, SSE4.2; AES-NI, RDRAND, CLMUL, SHA; VT-x, VT-d

Products, models, variants
- Model: Pentium; Celeron; Atom

History
- Predecessor: Goldmont Plus
- Successor: Gracemont

Tremont is a microarchitecture for low-power Atom, Celeron and Pentium Silver branded processors used in systems on a chip (SoCs) made by Intel. It is the successor to Goldmont Plus. Intel launched Elkhart Lake platform with 10 nm Tremont core on September 23, 2020. Intel launched Jasper Lake platform with 10 nm Tremont core on January 11, 2021.

== Design ==
Tremont is the third generation out-of-order low-power Atom microarchitecture designed for entry-level desktop and notebook computers. Tremont is built on the 10 nm manufacturing process and supports up to 24 cores. It includes the Intel Gen11 graphics architecture from Ice Lake.

Tremont microarchitecture provides the following enhancements over Goldmont Plus:

- Enhanced branch-prediction unit.
  - Increased capacity with improved path-based conditional and indirect prediction.
  - New committed return stack buffer.
- Novel clustered 6-wide out-of-order front-end fetch and decode pipeline.
  - Banked ICache with dual 16B reads.
  - Two 3-wide decode clusters enabling up to 6 instructions per cycle.
- Deeper back-end out-of-order windows.
- 32 KB (Note: Transistorized memory, such as RAM, ROM, flash and cache sizes as well as file sizes are specified using binary meanings for K (1024^{1}), M (1024^{2}), G (1024^{3}), etc.) data cache.
- Larger load and store buffers.
- Dual generic load and store execution pipes capable of 2 loads, 2 stores, or 1 load and 1 store per cycle.
- Dedicated integer and vector integer/floating point store data ports.
- New and improved cryptography.
  - New Galois-field instructions (GFNI).
  - Dual AES units.
  - Enhanced SHA-NI implementation.
  - Faster PCLMULQDQ.
- Support for user level low-power and low-latency spin-loop instructions UMWAIT/UMONITOR and TPAUSE.

== Technology ==
- 10 nm manufacturing process
- SoC (System on a chip) architecture
- 3D tri-gate transistor
- 32 KB L1 data cache, up from 24 KB in Goldmont Plus
- 1.5–4.5 MB shared L2 cache per 4-core cluster, up from 4 MB in Goldmont Plus
- 4 MB shared L3 cache
- Gen 11 GPU with DirectX 12, OpenGL 4.6, Vulkan 1.3, OpenGL ES 3.2 and OpenCL 3.0 support.
- 10 W thermal design power (TDP) desktop processors
- 6 W TDP mobile processors

== List of Tremont processors ==
=== Mobile processors (Jasper Lake) ===
List of mobile processors as follows:

| Target segment | Cores (threads) | Processor branding & model | | GPU model | | TDP | SDP | CPU clock rate | | Graphics clock rate | | L2 cache [MB] | L3 cache [MB] | Release date | Price (USD) |
| Target segment | Cores (threads) | Processor branding & model | | GPU model | | TDP | SDP | Base | Turbo | Normal | Turbo | L2 cache [MB] | L3 cache [MB] | Release date | Price (USD) |
|---|---|---|---|---|---|---|---|---|---|---|---|---|---|---|---|
| Mobile | 4 (4) | Pentium Silver | N6005 | UHD Graphics | 32 EU | 10 W | —N/a | 2.0 GHz | 3.3 GHz | 450 MHz | 900 MHz | 1.5 MB | 4 MB | Q1 2021 | |
| Mobile | 4 (4) | Pentium Silver | N6000 | UHD Graphics | 32 EU | 6 W | 4.8 W | 1.1 GHz | 3.3 GHz | 350 MHz | 850 MHz | 1.5 MB | 4 MB | Q1 2021 | |
| Mobile | 4 (4) | Celeron | N5105 | UHD Graphics | 24 EU | 10 W | —N/a | 2.0 GHz | 2.9 GHz | 450 MHz | 800 MHz | 1.5 MB | 4 MB | Q1 2021 | |
| Mobile | 4 (4) | Celeron | N5100 | UHD Graphics | 24 EU | 6 W | 4.8 W | 1.1 GHz | 2.8 GHz | 350 MHz | 800 MHz | 1.5 MB | 4 MB | Q1 2021 | |
| Mobile | 4 (4) | Celeron | N5095 | UHD Graphics | 16 EU | 15 W | —N/a | 2.0 GHz | 2.9 GHz | 450 MHz | 750 MHz | 1.5 MB | 4 MB | Q1 2021 | |
| Mobile | 2 (2) | Celeron | N4505 | UHD Graphics | 16 EU | 10 W | —N/a | 2.0 GHz | 2.9 GHz | 450 MHz | 750 MHz | 1.5 MB | 4 MB | Q1 2021 | |
| Mobile | 2 (2) | Celeron | N4500 | UHD Graphics | 16 EU | 6 W | 4.8 W | 1.1 GHz | 2.8 GHz | 350 MHz | 750 MHz | 1.5 MB | 4 MB | Q1 2021 | |

=== Mobile processors (Lakefield) ===
Pentacore Lakefield CPU consists of 1 "big" Sunny Cove core and 4 "little" Tremont cores. AVX support on Sunny Cove (still physically present) is disabled to match Tremont core.

| Target segment | Cores (threads) | Processor branding & model | | GPU model | | TDP | CPU clock rate | | Graphics clock rate | | L2 cache [MB] | Release date | Price (USD) |
| Target segment | Cores (threads) | Processor branding & model | | GPU model | | TDP | Base | Turbo | Normal | Turbo | L2 cache [MB] | Release date | Price (USD) |
|---|---|---|---|---|---|---|---|---|---|---|---|---|---|
| Mobile | 1+4 (5) | Core i5 | L16G7 | UHD Graphics | 64 EU | 7 W | 1.4 GHz | 3.0 GHz | 200 MHz | 500 MHz | 1.5 + 4 (L3) | Q2 2020 | $281 |
| Mobile | 1+4 (5) | Core i3 | L13G4 | UHD Graphics | 48 EU | 7 W | 0.8 GHz | 2.8 GHz | 200 MHz | 500 MHz | 1.5 + 4 (L3) | Q2 2020 | $281 |

=== Processors for base transceiver stations (Snow Ridge) ===
These processors are exclusively produced for cell phone radio manufacturers.

| Target segment | Cores (threads) | Processor branding & model | | TDP | CPU Clock rate | L2 cache [MB] | Release date | Price (USD) |
| Target segment | Cores (threads) | Processor branding & model | | TDP | Base | L2 cache [MB] | Release date | Price (USD) |
|---|---|---|---|---|---|---|---|---|
| Server | 24 (24) | Atom P | P5962B | Unknown | 2.2 GHz | 27 | Q1 2020 | Unknown |
| Server | 24 (24) | Atom P | P5362 | 83 W | 2.2 GHz | 27 | Q2 2022 | $708 |
| Server | 20 (20) | Atom P | P5752 | 74.5 W | 2.2 GHz | 22.5 | Q2 2022 | $763 |
| Server | 20 (20) | Atom P | P5352 | 78 W | 2.2 GHz | 22.5 | Q2 2022 | $654 |
| Server | 16 (16) | Atom P | P5742 | 67 W | 2.2 GHz | 18 | Q2 2022 | $752 |
| Server | 16 (16) | Atom P | P5342 | 71 W | 2.2 GHz | 18 | Q2 2022 | $632 |
| Server | 16 (16) | Atom P | P5942B | Unknown | 2.2 GHz | 18 | Q1 2020 | Unknown |
| Server | 12 (12) | Atom P | P5731 | 54.5 W | 2.2 GHz | 13.5 | Q2 2022 | $561 |
| Server | 12 (12) | Atom P | P5332 | 61 W | 2.2 GHz | 13.5 | Q2 2022 | $448 |
| Server | 12 (12) | Atom P | P5931B | Unknown | 2.2 GHz | 13.5 | Q1 2020 | Unknown |
| Server | 8 (8) | Atom P | P5721 | 48 W | 2.2 GHz | 9 | Q2 2022 | $392 |
| Server | 8 (8) | Atom P | P5322 | 55 W | 2.2 GHz | 9 | Q2 2022 | $352 |
| Server | 8 (8) | Atom P | P5921B | Unknown | 2.2 GHz | 9 | Q1 2020 | Unknown |

=== Embedded processors (Elkhart Lake) ===
List of embedded processors as follows:

| Target segment | Cores (threads) | Processor branding & model | | GPU model | | TDP | CPU clock rate | | Graphics clock rate | | L2 cache [MB] | Memory | Release date | Release price (USD) |
| Target segment | Cores (threads) | Processor branding & model | | GPU model | | TDP | Base | Turbo | Base | Turbo | L2 cache [MB] | Memory | Release date | Release price (USD) |
|---|---|---|---|---|---|---|---|---|---|---|---|---|---|---|
| Embedded | 4 (4) | Pentium | J6426 | UHD Graphics | 32 EU | 10 W | 1.8 GHz | 3.0 GHz | 400 MHz | 850 MHz | 1.5 MB | 4 × LPDDR4X-4267 2 × DDR4-3200 | Q1 2021 | |
| Embedded | 4 (4) | Pentium | N6415 | UHD Graphics | 16 EU | 6.5 W | 1.2 GHz | 3.0 GHz | 350 MHz | 800 MHz | 1.5 MB | 4 × LPDDR4X-4267 2 × DDR4-3200 | Q1 2021 | |
| Embedded | 4 (4) | Celeron | J6413 | UHD Graphics | 16 EU | 10 W | 1.8 GHz | 3.0 GHz | 400 MHz | 800 MHz | 1.5 MB | 4 × LPDDR4X-4267 2 × DDR4-3200 | Q1 2021 | |
| Embedded | 4 (4) | Celeron | J6412 | UHD Graphics | 16 EU | 10 W | 2.0 GHz | 2.6 GHz | 400 MHz | 800 MHz | 1.5 MB | 4 × LPDDR4X-4267 2 × DDR4-3200 | Q1 2021 | |
| Embedded | 2 (2) | Celeron | N6211 | UHD Graphics | 16 EU | 6.5 W | 1.2 GHz | 3.0 GHz | 250 MHz | 750 MHz | 1.5 MB | 4 × LPDDR4X-4267 2 × DDR4-3200 | Q1 2021 | |
| Embedded | 4 (4) | Atom | x6425RE | UHD Graphics | 32 EU | 12 W | 1.9 GHz | —N/a | 400 MHz | —N/a | 1.5 MB | 4 × LPDDR4X-4267 2 × DDR4-3200 | Q1 2021 | |
| Embedded | 4 (4) | Atom | x6427FE | UHD Graphics | 32 EU | 12 W | 1.9 GHz | —N/a | 400 MHz | —N/a | 1.5 MB | 4 × LPDDR4X-4267 2 × DDR4-3200 | Q1 2021 | |
| Embedded | 4 (4) | Atom | x6425E | UHD Graphics | 32 EU | 12 W | 1.8 GHz | 3.0 GHz | 500 MHz | 750 MHz | 1.5 MB | 4 × LPDDR4X-4267 2 × DDR4-3200 | Q1 2021 | |
| Embedded | 4 (4) | Atom | x6413E | UHD Graphics | 16 EU | 9 W | 1.5 GHz | 3.0 GHz | 500 MHz | 750 MHz | 1.5 MB | 4 × LPDDR4X-4267 2 × DDR4-3200 | Q1 2021 | |
| Embedded | 4 (4) | Atom | x6414RE | UHD Graphics | 16 EU | 9 W | 1.5 GHz | —N/a | 400 MHz | —N/a | 1.5 MB | 4 × LPDDR4X-4267 2 × DDR4-3200 | Q1 2021 | |
| Embedded | 4 (4) | Atom | x6416RE | UHD Graphics | 16 EU | 9 W | 1.7 GHz | —N/a | 450 MHz | —N/a | 1.5 MB | 4 × LPDDR4X-3200 2 × DDR4-3200 | Q1 2023 | |
| Embedded | 2 (2) | Atom | x6214RE | UHD Graphics | 16 EU | 6 W | 1.4 GHz | —N/a | 400 MHz | —N/a | 1.5 MB | 4 × LPDDR4X-3200 2 × DDR4-3200 | Q1 2023 | |
| Embedded | 2 (2) | Atom | x6212RE | UHD Graphics | 16 EU | 6 W | 1.2 GHz | —N/a | 350 MHz | —N/a | 1.5 MB | 4 × LPDDR4X-4267 2 × DDR4-3200 | Q1 2021 | |
| Embedded | 2 (2) | Atom | x6211E | UHD Graphics | 16 EU | 6 W | 1.2 GHz | 3.0 GHz | 350 MHz | 750 MHz | 1.5 MB | 4 × LPDDR4X-4267 2 × DDR4-3200 | Q1 2021 | |
| Embedded | 2 (2) | Atom | x6200FE | —N/a | | 4.5 W | 1.0 GHz | —N/a | | | 1 MB | 4 × LPDDR4X-4267 2 × DDR4-3200 | Q1 2021 | |

== See also ==
- List of Intel CPU microarchitectures
- List of Intel Pentium processors
- List of Intel Celeron processors
- List of Intel Atom processors
- Atom (system on chip)

== Notes ==
| Atom (ULV) | | Node name | Pentium/Core | | | | | | |
| Microarch. | Step | Node name | Microarch. | Step | | | | | |
| | | 600 nm | P6 | Pentium Pro (133 MHz) | | | | | |
| | | 500 nm | P6 | Pentium Pro (150 MHz) | | | | | |
| | | 350 nm | P6 | Pentium Pro (166–200 MHz) | | | | | |
| | | 350 nm | P6 | Klamath | | | | | |
| | | 250 nm | P6 | Deschutes | | | | | |
| | | 250 nm | P6 | Katmai | NetBurst | | | | |
| | | 180 nm | P6 | Coppermine | Willamette | | | | |
| | | 130 nm | P6 | Tualatin | Northwood | | | | |
| | | 130 nm | Pentium M | Banias | Northwood | | NetBurst(HT) | | NetBurst(×2) |
| | | 90 nm | Pentium M | Dothan | Prescott | ⇨ | Prescott‑2M | ⇨ | Smithfield |
| | | 90 nm | Pentium M | Dothan | ~~Tejas~~ | → | ⇩ | → | ~~Cedarmill (Tejas)~~ |
| | | 65 nm | Pentium M | Yonah | ~~Nehalem (NetBurst)~~ | | Cedar Mill | ⇨ | Presler |
| | | 65 nm | Core | Merom | 4 cores on mainstream desktop, DDR3 introduced | | | | |
| Bonnell | Bonnell | 45 nm | Core | Penryn | | | | | |
| Bonnell | Bonnell | 45 nm | Nehalem | Nehalem | HT reintroduced, integrated MC, PCH; L3-cache introduced, 256 KB L2-cache/core | | | | |
| Bonnell | Saltwell | 32 nm | Nehalem | Westmere | Introduced GPU on same package and AES-NI | | | | |
| Bonnell | Saltwell | 32 nm | Sandy Bridge | Sandy Bridge | On-die ring bus, no more non-UEFI motherboards | | | | |
| Silvermont | Silvermont | 22 nm | Sandy Bridge | Ivy Bridge | | | | | |
| Silvermont | Silvermont | 22 nm | Haswell | Haswell | Fully integrated voltage regulator | | | | |
| Silvermont | Airmont | 14 nm | Haswell | Broadwell | | | | | |
| Silvermont | Airmont | 14 nm | Skylake | Skylake | DDR4 introduced on mainstream desktop | | | | |
| Goldmont | | 14 nm | Skylake | Kaby Lake | | | | | |
| Goldmont | | 14 nm | Skylake | Coffee Lake | 6 cores on mainstream desktop | | | | |
| Goldmont | | 14 nm | Skylake | Amber Lake | Mobile-only | | | | |
| Goldmont Plus | | 14 nm | Skylake | Whiskey Lake | Mobile-only | | | | |
| Goldmont Plus | | 14 nm | Skylake | Coffee Lake Refresh | 8 cores on mainstream desktop | | | | |
| Goldmont Plus | | 14 nm | Skylake | Comet Lake | 10 cores on mainstream desktop | | | | |
| Goldmont Plus | | 14 nm | Sunny Cove | Cypress Cove (Rocket Lake) | Backported Sunny Cove microarchitecture for 14 nm | | | | |
| Tremont | | 10 nm | Skylake | Palm Cove (Cannon Lake) | Mobile-only | | | | |
| Tremont | | 10 nm | Sunny Cove | Sunny Cove (Ice Lake) | 512 KB L2-cache/core | | | | |
| Tremont | | 10 nm | Sunny Cove | Willow Cove (Tiger Lake) | X^{e} graphics engine | | | | |
| Gracemont | | Intel 7 (10 nm ESF) | Golden Cove | Golden Cove (Alder Lake) | Hybrid, DDR5, PCIe 5.0 | | | | |
| Gracemont | | Intel 7 (10 nm ESF) | Golden Cove | Raptor Cove (Raptor Lake) | | | | | |
| Crestmont | | Intel 4 | Redwood Cove | Meteor Lake | Mobile-only; NPU, chiplet architecture | | | | |
| Crestmont | | Intel 3 | Redwood Cove | Arrow Lake-U | | | | | |
| Skymont | | TSMC N3B | Lion Cove | Lunar Lake | Low power mobile only (9–30 W) | | | | |
| Skymont | | TSMC N3B | Lion Cove | Arrow Lake | | | | | |
| Darkmont | | Intel 18A | Cougar Cove | Panther Lake | | | | | |
| Arctic Wolf | | Intel 18A and/or TSMC N2P | Coyote Cove | Nova Lake | | | | | |
