= Intel =

American multinational technology company

Intel Corporation
- Intel logo used since 2020

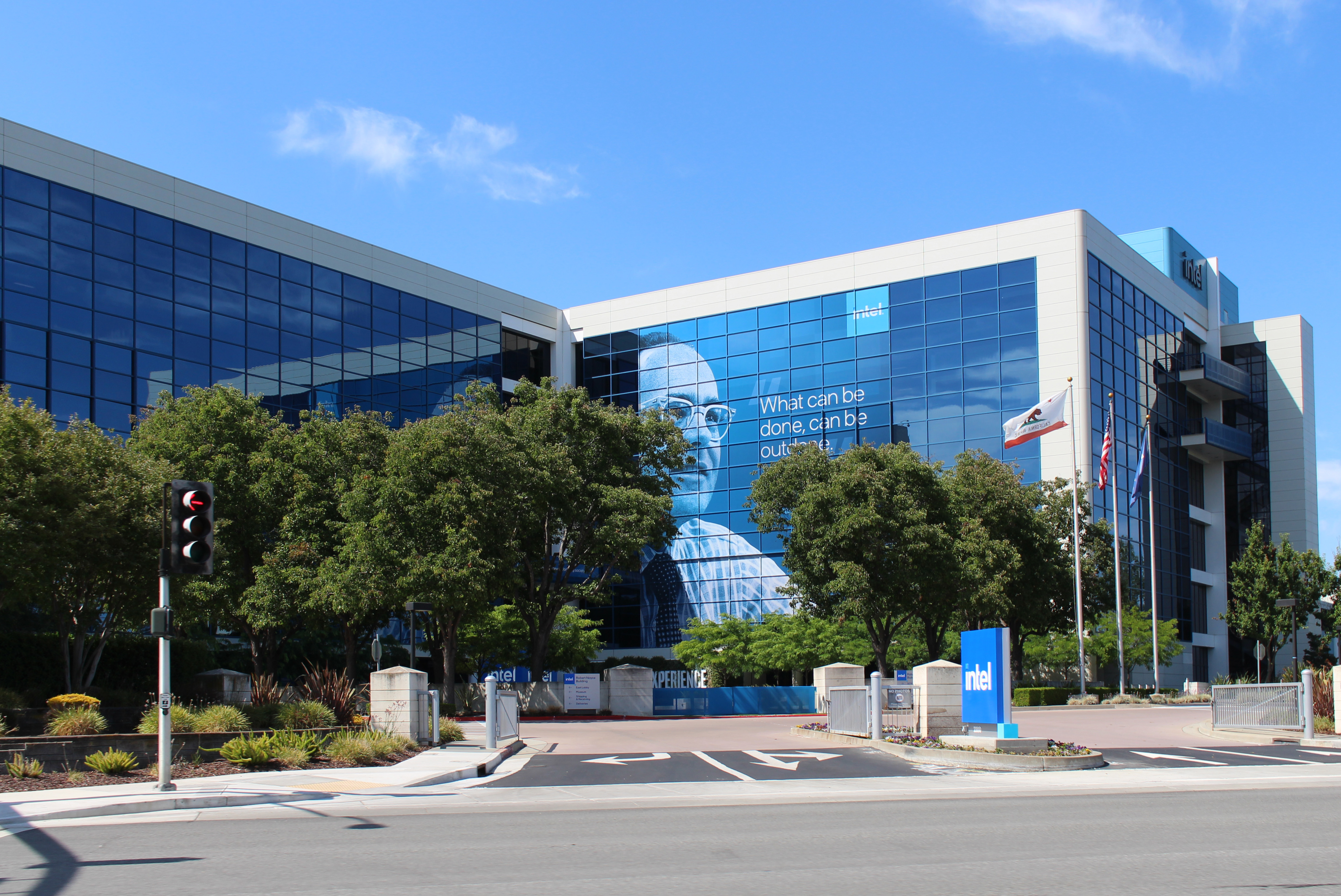
- Headquarters in Santa Clara, California, in 2023
- Trade name: Intel
- Formerly: NM Electronics (1968)
- Type: Public
- Traded as: Nasdaq: INTC; Nasdaq-100 component; S&P 100 component; S&P 500 component
- Industry: Semiconductors
- Founded: July 18, 1968; 58 years ago
- Founders: Robert Noyce; Gordon Moore
- Headquarters: Santa Clara, California, U.S. 37°23′16″N 121°57′49″W
- Area served: Worldwide
- Key people: Frank D. Yeary (chairman); Lip-Bu Tan (CEO); David Zinsner (CFO)
- Services: Semiconductor foundry services; Cloud software and services
- Revenue: ▼US$52.85 billion (2025)
- Operating income: ▲US$−2.21 billion (2025)
- Net income: ▲US$−267 million (2025)
- Total assets: ▲US$211.4 billion (2025)
- Total equity: ▲US$114.3 billion (2025)
- Owner: Federal government of the United States (9.9%); BlackRock (8.5%); Vanguard (5.7%); State Street (4.3%); Nvidia (4.3%); Invesco (3.1%); Geode Capital (2.2%); SoftBank (1.7%)
- Number of employees: 85,100 (2025)
- Subsidiaries: Mobileye (94.2%); Intel Ireland
- Website: intel.com

Intel Corporation is an American multinational technology company headquartered in Santa Clara, California. It designs, manufactures, and sells computer components such as central processing units (CPUs) and related products for business and consumer markets. Intel was the world's third-largest semiconductor chip manufacturer by revenue in 2024 and has been included in the Fortune 500 list of the largest United States corporations by revenue since 2007. It was one of the first companies listed on Nasdaq.

Intel supplies microprocessors for most manufacturers of computer systems, and is one of the two major developers of the x86 series of instruction sets found in most personal computers (PCs), alongside AMD. The company also manufactures chipsets, network interface controllers, flash memory, graphics processing units (GPUs), and other devices related to communications and computing. Intel is known for its Intel Core line of consumer-oriented CPUs and its Intel Xeon line of server and workstation CPUs, as well as its Intel Arc series of GPUs.

Intel was founded in 1968 by engineers Gordon Moore and Robert Noyce, along with investor Arthur Rock, and is associated with the executive leadership and vision of Andrew Grove. The company was a key component of the rise of Silicon Valley as a high-tech center, and was an early developer of static (SRAM) and dynamic random-access memory (DRAM) chips, which represented the majority of its business until 1981. Although Intel created the world's first commercial microprocessor chip—the Intel 4004—in 1971, it was not until the success of the PC in the early 1980s that microprocessors became its primary business.

During the 1990s, the partnership between Microsoft Windows and Intel—known as Wintel—shaped the PC landscape, solidifying Intel's position on the market. As a result, Intel invested heavily in new microprocessor designs in the mid-to-late 1990s, fostering the industry's rapid growth. During this period, it became the dominant supplier of CPUs, and was known for aggressive and anti-competitive tactics in defense of its position, as well as tensions with Microsoft over the direction of the PC industry. Although AMD has reduced Intel's market share in the 2000s and especially since the late 2010s, the company retained its dominance in the x86 market.

== History ==
=== Origins ===
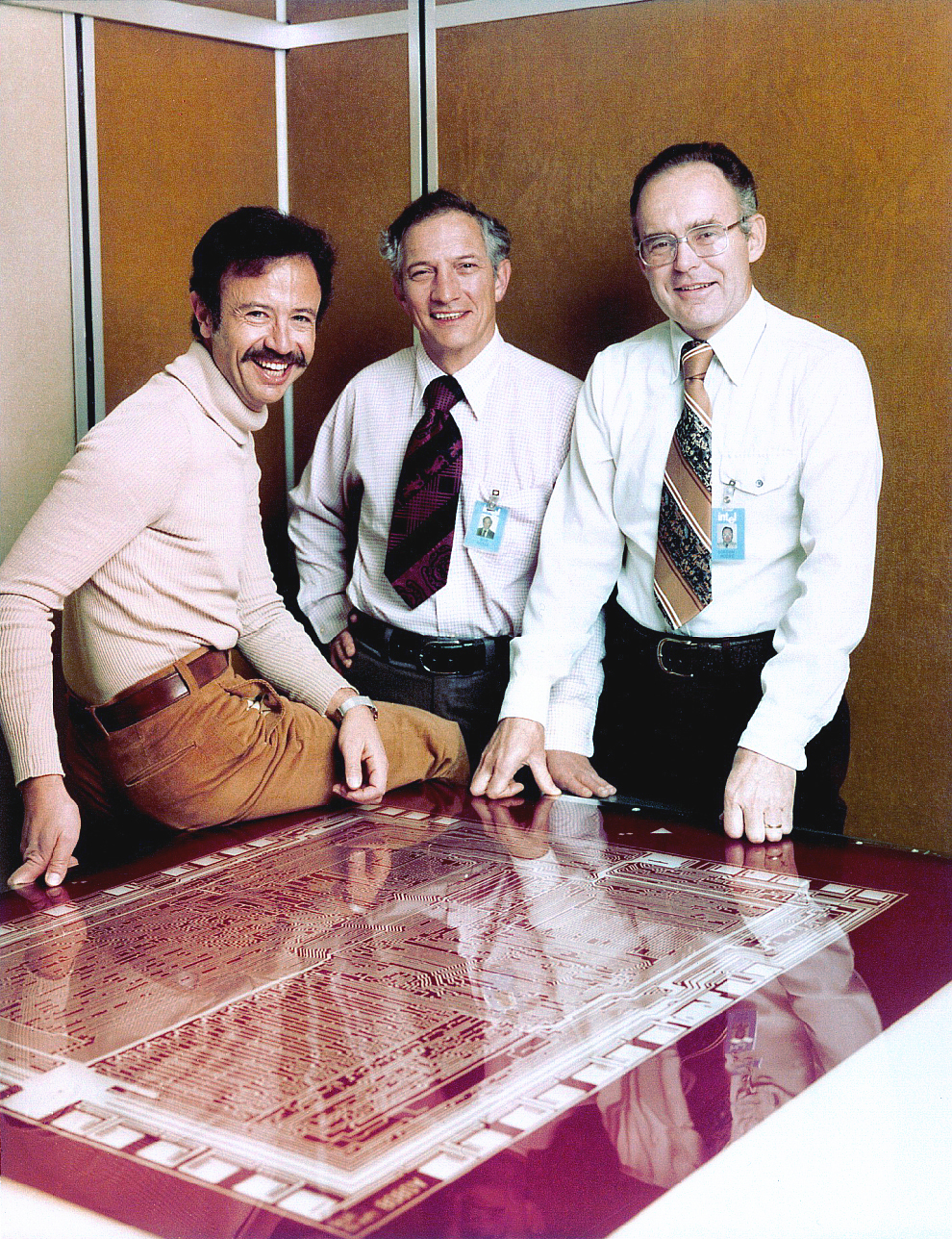
Intel founders Robert Noyce (middle) and Gordon Moore (right) along with Andy Grove, in 1978

Intel was incorporated in Mountain View, California, on July 18, 1968, by Gordon E. Moore, a chemist; Robert Noyce, a physicist and co-inventor of the integrated circuit; and Arthur Rock, an investor and venture capitalist. Moore and Noyce had left Fairchild Semiconductor, where they were part of the "traitorous eight" who founded it. There were originally 500,000 shares outstanding of which Noyce bought 245,000 shares, Moore 245,000 shares, and Rock 10,000 shares; all at $1 per share. Rock offered $2,500,000 of convertible debentures to a limited group of private investors (equivalent to $21 million in 2022), convertible at $5 per share. Two years later, Intel became a public company via an initial public offering (IPO), raising $6.8 million ($23.50 per share). Intel was one of the first companies—and the oldest—to be listed on the then-newly established National Association of Securities Dealers Automated Quotation System (NASDAQ). Intel's third employee was Andy Grove, a chemical engineer, who ran the company through much of the 1980s and the high-growth 1990s.

In deciding on a name, Moore and Noyce quickly rejected "Moore Noyce", a near-homophone for "more noise" – an ill-suited name for an electronics company, since noise in electronics is usually undesirable and typically associated with bad interference. Instead, they founded the company as NM Electronics on July 18, 1968, but by the end of the month had changed the name to Intel, which stood for Integrated Electronics. Since "Intel" was already trademarked by the hotel chain Intelco, it had to buy the rights for the name.

=== Early history ===
At its founding, Intel was distinguished by its ability to make logic circuits using semiconductor devices. The founders' goal was the semiconductor memory market, widely predicted to replace magnetic-core memory. Its first product, a quick entry into the small, high-speed memory market in 1969, was the 3101 Schottky TTL bipolar 64-bit static random-access memory (SRAM), which was nearly twice as fast as earlier Schottky diode implementations by Fairchild and the Electrotechnical Laboratory in Tsukuba, Japan. In the same year, Intel also produced the 3301 Schottky bipolar 1024-bit read-only memory (ROM) and the first commercial metal–oxide–semiconductor field-effect transistor (MOSFET) silicon gate SRAM chip, the 256-bit 1101.

While the 1101 was a significant advance, its complex static cell structure made it too slow and costly for mainframe computer memories. The three-transistor cell implemented in the first commercially available dynamic random-access memory (DRAM), the 1103 released in 1970, solved these issues. The 1103 was the bestselling semiconductor memory chip in the world by 1972, as it replaced core memory in many applications. Intel's business grew during the 1970s as it expanded and improved its manufacturing processes and produced a wider range of products, still dominated by various memory devices.

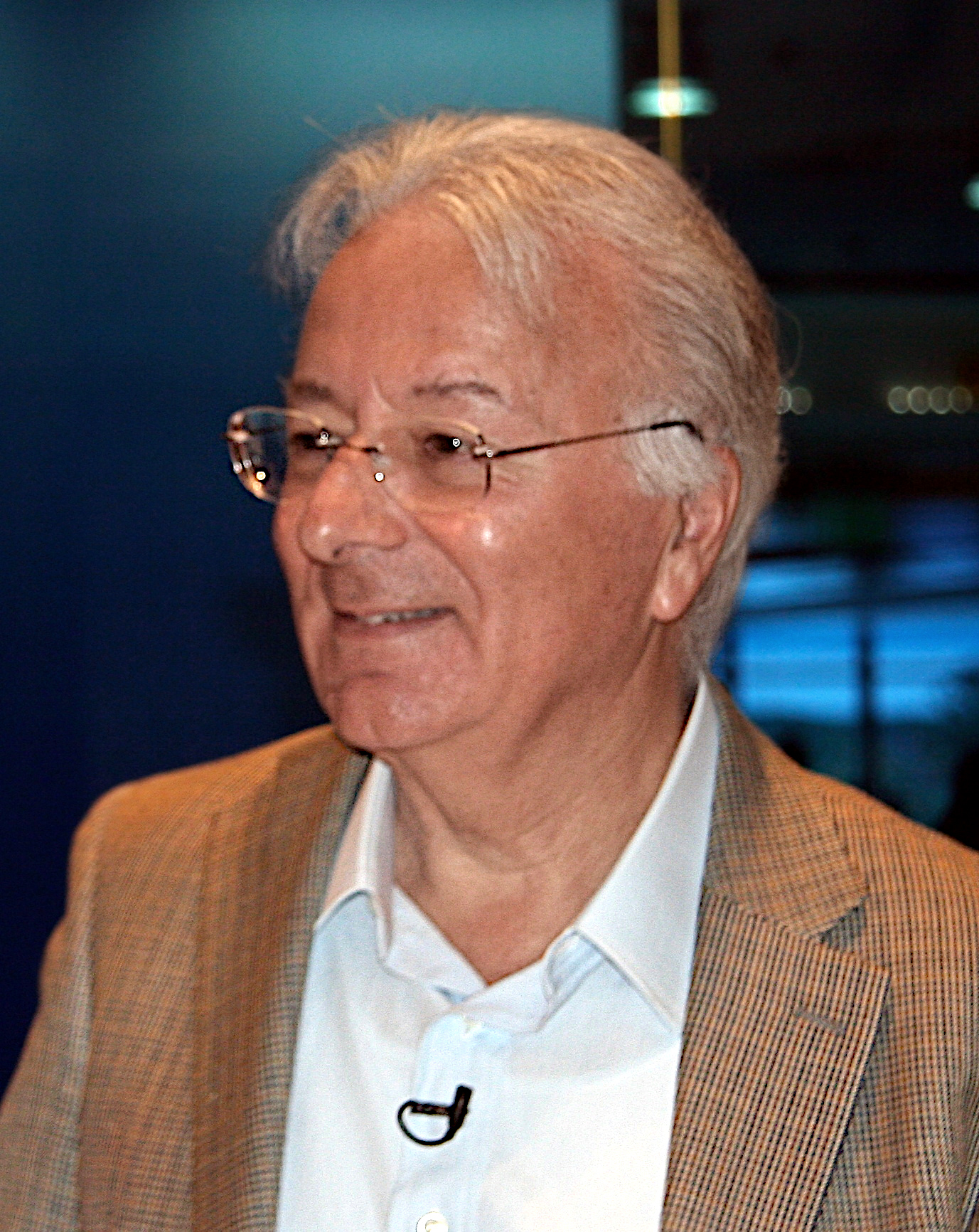
Federico Faggin, designer of the Intel 4004

Intel created the first commercially available microprocessor, the Intel 4004, in 1971. The microprocessor represented a notable advance in the technology of integrated circuitry, as it miniaturized the central processing unit of a computer, which then made it possible for small machines to perform calculations that in the past only very large machines could do. Considerable technological innovation was needed before the microprocessor could become the basis of what was first known as a "mini computer" and then a "personal computer". Subsequently, Intel would create one of the first microcomputers in 1973.

Intel opened its first international manufacturing facility in 1972, in Malaysia, which would host multiple Intel operations, before opening assembly facilities and semiconductor plants in Singapore and Jerusalem, Israel, in the early 1980s, and manufacturing and development centers in China, India, and Costa Rica in the 1990s. By the early 1980s, its business was dominated by DRAM chips. However, increased competition from Japanese semiconductor manufacturers had, by 1983, dramatically reduced the profitability of this market. The growing success of the IBM personal computer, based on an Intel microprocessor, was among factors that convinced Gordon Moore (CEO since 1975) to shift the company's focus to microprocessors and to change fundamental aspects of that business model. Moore's decision to sole-source Intel's model 80386 chip played into the company's continuing success.

By the end of the 1980s, buoyed by its position as microprocessor supplier to IBM and IBM's competitors within the rapidly growing personal computer market, Intel embarked on 10 years of unprecedented growth as the primary and most profitable hardware supplier to the PC industry, part of the winning "Wintel" combination of Intel CPUs running Microsoft Windows. This partnership would become instrumental in shaping the PC landscape, and solidified Intel's position on the market. Moore handed over his position as CEO to Andy Grove in 1987. By launching its Intel Inside marketing campaign in 1991, Intel was able to associate brand loyalty with consumer selection, so that by the end of the 1990s, its line of Pentium processors had become a household name.

During that period, it became the dominant supplier of PC microprocessors and was known for aggressive and anti-competitive tactics in defense of its market position, particularly against AMD, as well as a struggle with Microsoft for control over the direction of the PC industry. In addition, the company is considered a key component of the rise of Silicon Valley as a high-tech center between the 1970s and 2000s.

=== Challenges to dominance (2000s) ===
As Intel exited other markets, the company depended so much on the 80386 and its successors that a marketing employee said that "there's only one product, and Andy Grove's the product manager". After 2000, growth in demand for high-end microprocessors slowed. Competitors, most notably AMD (Intel's largest competitor in its primary x86 architecture market), garnered significant market share, initially in low-end and mid-range processors but ultimately across the product range. Intel's dominant position in its core market was greatly reduced, mostly due to the controversial NetBurst microarchitecture. In the early 2000s, then-CEO, Craig Barrett attempted to diversify the company's business beyond semiconductors, but few of these activities were ultimately successful.

==== Litigation ====
Intel was embroiled in litigation for several years. U.S. law did not initially recognize intellectual property rights related to microprocessor topology (circuit layouts), until the Semiconductor Chip Protection Act of 1984, a law sought by Intel and the Semiconductor Industry Association (SIA). During the late 1980s and 1990s (after this law was passed), Intel also sued companies that tried to develop competitor chips to the 80386 CPU. The lawsuits were noted to significantly burden the competition with legal bills, even if Intel lost the suits. Antitrust allegations had been simmering since the early 1990s and had been the cause of one lawsuit against Intel in 1991. In 2004 and 2005, AMD brought further claims against Intel related to unfair competition.

=== Reorganization and success with Intel Core (2005–2015) ===
In 2005, CEO Paul Otellini reorganized the company to refocus its core processor and chipset business on platforms (enterprise, digital home, digital health, and mobility).

On June 6, 2005, Steve Jobs, then CEO of Apple, announced that Apple would be using Intel's x86 processors for its Macintosh computers, switching from the PowerPC architecture developed by the AIM alliance. This was seen as a win for Intel; an analyst called the move "risky" and "foolish", as Intel's current offerings at the time were considered to be behind those of AMD and IBM.

In 2006, Intel unveiled its Core microarchitecture; the product range was perceived as an exceptional leap in processor performance that at a stroke regained much of its leadership of the field. In 2008, Intel had another advance when it introduced the Penryn microarchitecture, fabricated using the 45 nm process node. Later that year, Intel released a processor with the Nehalem architecture to positive reception.

On June 27, 2006, the sale of Intel's XScale assets was announced. Intel agreed to sell the XScale processor business to Marvell Technology Group for an estimated $600 million and the assumption of unspecified liabilities. The move was intended to permit Intel to focus its resources on its core x86 and server businesses, and the acquisition completed on November 9, 2006.

In 2008, Intel spun off key assets of a solar startup business effort to form an independent company, SpectraWatt Incorporated. In 2011, SpectraWatt filed for bankruptcy.

In February 2011, Intel began to build a new microprocessor manufacturing facility in Chandler, Arizona, completed in 2013 at a cost of $5 billion. The building is now the 10 nm-certified Fab 42 and is connected to the other Fabs (12, 22, 32) on Ocotillo Campus via an enclosed bridge known as the Link. The company produces three-quarters of its products in the United States, although three-quarters of its revenue come from overseas.

The Alliance for Affordable Internet (A4AI) was launched in October 2013. Intel is part of the coalition of public and private organizations that includes Facebook, Google, and Microsoft. Led by Tim Berners-Lee, the A4AI sought to make Internet access more affordable to broaden access in the developing world, where only 31% of people were online. Google would help lower Internet access prices to below the UN Broadband Commission's worldwide target of 5% of monthly income.

==== Attempts at entering the smartphone market ====
In April 2011, Intel began a pilot project with ZTE Corporation to produce smartphones using the Intel Atom processor for China's domestic market. In December 2011, Intel announced that it reorganized several of its business units into a new mobile and communications group that would be responsible for the company's smartphone, tablet, and wireless efforts. Intel planned to introduce Medfield – a processor for tablets and smartphones – to the market in 2012, as an effort to compete with Arm. As a 32-nanometer processor, Medfield is designed to be energy-efficient, one of Arm's chips' core features.

Intel's partnership with Google was announced at the Intel Developers Forum (IDF) 2011 in San Francisco, California. In January 2012, Google announced Android 2.3, supporting Intel's Atom microprocessor. In 2013, Intel's Kirk Skaugen said that Intel's exclusive focus on Microsoft platforms was a thing of the past and that it would now support all "tier-one operating systems" such as Linux, Android, iOS, and ChromeOS.

In 2014, Intel dismissed thousands of employees in response to "evolving market trends", and offered to subsidize manufacturers for the extra costs involved in using Intel chips in their tablets. In April 2016, Intel cancelled the SoFIA platform and the Broxton Atom SoC for smartphones, effectively leaving the smartphone market.

==== Intel custom foundry ====
Finding itself with excess fab capacity after the failure of the Ultrabook to gain market traction and with PC sales declining, in 2013 Intel reached a foundry agreement to produce chips for Altera using a 14 nm process. General Manager of Intel's custom foundry division Sunit Rikhi indicated that Intel would pursue further such deals in the future. This was after poor sales of Windows 8 hardware caused a major retrenchment for most of the major semiconductor manufacturers, except for Qualcomm, which continued to see healthy purchases from its largest customer, Apple.

As of July 2013, five companies were using Intel's fabs via the Intel Custom Foundry division: Achronix, Tabula, Netronome, Microsemi, and Panasonic – most are field-programmable gate array (FPGA) makers, but Netronome designs network processors. Only Achronix began shipping chips made by Intel using the 22 nm Tri-Gate process. Several other customers also exist but were not announced at the time.

The foundry business was closed in 2018 due to Intel's issues with its manufacturing.

=== Security and manufacturing challenges (2016–2021) ===
Intel continued its Tick–tock model of a microarchitecture change followed by a die shrink until the 6th-generation Core family based on the Skylake microarchitecture. This model was deprecated in 2016, with the release of the 7th-generation Core family (codenamed Kaby Lake), ushering in the process–architecture–optimization model. As Intel struggled to shrink its process node from 14 nm to 10 nm, processor development slowed and the company continued to use the Skylake microarchitecture until 2020, albeit with optimizations.

==== 10 nm process node issues ====
While Intel originally planned to introduce 10 nm products in 2016, it later became apparent that there were manufacturing issues with the node. The first microprocessor under that node, Cannon Lake (marketed as 8th-generation Core), was released in small quantities in 2018. The company first delayed the mass production of its 10 nm products to 2017. They later delayed mass production to 2018, and then to 2019. Despite rumors of the process being cancelled, Intel finally introduced mass-produced 10 nm 10th-generation Intel Core mobile processors (codenamed "Ice Lake") in September 2019.

Intel later acknowledged that the strategy to shrink to 10 nm was too aggressive. While other foundries used up to four steps in 10 nm or 7 nm processes, the company's 10 nm process required up to five or six multi-pattern steps. In addition, Intel's 10 nm process is more dense than its counterpart processes from other foundries. Since Intel's microarchitecture and process node development were coupled, processor development stagnated.

==== Security flaws ====
Transient execution CPU vulnerabilities are vulnerabilities in which instructions, most often optimized using speculative execution, are executed temporarily by a microprocessor, without committing their results due to a misprediction or error, resulting in leaking secret data to an unauthorized party. The archetype is Spectre, and transient execution attacks like Spectre belong to the cache-attack category, one of several categories of side-channel attacks. Since January 2018 many different cache-attack vulnerabilities have been identified.

In early January 2018, it was reported that all Intel processors made since 1995 (besides Intel Itanium and pre-2013 Intel Atom) had been subject to two security flaws dubbed Meltdown and Spectre.

=== Renewed competition and other developments (2018–present) ===
Due to Intel's issues with its 10 nm process node and the company's slow processor development, the company now found itself in a market with intense competition. The company's main competitor, AMD, introduced the Zen microarchitecture and a new chiplet-based design to critical acclaim. Since its introduction, AMD, once unable to compete with Intel in the high-end CPU market, has undergone a resurgence, and Intel's dominance and market share have considerably decreased. In addition, Apple began to transition away from the x86 architecture and Intel processors to its own Apple silicon for its Macintosh computers in 2020. The transition is expected to affect Intel minimally; however, it might prompt other PC manufacturers to reevaluate their reliance on Intel and the x86 architecture.

==== 'IDM 2.0' strategy ====
On March 23, 2021, chief executive officer (CEO) Pat Gelsinger laid out new plans for the company. These include a new strategy, called IDM 2.0, that includes investments in manufacturing facilities, use of both internal and external foundries, and a new foundry business called Intel Foundry Services (IFS), a standalone business unit. Unlike Intel Custom Foundry, IFS will offer a combination of packaging and process technology, and Intel's intellectual property portfolio including x86 cores. Other plans for the company include a partnership with IBM and a new event for developers and engineers, called "Intel ON". Gelsinger also confirmed that Intel's 7 nm process was on track, and that the first products using their 7 nm process (also known as Intel 4) are Ponte Vecchio and Meteor Lake.

In January 2022, Intel selected New Albany, Ohio, near Columbus, Ohio, as the site for a major new manufacturing facility. The facility will cost at least $20 billion. The company expected the facility to begin producing chips by 2025. The same year Intel also chose Magdeburg, Germany, as a site for two new chip mega factories for €17 billion (topping Tesla's Gigafactory Berlin-Brandenburg manufacturing plant investment in Brandenburg, Germany). The start of the construction was initially planned for 2023, but this was postponed to late 2024, while the production start was scheduled for 2027. Including subcontractors, this was expected to create 10,000 new jobs.

In August 2022, Intel signed a $30 billion partnership with Brookfield Asset Management to fund its then-recent factory expansions. As part of the deal, Intel would have a controlling stake by funding 51% of the cost of building new chip-making facilities in Chandler. Brookfield owns the remaining 49% stake, allowing the companies to split the revenue from those facilities.

On January 31, 2023, as part of $3 billion in cost reductions, Intel announced pay cuts affecting employees above midlevel, ranging from 5% upwards. It also suspended bonuses and merit pay increases, reducing retirement plan matching. These cost reductions followed layoffs announced in the fall of 2022.

In October 2023, Intel confirmed it would be the first commercial user of high-NA extreme ultraviolet lithography tools, as part of its plan to regain process leadership from Taiwan Semiconductor Manufacturing Company (TSMC).

In December 2023, Intel unveiled Gaudi3, an artificial intelligence (AI) chip for generative AI software which launched in 2024 and competes with rival chips from Nvidia and AMD. On June 4, 2024, Intel announced AI chips for data centers, the Xeon 6 processor, aiming for better performance and power efficiency compared to its predecessor. Intel's Gaudi 2 and Gaudi 3 AI accelerators were revealed to be more cost-effective than competitors' offerings. Additionally, Intel disclosed architecture details for its Lunar Lake processors for AI PCs, which were released on September 24, 2024.

In August 2024, after posting $1.6 billion in losses for Q2, Intel announced that it would cut 15,000 jobs to save $10 billion in 2025. In order to reach this goal, the company would offer early retirement and voluntary departure options.

On November 1, 2024, it was announced that Intel would drop out of the Dow Jones Industrial Average on November 8 prior to the stock market open, with Nvidia taking its place.

In July 2025, Intel confirmed that it would let go of nearly 24,000 employees—about 15% of its workforce—by the end of 2025 as part of a wider restructuring plan. Intel also announced plans to scrap tens of billions of dollars of planned investments in new chip facilities in Europe.

In September 2025, Nvidia invested $5 billion in Intel as part of a partnership to jointly develop data-center and personal-computing CPUs. The move will allow Nvidia to offer its powerful servers—the GB300 based on Blackwell GPUs—to customers using Intel's X86 architecture.

In October 2025, Intel commenced talks to add rival AMD to its foundry customers.

In April 2026, Intel announced a $14.2 billion agreement to repurchase the 49% equity interest in its facility in Ireland from Apollo Global Management, reclaiming full ownership of the site as part of a broader stabilization of its capital structure.

In May 2026, Intel's investment in SambaNova Systems received clearance from U.S. antitrust authorities, removing a key regulatory hurdle for the deal.

In July 2026, Intel announced a $5.7 billion investment to expand its manufacturing campus in Leixlip, Ireland. The investment is intended to increase production capacity for AI and high-performance computing chips, expand research and development, connect existing manufacturing facilities, and retrain employees. Intel said the project is expected to create several hundred permanent jobs and be substantially completed by the end of 2027.

==== CEO replacement ====
In December 2024, Intel's CEO Pat Gelsinger was ousted amid ongoing struggles to revitalize the company, which declined in stock value during his tenure. Gelsinger's resignation, effective December 1, followed a board meeting where directors expressed dissatisfaction with the slow progress of his turnaround strategy. Despite efforts to enhance Intel's manufacturing capabilities and compete with rivals like AMD and Nvidia, the company faced mounting challenges, including a $16.6 billion loss and a 60% drop in share prices since Gelsinger's appointment in 2021. After his departure, Intel appointed David Zinsner and Michelle Johnston Holthaus interim co-CEOs while searching for a permanent successor. Gelsinger's exit underscored the turmoil at Intel as it grappled with its identity crisis and sought to regain its semiconductor industry position.

On March 13, 2025, Intel announced the appointment of Lip-Bu Tan as its new CEO, effective March 18, after four months of interim co-CEOs. Under Tan, Intel has engaged in a significant restructuring aimed at shrinking the company and refocusing on core businesses. In June, the company announced it would be closing its automotive chipmaking business and eliminating up to 20% of staff at its Hillsboro, Oregon foundry. In July, it was reported that Intel would be cutting 5,000 jobs across California, Oregon, Arizona, and Texas. It also spun off its artificial intelligence robotics and biometric company, RealSense as a separate entity. Intel's headcount in Israel also fell below 9,000 for the first time since 2012. The company's plan has ultimately called for 24,000 layoffs, axing plans to build a mega-fab, and assembly and testing facilities in Germany and Poland, and consolidating its assembly and test operations in Costa Rica into its Vietnam sites.

On August 7, 2025, United States president Donald Trump called for Tan's removal as CEO due to his China connections. Tan was CEO of Cadence Design Systems when it unlawfully sold its semiconductor design product to China between 2015 and 2021, and this drew criticism from Tom Cotton, a U.S. senator from Arkansas. The attention caused Intel shares to drop more than 3% during intra-day trading. Cadence pled guilty to the charges in 2025 and paid a fine of $140 million. In a letter to Intel employees, Tan said that he has "always operated within the highest legal and ethical standards". On August 11, 2025, Tan met with President Trump and U.S. Secretary of Commerce Howard Lutnick and U.S. Secretary of the Treasury Scott Bessent at the White House. Following the meeting, President Trump wrote in a Truth Social post that "the meeting was interesting" and Tan's "success and rise is an amazing story".

=== U.S. government stake (2025) ===
In August 2025, the United States government purchased 433.3 million Intel shares at $20.47 per share, equivalent to a 9.9% stake. The investment was structured as a passive ownership with no board representation or governance rights, and included a five-year warrant to purchase up to an additional 5% stake if Intel's ownership of its foundry business falls below 51%. The U.S. government price of $20.47 per share was a discount to the $23 per share Softbank paid the prior week.

=== Competition from AMD in the server market ===
In 2024 and 2025, AMD made significant advances in the server CPU market, narrowing the gap with Intel. While some reports briefly indicated a near-equal market split, further investigation revealed that these initial figures were influenced by manipulated benchmark data and were corrected shortly thereafter. As of the third quarter of 2025, Intel retained a majority share of the server CPU market at 63.3%, with AMD at 36.5%. Intel has seen its market share slip from over 90% in 2020.

== Products and markets ==
=== SRAMs, DRAMs, and the microprocessor ===
Intel's first products were shift register memory and random-access memory integrated circuits, and Intel grew to be a leader in the fiercely competitive DRAM, SRAM, and ROM markets throughout the 1970s. Concurrently, Intel engineers Marcian Hoff, Federico Faggin, Stanley Mazor, and Masatoshi Shima invented Intel's first microprocessor. Originally developed for the Japanese company Busicom to replace a number of ASICs in a calculator already produced by Busicom, the Intel 4004 was introduced to the mass market on November 15, 1971, though the microprocessor did not become the core of Intel's business until the mid-1980s. (Note: Intel is usually given credit with Texas Instruments for the almost-simultaneous invention of the microprocessor.)

In 1983, at the dawn of the personal computer era, Intel's profits came under increased pressure from Japanese memory-chip manufacturers, and then-president Andy Grove focused the company on microprocessors. Grove described this transition in the book Only the Paranoid Survive. A key element of his plan was the notion, then considered radical, of becoming the single source for successors to the popular 8086 microprocessor.

Until then, the manufacture of complex integrated circuits was not reliable enough for customers to depend on a single supplier, but Grove began producing processors in three geographically distinct factories, and ceased licensing the chip designs to competitors such as AMD. When the PC industry boomed in the late 1980s and 1990s, Intel was one of the primary beneficiaries.

=== Early x86 processors and the IBM PC ===
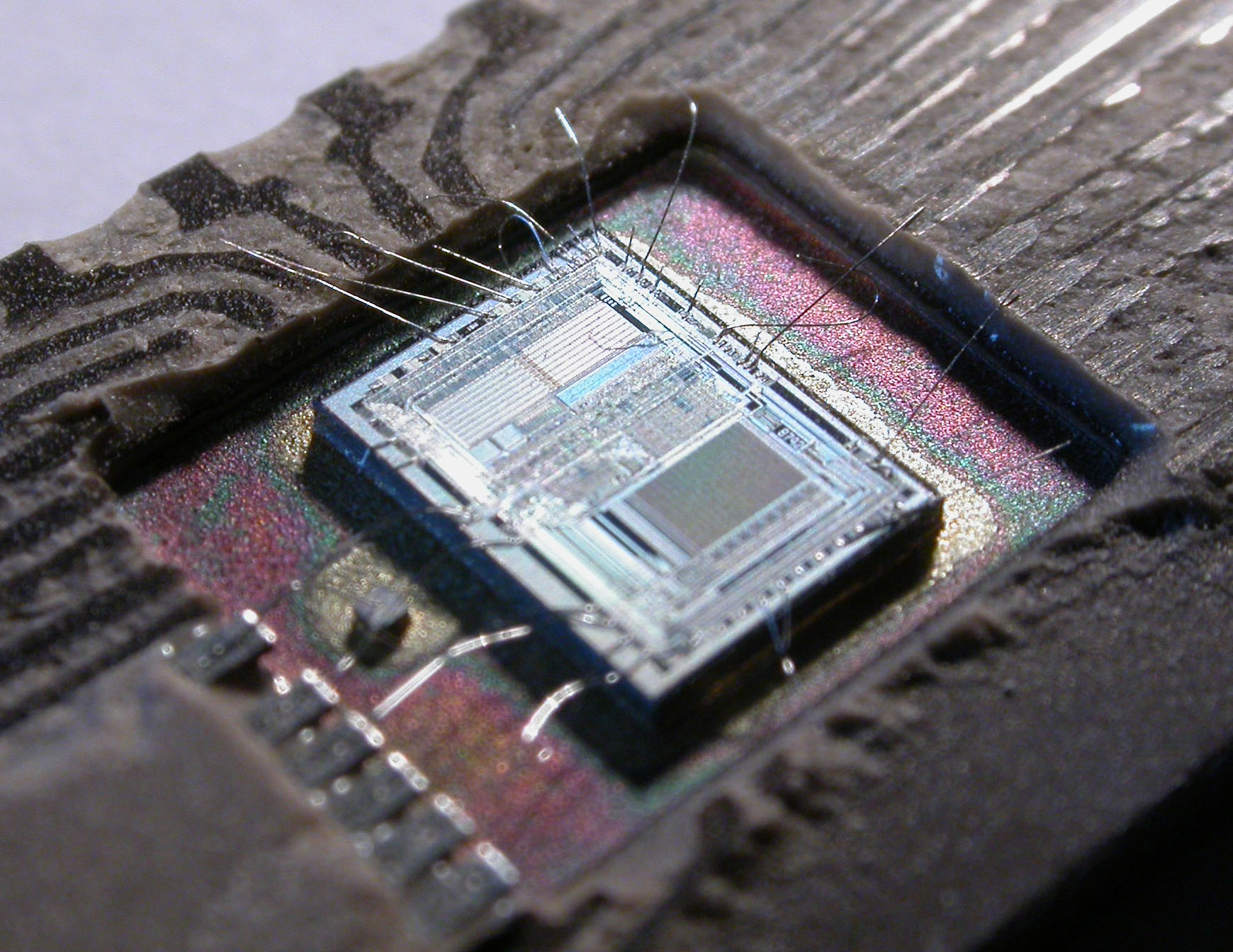
The die from an Intel 8742, an 8-bit microcontroller that includes a CPU running at 12 MHz, 128 bytes of RAM, 2048 bytes of EPROM, and I/O in the same chip

Despite the ultimate importance of the microprocessor, the 4004 and its successors the 8008 and the 8080 were never major revenue contributors at Intel.

In 1975, the company had started a project to develop a highly advanced 32-bit microprocessor, finally released in 1981 as the Intel iAPX 432. The project was too ambitious and the processor was never able to meet its performance objectives, and it failed in the marketplace. (Intel eventually extended the x86 architecture to 32 bits instead.)

As the next processor, the 8086 (and its variant the 8088) was completed in 1978, Intel embarked on a major marketing and sales campaign for that chip nicknamed "Operation Crush", and intended to win as many customers for the processor as possible. One design win was the newly created IBM PC division, though the importance of this was not fully realized at the time.

IBM introduced its personal computer in 1981, and it was rapidly successful. In 1982, Intel created the 80286 microprocessor, which, two years later, was used in the IBM PC/AT. Compaq, the first IBM PC "clone" manufacturer, produced a desktop system based on the faster 80286 processor in 1985 and in 1986 quickly followed with the first 80386-based system, beating IBM and establishing a competitive market for PC-compatible systems and setting up Intel as a key component supplier.

==== 386 microprocessor ====
During this period Andrew Grove dramatically redirected the company, closing much of its DRAM business and directing resources to the microprocessor business. Of perhaps greater importance was his decision to "single-source" the 386 microprocessor. Prior to this, microprocessor manufacturing was in its infancy, and manufacturing problems frequently reduced or stopped production, interrupting supplies to customers. To mitigate this risk, these customers typically insisted that multiple manufacturers (second sources) produce chips they could use to ensure a consistent supply. The 8080 and 8086-series microprocessors were produced by several companies, notably AMD, with which Intel had a technology-sharing contract.

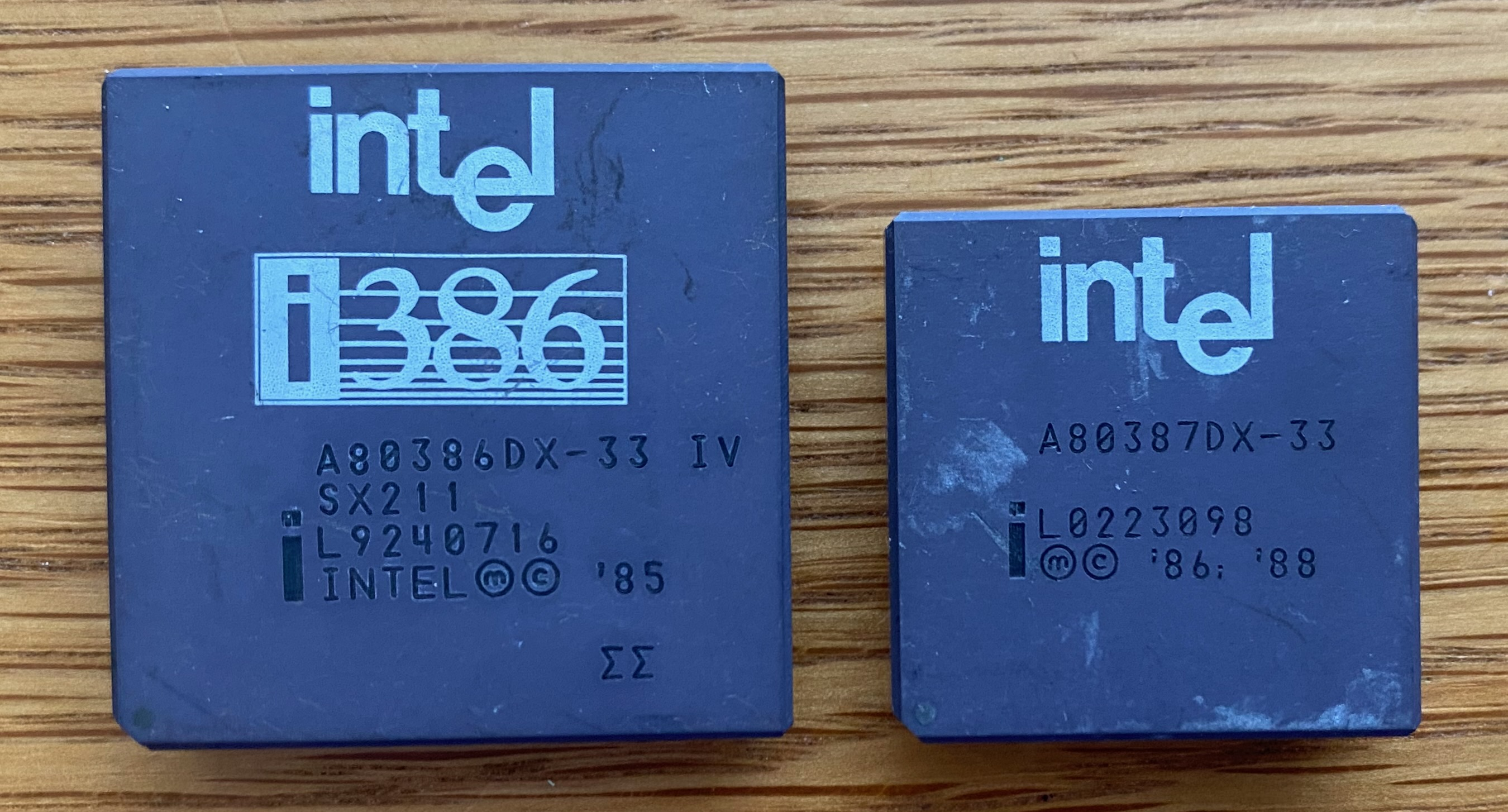
The 386 with the optional 387 co-processor

Grove made the decision not to license the 386 design to other manufacturers, instead, producing it in three geographically distinct factories: Santa Clara, California; Hillsboro, Oregon; and Chandler, a suburb of Phoenix, Arizona. He convinced customers that this would ensure consistent delivery. In doing this, Intel breached its contract with AMD, which sued and was paid millions of dollars in damages but could not manufacture new Intel CPU designs any longer. (Instead, AMD started to develop and manufacture its own competing x86 designs.)

As the success of Compaq's Deskpro 386 established the 386 as the dominant CPU choice, Intel achieved a position of near-exclusive dominance as its supplier. Profits from this funded rapid development of both higher-performance chip designs and higher-performance manufacturing capabilities, propelling Intel to a position of unquestioned leadership by the early 1990s.

==== 486, Pentium, and Itanium ====
Intel introduced the 486 microprocessor in 1989, and in 1990 established a second design team, designing the processors code-named "P5" and "P6" in parallel and committing to a major new processor every two years, versus the four or more years such designs had previously taken. The P5 project was earlier known as "Operation Bicycle", referring to the cycles of the processor through two parallel execution pipelines. The P5 was introduced in 1993 as the Intel Pentium, substituting a registered trademark name for the former part number. (Numbers, such as 486, cannot be legally registered as trademarks in the United States.) The P6 followed in 1995 as the Pentium Pro and improved into the Pentium II in 1997. New architectures were developed alternately in Santa Clara, California, and Hillsboro, Oregon.

The Santa Clara design team embarked in 1993 on a successor to the x86 architecture, codenamed "P7". The first attempt was dropped a year later but quickly revived in a cooperative program with Hewlett-Packard engineers, though Intel soon took over primary design responsibility. The resulting implementation of the IA-64 64-bit architecture was the Itanium, finally introduced in June 2001. The Itanium's performance running legacy x86 code did not meet expectations, and it failed to compete effectively with x86-64, which was AMD's 64-bit extension of the 32-bit x86 architecture (Intel uses the name Intel 64, previously EM64T). In 2017, Intel announced that the Itanium 9700 series (Kittson) would be the last Itanium chips produced.

The Hillsboro team designed the Willamette processors (initially code-named P68), which were marketed as the Pentium 4.

During this period, Intel undertook two major supporting advertising campaigns. The first campaign, the 1991 "Intel Inside" marketing and branding campaign, was widely known and became synonymous with Intel itself. The idea of "ingredient branding" was new at the time, with only NutraSweet and a few others making attempts to do so. One of the key architects of the marketing team was the head of the microprocessor division, David House who coined the slogan "Intel Inside". This campaign established Intel, which had been a component supplier little-known outside the PC industry, as a household name.

The second campaign, Intel's Systems Group, which began in the early 1990s, showcased manufacturing of PC motherboards, the main board component of a personal computer, and the one into which the processor (CPU) and memory (RAM) chips are plugged. The Systems Group campaign was lesser known than the Intel Inside campaign.

Shortly after, Intel began manufacturing fully configured "white box" systems for the dozens of PC clone companies that rapidly sprang up. At its peak in the mid-1990s, Intel manufactured over 15% of all PCs, making it the third-largest supplier at the time.

During the 1990s, Intel Architecture Labs (IAL) was responsible for many of the hardware innovations for the PC, including the PCI Bus, the PCI Express (PCIe) bus, and Universal Serial Bus (USB). IAL's software efforts met with a more mixed fate; its video and graphics software was important in the development of software digital video, but later its efforts were largely overshadowed by competition from Microsoft. The competition between Intel and Microsoft was revealed in testimony by then IAL Vice-president Steven McGeady at the Microsoft antitrust trial (United States v. Microsoft Corp.).

==== Pentium flaw ====
In June 1994, Intel engineers discovered a flaw in the floating-point math subsection of the P5 Pentium microprocessor. Under certain data-dependent conditions, the low-order bits of the result of a floating-point division would be incorrect. The error could compound in subsequent calculations. Intel corrected the error in a future chip revision, and under public pressure it issued a total recall and replaced the defective Pentium CPUs (which were limited to some 60, 66, 75, 90, and 100 MHz models) on customer request.

The bug was discovered independently in October 1994 by Thomas Nicely, Professor of Mathematics at Lynchburg College. He contacted Intel but received no response. On October 30, he posted a message about his finding on the Internet. Word of the bug spread quickly and reached the industry press. The bug was easy to replicate; a user could enter specific numbers into the calculator on the operating system. Consequently, many users did not accept Intel's statements that the error was minor and "not even an erratum". During Thanksgiving, in 1994, The New York Times ran a piece by journalist John Markoff spotlighting the error. Intel changed its position and offered to replace every chip, quickly putting in place a large end-user support organization. This resulted in a $475 million charge against Intel's 1994 revenue. Nicely later learned that Intel had discovered the FDIV bug in its own testing a few months before him (but had decided not to inform customers).

The "Pentium flaw" incident, Intel's response to it, and the surrounding media coverage propelled Intel from being a technology supplier generally unknown to most computer users to a household name. Dovetailing with an uptick in the "Intel Inside" campaign, the episode is considered to have been a positive event for Intel, changing some of its business practices to be more end-user focused and generating substantial public awareness, while avoiding a lasting negative impression.

=== Intel Core ===
The Intel Core line originated from the original Core brand, with the release of the 32-bit Yonah CPU, Intel's first dual-core mobile (low-power) processor. Derived from the Pentium M, the processor family used an enhanced version of the P6 microarchitecture. Its successor, the Core 2 family, was released on July 27, 2006. This was based on the Intel Core microarchitecture, and was a 64-bit design. Instead of focusing on higher clock rates, the Core microarchitecture emphasized power efficiency and a return to lower clock speeds. It also provided more efficient decoding stages, execution units, caches, and buses, reducing the power consumption of Core 2-branded CPUs while increasing their processing capacity.

In November 2008, Intel released the 1st-generation Core processors based on the Nehalem microarchitecture. Intel also introduced a new naming scheme, with the three variants now named Core i3, i5, and i7 (as well as i9 from the 7th generation onwards). Unlike the previous naming scheme, these names no longer corresponded to specific technical features. It was succeeded by the Westmere microarchitecture in 2010, with a die shrink to 32 nm and included Intel HD Graphics.

In 2011, Intel released the Sandy Bridge-based 2nd-generation Core processor family. This generation featured an 11% performance increase over Nehalem. It was succeeded by Ivy Bridge-based 3rd-generation Core, introduced at the 2012 Intel Developer Forum. Ivy Bridge featured a die shrink to 22 nm, and supported both DDR3 memory and DDR3L chips.

Intel continued its tick-tock model of a microarchitecture change followed by a die shrink until the 6th-generation Core family based on the Skylake microarchitecture. This model was deprecated in 2016, with the release of the 7th-generation Core family based on Kaby Lake, ushering in the process–architecture–optimization model. From 2016 until 2021, Intel later released more optimizations on the Skylake microarchitecture with Kaby Lake R, Amber Lake, Whiskey Lake, Coffee Lake, Coffee Lake R, and Comet Lake. Intel struggled to shrink its process node from 14 nm to 10 nm, with the first microarchitecture under that node, Cannon Lake (marketed as 8th-generation Core), only being released in small quantities in 2018.

In 2019, Intel released the 10th-generation of Core processors, codenamed "Amber Lake", "Comet Lake", and "Ice Lake". Ice Lake, based on the Sunny Cove microarchitecture, was produced on the 10 nm process and was limited to low-power mobile processors. Both Amber Lake and Comet Lake were based on a refined 14 nm node, with the latter being used for desktop and high-performance mobile products and the former used for low-power mobile products.

In September 2020, 11th-generation Core mobile processors, codenamed Tiger Lake, were launched. Tiger Lake was based on the Willow Cove microarchitecture and a refined 10 nm node. Intel later released 11th-generation Core desktop processors (codenamed "Rocket Lake"), fabricated using Intel's 14 nm process and based on the Cypress Cove microarchitecture, on March 30, 2021. It replaced Comet Lake desktop processors. All 11th-generation Core processors featured new integrated graphics based on the Intel Xe microarchitecture.

Both desktop and mobile products were unified under a single process node with the release of 12th-generation Intel Core processors (codenamed "Alder Lake") in late 2021. This generation was fabricated using Intel's 10 nm process, called Intel 7, for both desktop and mobile processors, and was based on a hybrid architecture using high-performance Golden Cove cores and high-efficiency Gracemont (Atom) cores.

==== Transient execution CPU vulnerability ====
Transient execution CPU vulnerabilities are vulnerabilities in which instructions, most often optimized using speculative execution, are executed temporarily by a microprocessor, without committing their results due to a misprediction or error, resulting in leaking secret data to an unauthorized party. The archetype is Spectre, and transient execution attacks like Spectre belong to the cache-attack category, one of several categories of side-channel attacks. Since January 2018 many different cache-attack vulnerabilities have been identified.

=== Use of Intel products by Apple (2005–2019) ===
On June 6, 2005, Steve Jobs, then CEO of Apple, announced that Apple would be transitioning the Macintosh from its long favored PowerPC architecture to the Intel x86 architecture because the future PowerPC road map was unable to satisfy Apple's needs. This was seen as a win for Intel, although an analyst called the move "risky" and "foolish", as Intel's current offerings at the time were considered to be behind those of AMD and IBM. The first Mac computers containing Intel CPUs were announced on January 10, 2006, and Apple had its entire line of consumer Macs running on Intel processors by early August 2006. The Apple Xserve server was updated to Intel Xeon processors from November 2006 and was offered in a configuration similar to Apple's Mac Pro.

Despite Apple's use of Intel products, relations between the two companies were strained at times. Rumors of Apple switching from Intel processors to its own designs began circulating as early as 2011. On June 22, 2020, during Apple's annual WWDC, Tim Cook, Apple's CEO, announced that it would be transitioning the company's entire Mac line from Intel CPUs to custom Apple-designed processors based on the ARM architecture over the course of the next two years. In the short term, this transition was estimated to have minimal effects on Intel, as Apple only accounted for 2% to 4% of its revenue. However, at the time it was believed that Apple's shift to its own chips might prompt other PC manufacturers to reassess their reliance on Intel and the x86 architecture. By November 2020, Apple unveiled the M1, its processor custom-designed for the Mac.

=== Solid-state drives (SSDs) ===
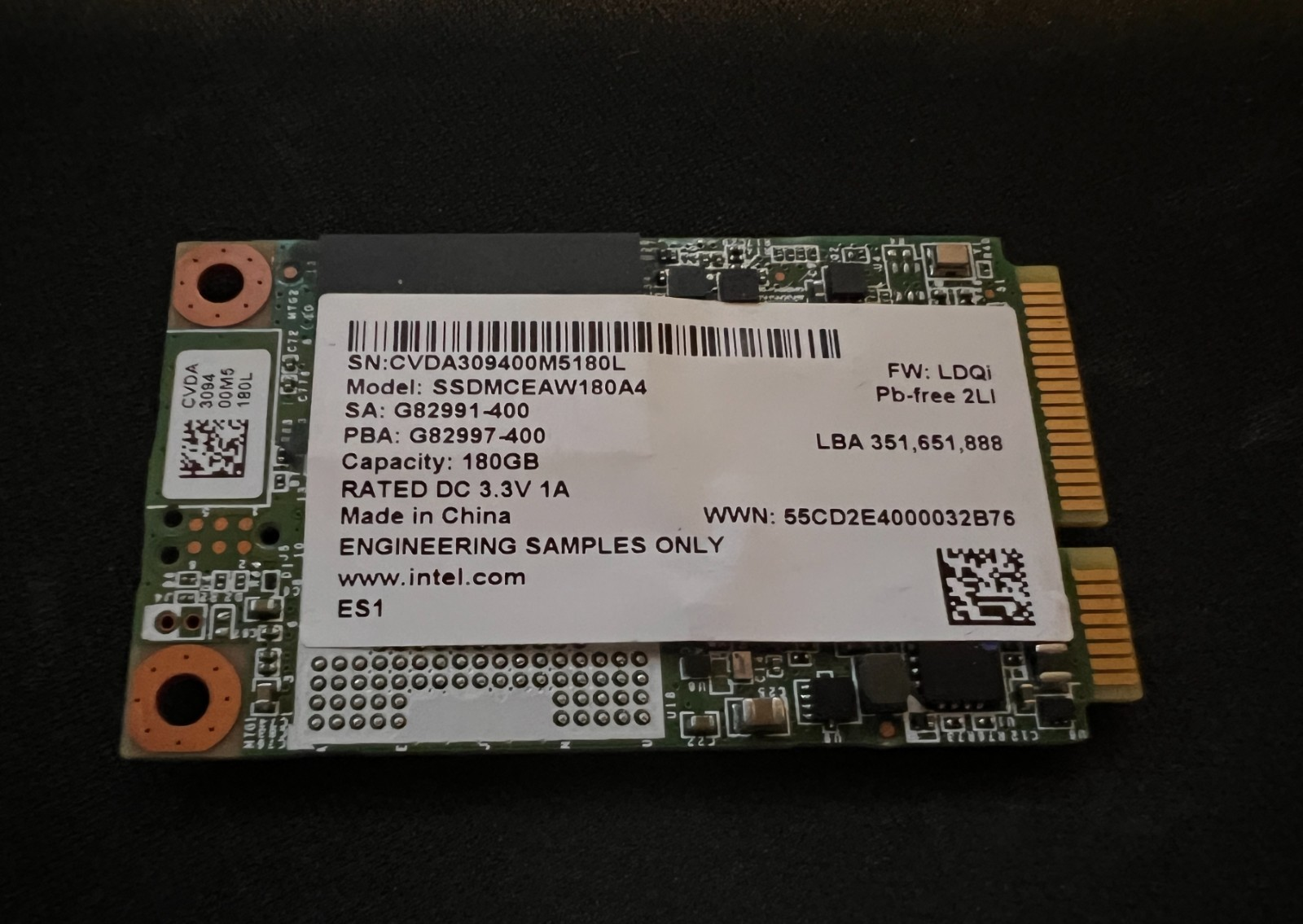
An Intel mSATA SSD

In 2008, Intel began shipping mainstream solid-state drives (SSDs) with up to 160 GB storage capacities. As with its CPUs, Intel develops SSD chips using ever-smaller nanometer processes. These SSDs make use of industry standards such as NAND flash, mSATA, PCIe, and NVMe. In 2017, Intel introduced SSDs based on 3D XPoint technology under the Optane brand name.

In 2021, SK Hynix acquired most of Intel's NAND memory business for $7 billion, with a remaining transaction worth $2 billion expected in 2025. Intel also discontinued its consumer Optane products in 2021. In July 2022, Intel disclosed in its Q2 earnings report that it would cease future product development within its Optane business, which in turn effectively discontinued the development of 3D XPoint as a whole.

=== Supercomputers ===
The Intel Scientific Computers division was founded in 1984 by Justin Rattner to design and produce parallel computers based on Intel microprocessors connected in hypercube internetwork topology. In 1992, the name was changed to the Intel Supercomputing Systems Division, and development of the iWarp architecture was also subsumed. The division designed several supercomputer systems, including the Intel iPSC/1, iPSC/2, iPSC/860, Paragon and ASCI Red. In November 2014, Intel stated that it was planning to use optical fibers to improve networking within supercomputers.

=== Fog computing ===
On November 19, 2015, Intel, alongside Arm, Dell, Cisco Systems, Microsoft, and Princeton University, founded the OpenFog Consortium, to promote interests and development in fog computing. Intel's Chief Strategist for the IoT Strategy and Technology Office, Jeff Fedders, became the consortium's first president.

=== Self-driving cars ===
Intel is one of the biggest stakeholders in the self-driving car industry, having joined the race in mid 2017 after joining forces with Mobileye. Intel's strategy to this is computer-centric, solutions-based and an end-to-end one spanning the car to the datacenter. The company is also one of the first in the sector to research consumer acceptance, after an American Automobile Association report quoted a 78% nonacceptance rate of the technology in the U.S. in 2017.

Safety levels of autonomous driving technology, the thought of abandoning control to a machine, and psychological comfort of passengers in such situations were the major discussion topics initially. The commuters also stated that they did not want to see everything the car was doing. This was primarily a reference to the movement of the auto-steering wheel with no one sitting in the driving seat. Intel also learned that a voice control regulator is vital, and the interface between the humans and machine eases the discomfort condition, and brings back some sense of control. Intel included only 10 people in this study, which makes the study less credible. In a video posted on YouTube, Intel accepted this fact and called for further testing.

=== Programmable devices ===
Intel formed a new business unit called the Programmable Solutions Group (PSG) on completion of its Altera acquisition. Intel has since sold Stratix, Arria, and Cyclone FPGAs. In 2019, Intel released Agilex FPGAs: chips aimed at data centers, 5G applications, and other uses.

In October 2023, Intel announced it would be spinning off PSG into a separate company at the start of 2024, while maintaining majority ownership. In September 2025, Intel sold the majority stake to Silver Lake and retained a 49% passive stake.

=== Platforms and standards ===
- Centrino
- Common Building Block
- Ultrabook
- Intel Evo
- Muscle (note)book
- AI quiet gaming laptop (AI 高静游戏本)

=== Competition, antitrust, and espionage ===
By the end of the 1990s, microprocessor performance had outstripped software demand for that CPU power. Aside from high-end server systems and software, whose demand dropped with the end of the "dot-com bubble", consumer systems ran effectively on increasingly low-cost systems after 2000.

Intel's strategy was to develop processors with better performance in a short time, from the appearance of one to the other, as seen with the appearance of the Pentium II in May 1997, the Pentium III in February 1999, and the Pentium 4 in autumn 2000, making the strategy ineffective since the consumer did not see the innovation as essential, and leaving an opportunity for rapid gains by competitors, notably AMD. This, in turn, lowered the profitability of the processor line and ended an era of unprecedented dominance of PC hardware by Intel.

Intel's dominance in the x86 microprocessor market led to numerous charges of antitrust violations over the years, including U.S. FTC investigations in both the late 1980s and in 1999, and civil actions such as the 1997 suit by Digital Equipment Corporation (DEC) and a patent suit by Intergraph. Intel's market dominance (at one time it controlled over 85% of the market for 32-bit x86 microprocessors) combined with Intel's own hardball legal tactics (such as its infamous 338 patent suit versus PC manufacturers), culminating in Intel agreeing to pay AMD $1.25 billion and grant it a perpetual patent cross-license in 2009 as well as several anti-trust judgements in Europe, Korea, and Japan.

A case of industrial espionage arose in 1995 that involved both Intel and AMD. Bill Gaede, an Argentine formerly employed both at AMD and at Intel's Arizona plant, was arrested for attempting in 1993 to sell the i486 and P5 Pentium designs to AMD and to certain foreign powers. Gaede videotaped data from his computer screen at Intel and mailed it to AMD, which immediately alerted Intel and authorities, resulting in Gaede's arrest. Gaede was convicted and sentenced to 33 months in prison in June 1996.

== Market standing ==
=== Operating segments ===
- Client Computing Group – 51.8% of 2020 revenues – produces PC processors and related components.
- Data Center Group – 33.7% of 2020 revenues – produces hardware components used in server, network, and storage platforms.
- Internet of Things Group – 5.2% of 2020 revenues – offers platforms designed for retail, transportation, industrial, buildings and home use.
- Programmable Solutions Group – 2.4% of 2020 revenues – manufactures programmable semiconductors (primarily FPGAs).

=== Customers ===
In 2023, Dell accounted for about 19% of Intel's total revenues, Lenovo accounted for 11% of total revenues, and HP Inc. accounted for 10% of total revenues. As of May 2024, the U.S. Department of Defense is another large customer for Intel. In September 2024, Intel reportedly qualified for as much as $3.5 billion in federal grants to make semiconductors for the Defense Department.

=== Market share ===
According to IDC, while Intel enjoyed the biggest market share in both the overall worldwide PC microprocessor market (73.3%) and the mobile PC microprocessor (80.4%) in the second quarter of 2011, the numbers decreased by 1.5% and 1.9% compared to the first quarter of 2011. As of 2023, Intel has a 68.4% market share in the x86 market. In 2024, Intel was the world's third-largest semiconductor chip manufacturer by revenue.

Intel's market share decreased significantly in the enthusiast market as of 2019, and it faced delays for its 10 nm products. According to former Intel CEO Bob Swan, the delay was caused by the company's overly aggressive strategy for moving to its next node.

==== Historical market share ====
In the 1980s, Intel was among the world's top ten sellers of semiconductors (10th in 1987). Along with Microsoft Windows, it was part of the "Wintel" personal computer domination in the 1990s and early 2000s. In the 1990s, the company had a 90% market share in the PC microprocessor market. In 1992, Intel became the biggest semiconductor chip maker by revenue and held the position until 2018 when Samsung Electronics surpassed it, but Intel returned to its former position the year after. Other major semiconductor companies include TSMC, GlobalFoundries, Texas Instruments, ASML, STMicroelectronics, United Microelectronics Corporation (UMC), Micron, SK Hynix, Kioxia, and SMIC.

Since the 2000s and especially the late 2010s, Intel has faced increasing competition from AMD, which has led to a decline in its dominance and market share in the PC market.

=== Major competitors ===
Intel's competitors in PC chipsets included AMD, VIA Technologies, Silicon Integrated Systems, and Nvidia. Intel's competitors in networking include NXP Semiconductors, Infineon, Broadcom Limited, Marvell Technology Group and Applied Micro Circuits Corporation, and competitors in flash memory included Spansion, Samsung Electronics, Qimonda, Kioxia, STMicroelectronics, Micron, SK Hynix, and IBM.

The only major competitor in the x86 processor market is AMD, with which Intel has had full cross-licensing agreements since 1976: each partner can use the other's patented technological innovations without charge after a certain time. However, the cross-licensing agreement is canceled in the event of an AMD bankruptcy or takeover.

Some smaller competitors, such as VIA Technologies, produce low-power x86 processors for small factor computers and portable equipment. However, the advent of such mobile computing devices, in particular, smartphones, has led to a decline in PC sales. Since over 95% of the world's smartphones currently use processors cores designed by Arm, using the ARM instruction set, Arm has become a major competitor for Intel's processor market. Arm is also planning to make attempts at entering the PC and server market, with Ampere and IBM each individually designing CPUs for servers and supercomputers. The only other major competitor in processor instruction sets is RISC-V, which is an open source CPU instruction set. The major Chinese phone and telecommunications manufacturer Huawei has released chips based on the RISC-V instruction set due to US sanctions against China.

Intel has been involved in several disputes regarding the violation of antitrust laws, which are noted below.

=== Manufacturing ===
Intel has wafer fabrication plants in the United States, Ireland, and Israel. It also has assembly and testing sites in China, Costa Rica, Malaysia, and Vietnam, and one site in the United States.

Intel's ability to design and manufacture its own chips is considered a rarity in the semiconductor industry, as most chip designers do not have their own production facilities and instead rely on contract manufacturers (e.g. TSMC, Foxconn and Samsung), as AMD and Nvidia do.

== Corporate affairs ==
=== Business trends ===
The key trends for Intel are (as of the financial year ending in late December):

Year	Revenue (US$ bn)	Net profit (US$ bn)	Total assets (US$ bn)	Employees (k)
2017	62.7	9.6	123	102
2018	70.8	21.0	127	107
2019	71.9	21.0	136	110
2020	77.8	20.8	153	110
2021	79.0	19.8	168	121
2022	63.0	8.0	182	131
2023	54.2	1.6	191	124
2024	53.1	−19.2	196	109
2025	52.9	−0.3	211	85

=== Leadership and corporate structure ===
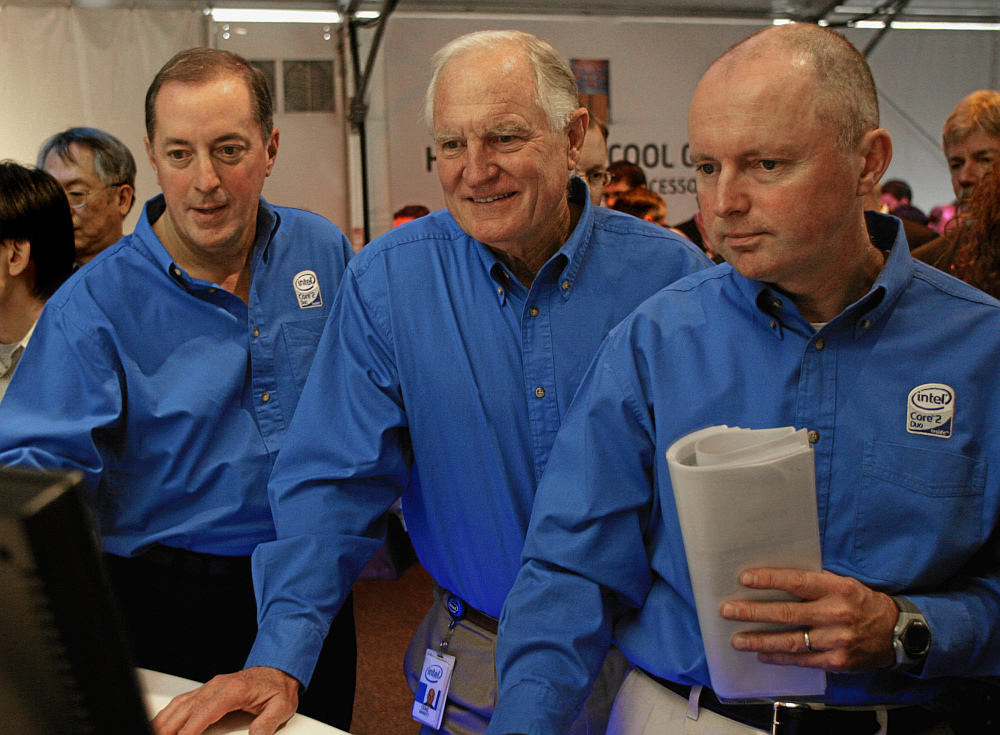
Paul Otellini, Craig Barrett and Sean Maloney in 2006

Robert Noyce was Intel's CEO at its founding in 1968, followed by co-founder Gordon Moore in 1975. Andy Grove became the company's president in 1979 and added the CEO title in 1987 when Moore became chairman. In 1998, Grove succeeded Moore as chairman, and Craig Barrett, already company president, took over. On May 18, 2005, Barrett handed the reins of the company over to Paul Otellini, who had been the company president and Chief Operating Officer (COO) and who was responsible for Intel's design win in the original IBM PC. The board of directors elected Otellini as president and CEO, and Barrett replaced Grove as Chairman of the Board. Grove stepped down as chairman but is retained as a special adviser. In May 2009, Barrett stepped down as chairman of the board and was succeeded by Jane Shaw. In May 2012, Intel vice chairman Andy Bryant, who had held the posts of Chief Financial Officer (CFO) (1994) and Chief Administrative Officer (2007) at Intel, succeeded Shaw as executive chairman.

In November 2012, president and CEO Paul Otellini announced that he would step down in May 2013 at the age of 62, three years before the company's mandatory retirement age. During a six-month transition period, Intel's board of directors commenced a search process for the next CEO, in which it considered both internal managers and external candidates such as Sanjay Jha and Patrick Gelsinger. Financial results revealed that, under Otellini, Intel's revenue increased by 55.8% (US$34.2 to 53.3 billion), while its net income increased by 46.7% (US$7.5 billion to 11 billion).

On May 2, 2013, Executive Vice President and COO Brian Krzanich was elected as Intel's sixth CEO, a selection that became effective on May 16, 2013, at the company's annual meeting. Reportedly, the board concluded that an insider could proceed with the role and exert an impact more quickly, without the need to learn Intel's processes, and Krzanich was selected on such a basis. Intel's software head Renée James was selected as president of the company, a role that is second to the CEO position.

As of May 2013, Intel's board of directors consisted of Andy Bryant, John Donahoe, Frank Yeary, Ambassador Charlene Barshefsky, Susan Decker, Reed Hundt, Paul Otellini, James Plummer, David Pottruck, and David Yoffie and Creative director will.i.am. The board was described by former Financial Times journalist Tom Foremski as "an exemplary example of corporate governance of the highest order" and received a rating of ten from GovernanceMetrics International, a form of recognition that has only been awarded to twenty-one other corporate boards worldwide.

On June 21, 2018, Intel announced the resignation of Brian Krzanich as CEO, with the exposure of a relationship he had with an employee. Bob Swan was named interim CEO, as the Board began a search for a permanent CEO.

On January 31, 2019, Swan transitioned from his role as CFO and interim CEO and was named by the Board as the seventh CEO to lead the company.

On January 13, 2021, Intel announced that Swan would be replaced as CEO by Pat Gelsinger, effective February 15. Gelsinger is a former Intel chief technology officer who had previously been head of VMWare.

In March 2021, Intel removed the mandatory retirement age for its corporate officers.

In October 2023, Intel announced it would be spinning off its Programmable Solutions Group business unit into a separate company at the start of 2024, while maintaining majority ownership and intending to seek an IPO within three years to raise funds.

On December 1, 2024, Pat Gelsinger retired from the position of Intel CEO and stepped down from the company's board of directors. David Zinsner and Michelle Johnston Holthaus were named as interim co-CEOs. On March 13, 2025, it was announced that he would be formally replaced by American Lip-Bu Tan starting March 18, 2025.

In August 2025, Intel announced an agreement to give the U.S. government a 9.9% equity stake in exchange for CHIPS Act funding previously allocated during the Biden administration. The federal government will not have any controlling interest in the company. By tying funding to U.S. manufacturing, R&D focus, and supply chain rules, the government indirectly shapes production priorities without formally controlling the company.

=== Board of directors ===
As of March 2023:

- Frank D. Yeary (chairman), managing member of Darwin Capital
- James Goetz, managing director of Sequoia Capital
- Andrea Goldsmith, dean of engineering and applied science at Princeton University
- Alyssa Henry, Square, Inc. executive
- Omar Ishrak, chairman and former CEO of Medtronic
- Risa Lavizzo-Mourey, former president and CEO of the Robert Wood Johnson Foundation
- Tsu-Jae King Liu, professor at the UC Berkeley College of Engineering
- Barbara G. Novick, co-founder of BlackRock
- Gregory Smith, CFO of Boeing
- Dion Weisler, former president and CEO of HP Inc.
- Lip-Bu Tan, executive chairman of Cadence Design Systems

=== Employment ===
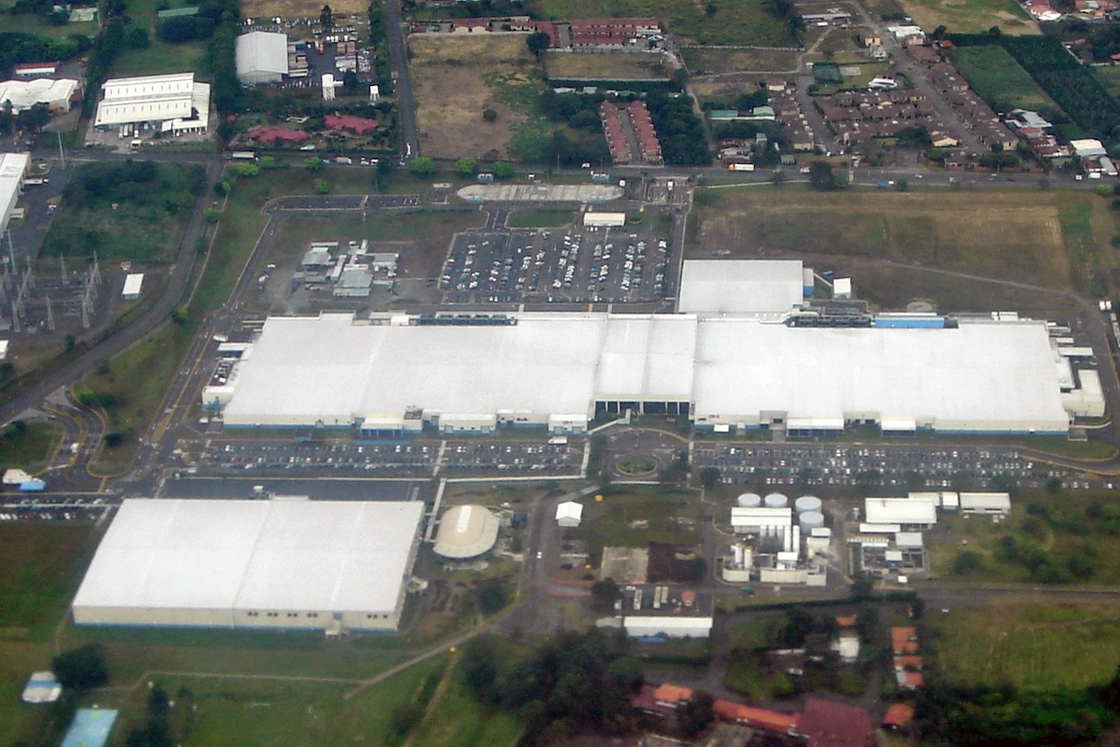
Intel's microprocessor facility in Costa Rica was responsible in 2006 for 20% of Costa Rican exports and 4.9% of the country's GDP.

Prior to March 2021, Intel had a mandatory retirement policy for its CEOs when they reach age 65. Andy Grove retired at 62, while both Robert Noyce and Gordon Moore retired at 58. Grove retired as chairman and as a member of the board of directors in 2005 at age 68.

Intel's headquarters are located in Santa Clara, California, and the company has operations around the world. Its largest workforce concentration anywhere is in Washington County, Oregon (in the Portland metropolitan area's "Silicon Forest"), with 18,600 employees at several facilities. Outside the United States, the company has facilities in China, Costa Rica, Malaysia, Israel, Ireland, India, Russia, Argentina and Vietnam, in 63 countries and regions internationally. In March 2022, Intel stopped supplying the Russian market because of international sanctions during the Russo-Ukrainian War. In the U.S. Intel employs significant numbers of people in California, Colorado, Massachusetts, Arizona, New Mexico, Oregon, Texas, Washington and Utah. In Oregon, Intel is the state's largest private employer. The company is the largest industrial employer in New Mexico while in Arizona the company has 12,000 employees as of January 2020.

Intel invests heavily in research in China and about 100 researchers – or 10% of the total number of researchers from Intel – are located in Beijing.

In 2011, the Israeli government offered Intel $290 million to expand in the country. As a condition, Intel would employ 1,500 more workers in Kiryat Gat and between 600 and 1000 workers in the north.

In January 2014, it was reported that Intel would cut about 5,000 jobs from its workforce of 107,000. The announcement was made a day after it reported earnings that missed analyst targets.

In March 2014, it was reported that Intel would embark upon a $6 billion plan to expand its activities in Israel. The plan called for continued investment in existing and new Intel plants until 2030. As of 2014, Intel employed 10,000 workers at four development centers and two production plants in Israel.

Due to declining PC sales, in 2016 Intel cut 12,000 jobs. In 2021, Intel reversed course under new CEO Pat Gelsinger and started hiring thousands of engineers.

==== Diversity ====
Intel has a Diversity Initiative, including employee diversity groups, as well as a supplier diversity program. Like many companies with employee diversity groups, they include groups based on race and nationality as well as sexual identity and religion. In 1994, Intel sanctioned one of the earliest corporate Gay, Lesbian, Bisexual, and Transgender employee groups, and supports a Muslim employees group, a Jewish employees group, and a Bible-based Christian group.

Intel has received a 100% rating on numerous Corporate Equality Indices released by the Human Rights Campaign including the first one released in 2002. In addition, the company is frequently named one of the 100 Best Companies for Working Mothers by Working Mother magazine.

In January 2015, Intel announced the investment of $300 million over five years to enhance gender and racial diversity in its own company as well as the technology industry as a whole.

In February 2016, Intel released its Global Diversity & Inclusion 2015 Annual Report. The male-female mix of U.S. employees was reported as 75.2% men and 24.8% women. For U.S. employees in technical roles, the mix was reported as 79.8% male and 20.1% female. NPR reported that Intel was facing a retention problem (particularly for African Americans), not just a pipeline problem.

==== Economic impact in Oregon in 2009 ====
In 2011, ECONorthwest conducted an economic impact analysis of Intel's economic contribution to the state of Oregon. The report found that in 2009 "the total economic impacts attributed to Intel's operations, capital spending, contributions and taxes amounted to almost $14.6 billion in activity, including $4.3 billion in personal income and 59,990 jobs". Through multiplier effects, every 10 Intel jobs supported, on average, was found to create 31 jobs in other sectors of the economy.

=== Supply chain ===
Intel has been addressing supply base reduction as an issue since the mid-1980's, adopting an "n + 1" rule of thumb, whereby the maximum number of suppliers required to maintain production levels for each component is determined, and no more than one additional supplier is engaged with for each component.

== Intel Israel ==
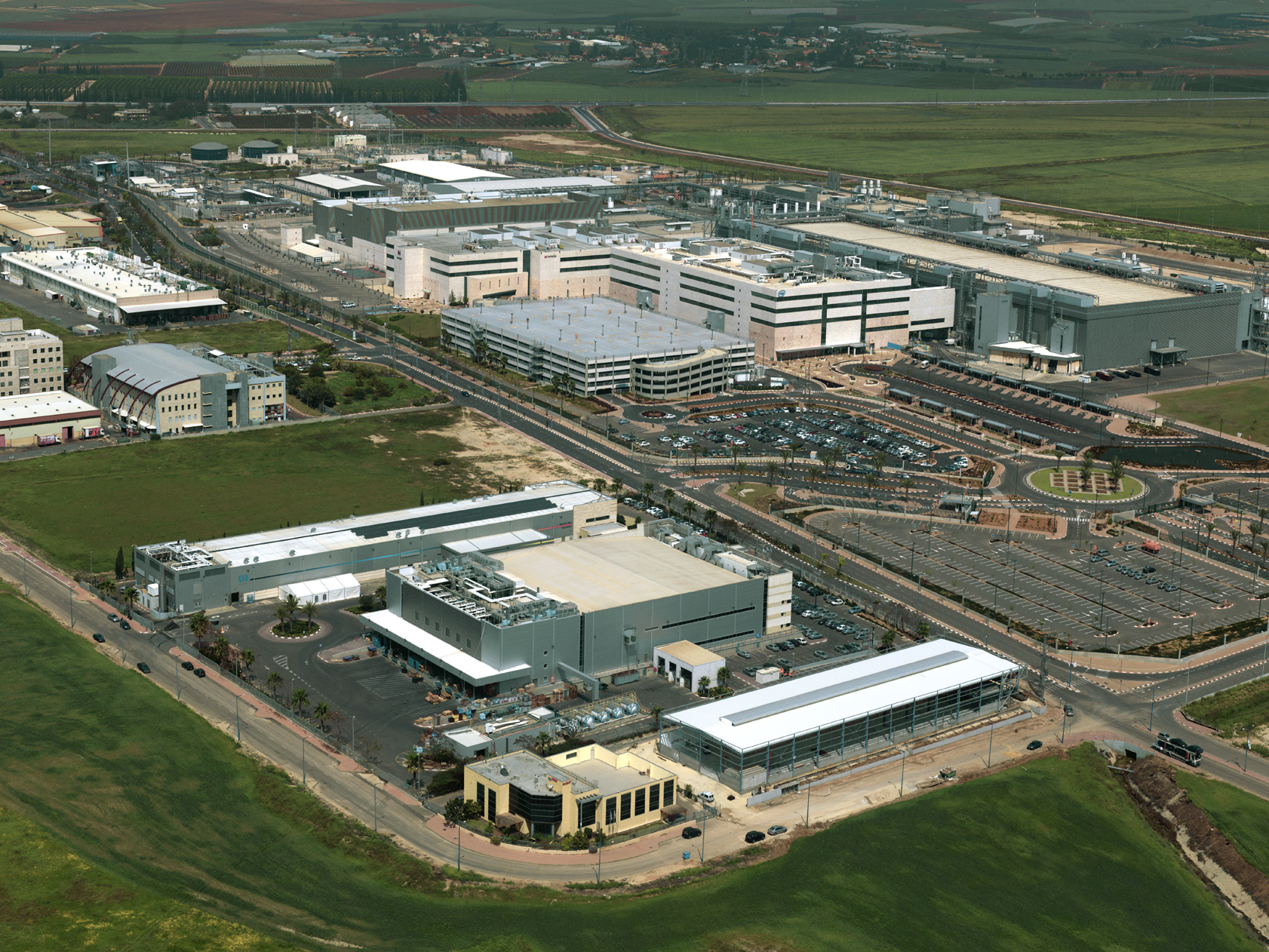
Intel Israel, Kiryat Gat

Intel has been operating in Israel since Dov Frohman founded the Israeli branch of the company in 1974 in a small office in Haifa. Intel Israel has development centers in Haifa, Jerusalem and Petah Tikva, and a plant in the Kiryat Gat industrial park that develops and manufactures microprocessors and communications products. Intel employed about 10,000 employees in Israel in 2013. Maxine Fesberg has been the CEO of Intel Israel since 2007 and the Vice President of Intel Global. In December 2016, Fesberg announced her resignation, her position of chief executive officer (CEO) has been filled by Yaniv Gerti since January 2017.

In June 2024, the company announced that it was stopping development on a Kiryat Gat-based factory in Israel. The site was expected to cost $25 billion, with $3.2 billion provided by the Israeli government in the form of a grant.

== Key acquisitions and investments ==
=== 2010–present ===
In 2010, Intel purchased McAfee, a manufacturer of computer security technology, for $7.68 billion. As a condition for regulatory approval of the transaction, Intel agreed to provide rival security firms with all necessary information that would allow their products to use Intel's chips and personal computers. After the acquisition, Intel had about 90,000 employees, including about 12,000 software engineers. In September 2016, Intel sold a majority stake in its computer-security unit to TPG Capital, reversing the five-year-old McAfee acquisition.

In August 2010, Intel and Infineon Technologies announced that Intel would acquire Infineon's Wireless Solutions business. Intel planned to use Infineon's technology in laptops, smart phones, netbooks, tablets and embedded computers in consumer products, eventually integrating its wireless modem into Intel's silicon chips.

In March 2011, Intel bought most of the assets of Cairo-based SySDSoft.

In July 2011, Intel announced that it had agreed to acquire Fulcrum Microsystems Incorporated, a company specializing in network switches. The company used to be included on the EE Times list of 60 Emerging Startups.

In October 2011, Intel reached a deal to acquire Telmap, an Israeli-based navigation software company. The purchase price was not disclosed, but Israeli media reported values around $300 million to $350 million.

In July 2012, Intel agreed to buy 10% of the shares of ASML Holding NV for $2.1 billion and another $1 billion for 5% of the shares that need shareholder approval to fund relevant research and development efforts, as part of a EUR3.3 billion (US$4.1 billion) deal to accelerate the development of 450-millimeter wafer technology and extreme ultra-violet lithography by as much as two years.

In July 2013, Intel confirmed the acquisition of Omek Interactive, an Israeli company that makes technology for gesture-based interfaces, without disclosing the monetary value of the deal. An official statement from Intel read: "The acquisition of Omek Interactive will help increase Intel's capabilities in the delivery of more immersive perceptual computing experiences." One report estimated the value of the acquisition between US$30 million and $50 million.

The acquisition of a Spanish natural language recognition startup, Indisys was announced in September 2013. The terms of the deal were not disclosed but an email from an Intel representative stated: "Intel has acquired Indisys, a privately held company based in Seville, Spain. The majority of Indisys employees joined Intel. We signed the agreement to acquire the company on May 31 and the deal has been completed." Indysis explains that its artificial intelligence (AI) technology "is a human image, which converses fluently and with common sense in multiple languages and also works in different platforms".

In December 2014, Intel bought PasswordBox.

In January 2015, Intel purchased a 30% stake in Vuzix, a smart glasses manufacturer. The deal was worth $24.8 million.

In February 2015, Intel announced its agreement to purchase German network chipmaker Lantiq, to aid in its expansion of its range of chips in devices with Internet connection capability.

In June 2015, Intel announced its agreement to purchase FPGA design company Altera for $16.7 billion, in its largest acquisition to date. The acquisition completed in December 2015.

In October 2015, Intel bought cognitive computing company Saffron Technology for an undisclosed price.

In August 2016, Intel purchased deep-learning startup Nervana Systems for over $400 million.

In December 2016, Intel acquired computer vision startup Movidius for an undisclosed price.

In March 2017, Intel announced it had agreed to purchase Mobileye, an Israeli developer of "autonomous driving" systems for US$15.3 billion.

In June 2017, Intel Corporation announced an investment of over ₹1,100 crore (US$120 million) for its upcoming Research and Development centre in Bangalore, India.

In January 2019, Intel announced an investment of over $11 billion on a new Israeli chip plant, as told by the Israeli Finance Minister.

In November 2021, Intel recruited some of the employees of the Centaur Technology division from VIA Technologies, a deal worth $125 million, and effectively acquiring the talent and know-how of its x86 division. VIA retained the x86 licence and associated patents, and its Zhaoxin CPU joint-venture continues.

In December 2021, Intel said it will invest $7.1 billion to build a new chip-packaging and testing factory in Malaysia. The new investment would expand the operations of its Malaysian subsidiary across Penang and Kulim, creating more than 4,000 new Intel jobs and more than 5,000 local construction jobs. In the same month, Intel announced its plan to take Mobileye automotive unit public via an IPO of newly issued stock in 2022, maintaining its majority ownership of the company.

In February 2022, Intel agreed to acquire Israeli chip manufacturer Tower Semiconductor for $5.4 billion. In August 2023, Intel terminated the acquisition as it failed to obtain approval from Chinese regulators within the 18-month transaction deadline.

In May 2022, Intel announced it had acquired Finnish graphics technology firm Siru innovations. The firm founded by ex-AMD Qualcomm mobile GPU engineers, was focused on developing software and silicon building blocks for GPU's made by other companies and was set to join Intel's fledgling Accelerated Computing Systems and Graphics Group.

In May 2022, it was announced that Ericsson and Intel had pooled to launch a tech hub in California to focus on the research and development of cloud RAN technology. The hub focuses on improving Ericsson Cloud RAN and Intel technology, including improving energy efficiency and network performance, reducing time to market, and monetizing new business opportunities such as enterprise applications.

In April 2024, Intel reached a definitive agreement to sell 51% of Altera to Silver Lake. With this sale and Silver Lake now owning a majority stake, Intel also announced the cancellation of the potential IPO being conducted for Altera.

In October 2026, Intel agreed to buy Israel quantum software company Classiq for $2.2 billion.

=== Ultrabook fund (2011) ===
In 2011, Intel Capital announced a new fund to support startups working on technologies in line with the company's concept for next-generation notebooks. The company is setting aside a $300 million fund to be spent over the next three to four years in areas related to ultrabooks. Intel announced the ultrabook concept at Computex in 2011. The ultrabook is defined as a thin (less than 0.8 inches [~2 cm] thick) notebook that utilizes Intel processors and also incorporates tablet features such as a touch screen and long battery life.

At the Intel Developers Forum in 2011, four Taiwan ODMs showed prototype ultrabooks that used Intel's Ivy Bridge chips. Intel plans to improve power consumption of its chips for ultrabooks, like new Ivy Bridge processors in 2013, which will only have 10W default thermal design power.

Intel's goal for Ultrabook's price is below $1000; however, according to two presidents from Acer and Compaq, this goal will not be achieved if Intel does not lower the price of its chips.

=== Open source support ===
Intel has a significant participation in the open source communities since 1999. For example, in 2006 Intel released MIT-licensed X.org drivers for its integrated graphic cards of the i965 family of chipsets. Intel released FreeBSD drivers for some networking cards, available under a BSD-compatible license, which were also ported to OpenBSD. Binary firmware files for non-wireless Ethernet devices were also released under a BSD licence allowing free redistribution. Intel ran the Moblin project until April 23, 2009, when it handed the project over to the Linux Foundation. Intel also runs the LessWatts.org campaigns.

However, after the release of the wireless products called Intel Pro/Wireless 2100, 2200BG/2225BG/2915ABG and 3945ABG in 2005, Intel was criticized for not granting free redistribution rights for the firmware that must be included in the operating system for the wireless devices to operate. As a result of this, Intel became a target of campaigns to allow free operating systems to include binary firmware on terms acceptable to the open source community. Linspire-Linux creator Michael Robertson outlined the difficult position that Intel was in releasing to open source, as Intel did not want to upset its large customer Microsoft. Theo de Raadt of OpenBSD also claimed that Intel is being "an Open Source fraud" after an Intel employee presented a distorted view of the situation at an open source conference. In spite of the significant negative attention Intel received as a result of the wireless dealings, the binary firmware still, as of late 2014, had not gained a license compatible with free software principles.

Intel has also supported other open source projects such as Blender and Open 3D Engine.

== Corporate identity ==
=== Logo ===
Logo history

April 1969–January 2, 2006 (The logo displayed here is the 1991 variant designed by Landor Associates.)

January 3, 2006–September 1, 2020

September 2, 2020–present

Throughout its history, Intel has had three distinctive logos.

The first Intel logo, introduced in April 1969 and created by Robert Noyce and Gordon Moore, featured the company's name stylized in all lowercase with the Helvetica font in a cool blue color. It has the letter "e" dropped below the other letters, connecting the T and L, making it seem as if the E had "fallen" from the line. The logo is known as the "dropped-e" logo.

The second logo, officially introduced on January 3, 2006, was created by FutureBrand. The logo combines elements of both the previous logo and the Intel Inside campaign while also modernizing it. It brings simplicity and unification to the look of many of Intel's products. It abandons the famous "dropped-e" the logo used to have in favor of a "vortex," made up of two stripes of varying thickness. Additionally, it featured a stylized version of the new Neo Sans Intel font, a variation of Neo Sans. The refreshed logo also signals where the company was headed at that time. The logo often featured Intel's new "Leap Ahead" tagline alongside it. Images of the new brand identity had begun circulating online earlier in November 2005, originally by a French site known as x86-Secret. It was subsequently taken down by Intel's legal team but reuploaded later by Taiwanese site DigiTimes. In 2014, the typeface was changed to Intel Clear, created by Red Peak Branding and Dalton Maag.

The third logo, introduced on September 2, 2020, was created by Andrew Mirikian of VMLY&R using the Intel One custom font. It was inspired by the previous logos and is meant to show that the Intel brand is both traditional and reliable. It removes the swirl and redesigns the style of the letters to form a refined symmetry, balance, and proportion. It squares off the corners of the I and L to convey reliability and endurance. The N and E now retain a classic feel seen in the original April 1969 logo. The dot on the I is the new visual identity and represents the potential and power of their processor. It is stated as the "only symbol Intel needs."

=== Intel Inside ===
The "Intel Inside" logo used from April 26, 1991 to January 2, 2006 later 1995

The "Intel Inside" logo used from November 14, 2002 to January 2, 2006

The "Intel Inside" logo used from January 3, 2006 to April 3, 2014

The "Intel Inside" logo used from April 4, 2014 to September 1, 2020

The current "Intel Inside" badge used since September 2, 2020, also used as the umbrella branding to promote Intel's low-end processors since 2023

Intel has become one of the world's most recognizable computer brands following its long-running Intel Inside campaign. The idea for "Intel Inside" came out of a meeting between Intel and one of the major computer resellers, MicroAge.

In the late 1980s, Intel's market share was being seriously eroded by upstart competitors such as AMD, Zilog, and others who had started to sell their less expensive microprocessors to computer manufacturers. This was because, by using cheaper processors, manufacturers could make cheaper computers and gain more market share in an increasingly price-sensitive market. In 1989, Intel's Dennis Carter visited MicroAge's headquarters in Tempe, Arizona, to meet with MicroAge's VP of Marketing, Ron Mion. MicroAge had become one of the largest distributors of Compaq, IBM, HP, and others and thus was a primary – although indirect – driver of demand for microprocessors. Intel wanted MicroAge to petition its computer suppliers to favor Intel chips. However, Mion felt that the marketplace should decide which processors they wanted. Intel's counterargument was that it would be too difficult to educate PC buyers on why Intel microprocessors were worth paying more for.

Mion felt that the public did not really need to fully understand why Intel chips were better, they just needed to feel they were better. So Mion proposed a market test. Intel would pay for a MicroAge billboard somewhere saying, "If you're buying a personal computer, make sure it has Intel inside." In turn, MicroAge would put "Intel Inside" stickers on the Intel-based computers in their stores in that area. To make the test easier to monitor, Mion decided to do the test in Boulder, Colorado, where it had a single store. Virtually overnight, the sales of personal computers in that store dramatically shifted to Intel-based PCs. Intel very quickly adopted "Intel Inside" as its primary branding and rolled it out worldwide. As is often the case with computer lore, other tidbits have been combined to explain how things evolved. "Intel Inside" has not escaped that tendency and there are other "explanations".

Intel's branding campaign started with "The Computer Inside" tagline in 1990 in the U.S. and Europe. The Japan chapter of Intel proposed an "Intel in it" tagline and kicked off the Japanese campaign by hosting EKI-KON (meaning "Station Concert" in Japanese) at the Tokyo railway station dome on Christmas Day, December 25, 1990. Several months later, "The Computer Inside" incorporated the Japan idea to become "Intel Inside" which eventually elevated to the worldwide branding campaign in 1991, by Intel marketing manager Dennis Carter. A case study, "Inside Intel Inside", was put together by Harvard Business School. The five-note jingle was introduced in 1994 and by its tenth anniversary was being heard in 130 countries around the world. The initial branding agency for the "Intel Inside" campaign was DahlinSmithWhite Advertising of Salt Lake City. The Intel swirl logo was the work of DahlinSmithWhite art director Steve Grigg under the direction of Intel president and CEO Andy Grove.

The Intel Inside advertising campaign sought public brand loyalty and awareness of Intel processors in consumer computers. Intel paid some of the advertiser's costs for an ad that used the Intel Inside logo and xylo-marimba jingle.

In 2008, Intel planned to shift the emphasis of its Intel Inside campaign from traditional media such as television and print to newer media such as the Internet. Intel required that a minimum of 35% of the money it provided to the companies in its co-op program be used for online marketing. The Intel 2010 annual financial report indicated that $1.8 billion (6% of the gross margin and nearly 16% of the total net income) was allocated to all advertising with Intel Inside being part of that.

In 2014, the Intel Inside branding was changed to reflect the new Intel Clear font.

In April 2025, chief marketing officer Brett Hannath announced a new marketing campaign—"That's the power of Intel Inside"—to highlight the usage of Intel products across different markets and industries.

=== Jingle ===
"Intel Spiral"

The D♭–D♭–G♭–D♭–A♭ xylophone/marimba jingle, known as the "Intel Spiral" or "Intel Bong", used in Intel advertising was written by Walter Werzowa of Musikvergnuegen. The Intel jingle was made in 1994 to coincide with the launch of the Pentium. It was modified in 1999 to coincide with the launch of the Pentium III, although it overlapped with the 1994 version which was not phased out until 2014. An alternate 1999 version can be heard in Pentium III M advertisements. Advertisements for products featuring Intel processors with prominent MMX branding featured a version of the jingle with a shortened first note and an embellishment (shining sound) after the final note in conjunction with the MMX label fading in. In some advertisements, the full jingle is played with the embellishment.

The jingle was remade a second time in 2004 to coincide with the new logo change. Again, it overlapped with the 1999 version and was not mainstreamed until the launch of the Core processors in 2006, with the melody unchanged.

Another remake of the jingle debuted with Intel's new visual identity. The company has made use of numerous variants since its rebranding in 2020 (while retaining the mainstream 2006 version).

In 2017, the United States Copyright Office registered a copyright claim to the 1994 sound recording of the "Intel Spiral", as it "contained a perceptible and sufficient amount of creative production authorship". However, registration was refused for the underlying musical composition, a perfect octave followed by a four-note sequence, as it was below the threshold of originality.

=== Processor naming strategy ===
The 2020 Intel badge representing the Core i7 brand combined with the vPro platform marketing term

In 2006, Intel expanded its promotion of open specification platforms beyond Centrino, to include the Viiv media center PC and the business desktop Intel vPro.

In mid-January 2006, Intel announced that it was dropping the long running Pentium name from its processors. The Pentium name was first used to refer to the P5 core Intel processors and was done to comply with court rulings that prevent the trademarking of a string of numbers, so competitors could not just call their processor the same name, as had been done with the prior 386 and 486 processors (both of which had copies manufactured by IBM and AMD). They phased out the Pentium names from mobile processors first, when the new Yonah chips, branded Core Solo and Core Duo, were released. The desktop processors changed when the Core 2 line of processors were released. By 2009, Intel was using a good–better–best strategy with Celeron being good, Pentium better, and the Intel Core family representing the best the company has to offer.

According to spokesman Bill Calder, Intel has maintained only the Celeron brand, the Atom brand for netbooks and the vPro lineup for businesses. Since late 2009, Intel's mainstream processors have been called Celeron, Pentium, Core i3, Core i5, Core i7, and Core i9 in order of performance from lowest to highest. The 1st-generation Core products carry a 3 digit name, such as i5-750, the 2nd-generation products carry a 4 digit name, such as the i5-2500, and from 10th generation onwards, Intel processors have a 5 digit name, such as i9-10900K for desktop. In all cases, a 'K' at the end shows that it is an unlocked processor, enabling additional overclocking abilities (for instance, 2500K). vPro products will carry the Intel Core i7 vPro processor or the Intel Core i5 vPro processor name. In October 2011, Intel started to sell its Core i7-2700K "Sandy Bridge" chip to customers worldwide.

Since 2010, "Centrino" is only being applied to Intel's WiMAX and Wi-Fi technologies.

In 2022, Intel announced that they were dropping the Pentium and Celeron naming schemes for their desktop and laptop entry level processors. The "Intel Processor" branding would replace the Pentium and Celeron naming schemes starting in 2023.

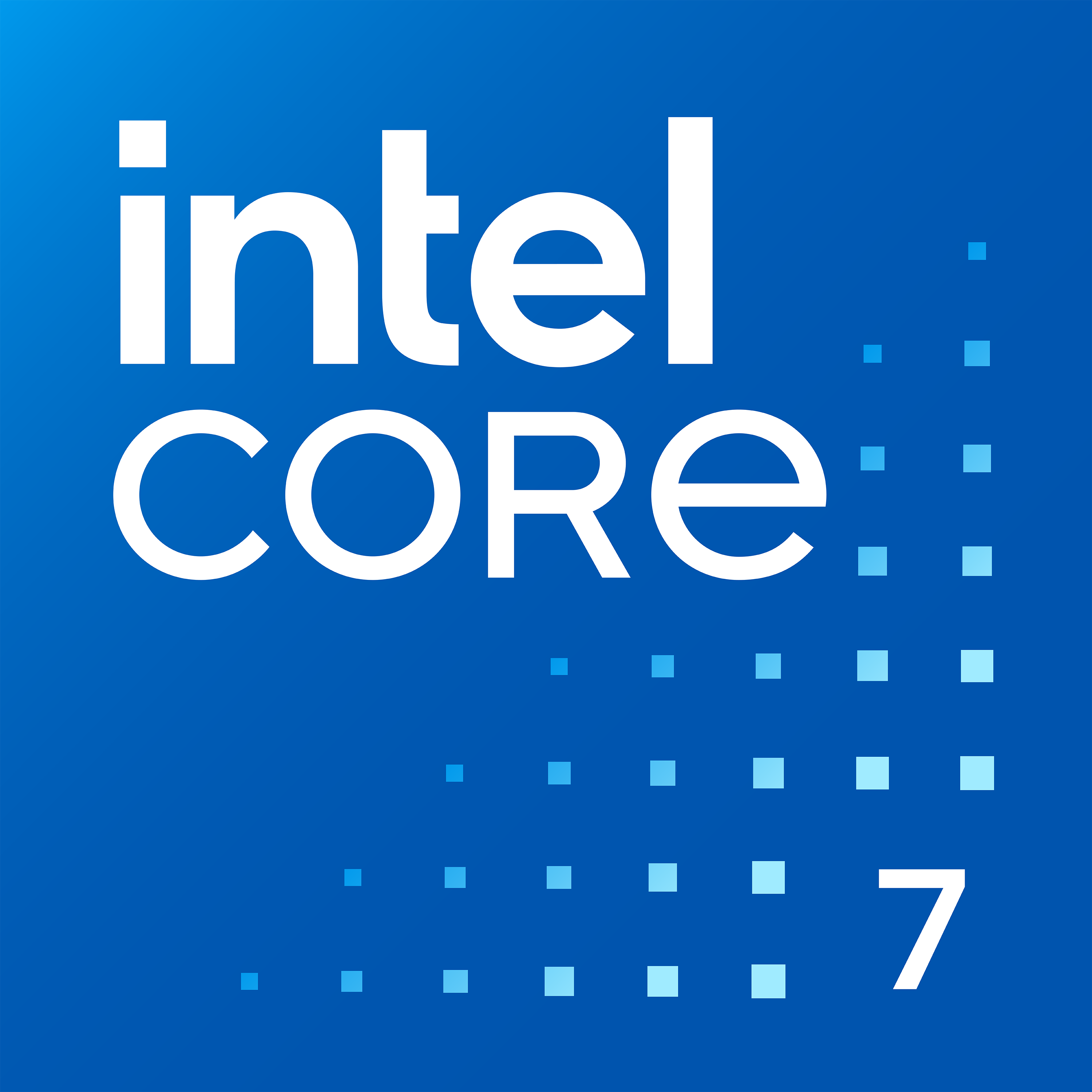
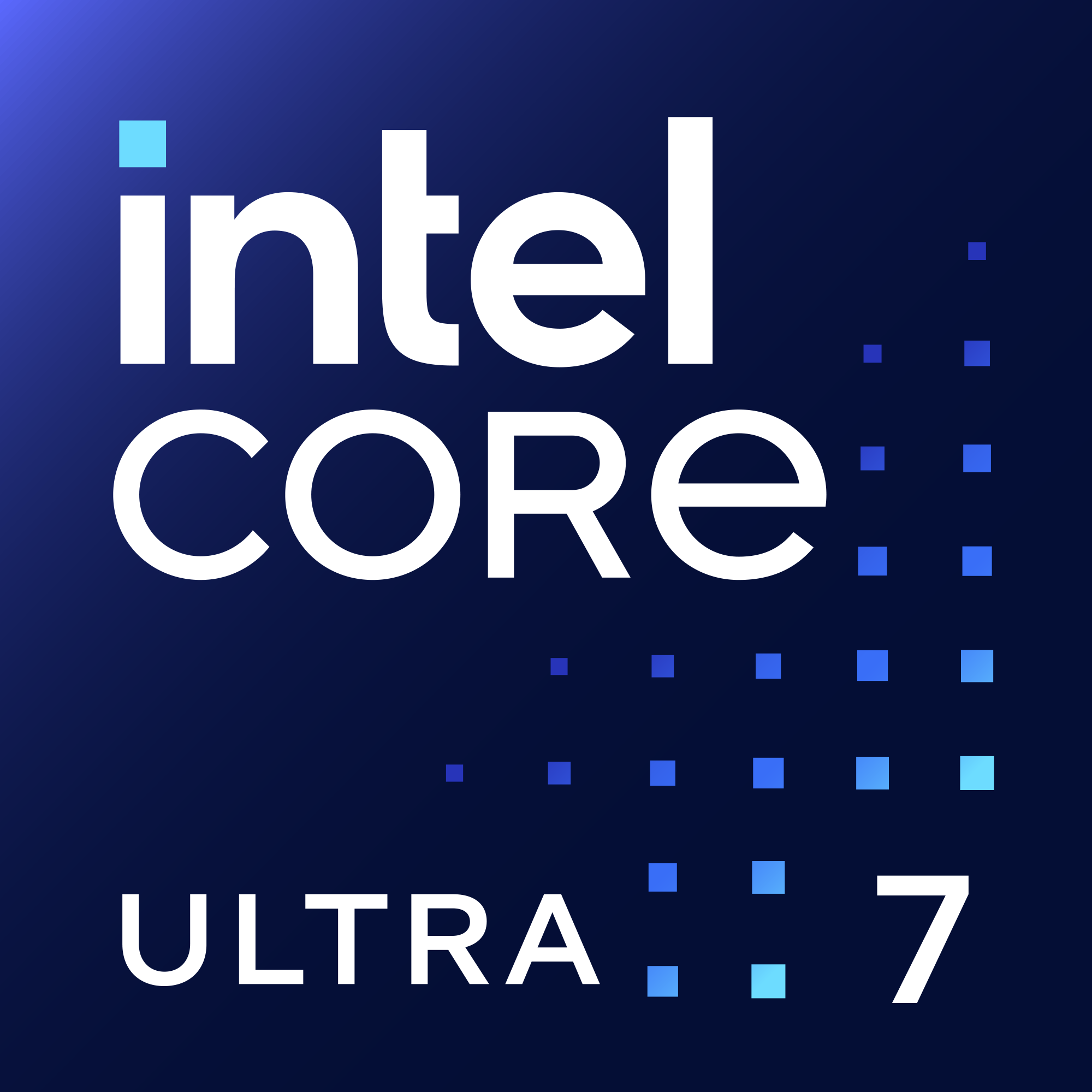
The since-2023 batches of the Intel Core 7 and the higher-end Intel Core Ultra 7 markings; they are direct successors to what has been known as the once-flagship Intel Core i7.

In 2023, Intel announced it would be dropping the 'i' in its future processor markings. For example, products such as Core i7, would be called Core 7. Ultra would be added to the endings of processors that were in the higher end, such as Core Ultra 7.

=== Typography ===
Neo Sans Intel is a customized version of Neo Sans based on the Neo Sans and Neo Tech, designed by Sebastian Lester in 2004. It was introduced alongside Intel's rebranding in 2006. Previously, Intel used Helvetica as its standard typeface in corporate marketing.

Intel Clear is a global font announced in 2014 designed for to be used across all communications. The font family was designed by Red Peek Branding and Dalton Maag. Initially available in Latin, Greek and Cyrillic scripts, it replaced Neo Sans Intel as the company's corporate typeface. Intel Clear Hebrew, Intel Clear Arabic were added by Dalton Maag Ltd. Neo Sans Intel remained in logo and to mark processor type and socket on the packaging of Intel's processors.

In 2020, as part of a new visual identity, a new typeface, Intel One, was released, designed by Tobias Frere-Jones and Fred Shallcrass of Frere-Jones Type. It has 3 optical sizes. It replaced Intel Clear as the font used by the company in most of its branding, however, it is used alongside Intel Clear typeface. In logo, it replaced Neo Sans Intel typeface. However, it is still used to mark processor type and socket on the packaging of Intel's processors.

=== Intel Brand Book ===
Intel Brand Book is a book produced by Red Peak Branding as part of Intel's brand identity campaign starting in 2017, celebrating the company's achievements while setting the new standard for what Intel looks, feels and sounds like.

=== Slogan history ===
Era	Slogan	Years active	Decade(s)
1	Intel® delivers.	November 1970 – 1973	1970s
2	Microcomputers. First from the beginning.	1973 – November 1, 1991	1970s–1980s–1990s
3	The Computer Inside.	November 2, 1991 – February 27, 1999	1990s
4	Intel Inside (slogan)	February 28, 1999 – April 17, 2000	1990s
5	Yes.	April 18, 2000 – January 2, 2006	2000s
6	Leap ahead™	January 3, 2006 – May 5, 2009	2000s
7	Sponsors of Tomorrow.™	May 6, 2009 – May 15, 2013	2000s–2010s
8	Look Inside.™	May 16, 2013 – April 29, 2015	2010s
9	experience what's inside™	April 30, 2015 – September 1, 2020	2010s–2020s
10	What's inside has never mattered more.	September 2, 2020	2020s
11	Do something wonderful.™	September 3, 2020 – September 5, 2022	2020s
12	How wonderful is that?	September 6, 2022 – December 4, 2023	2020s
13	It starts with Intel.	December 5, 2023 – April 1, 2025	2020s
14	That's the power of Intel Inside.™	April 2, 2025 – present	2020s

== Charity ==
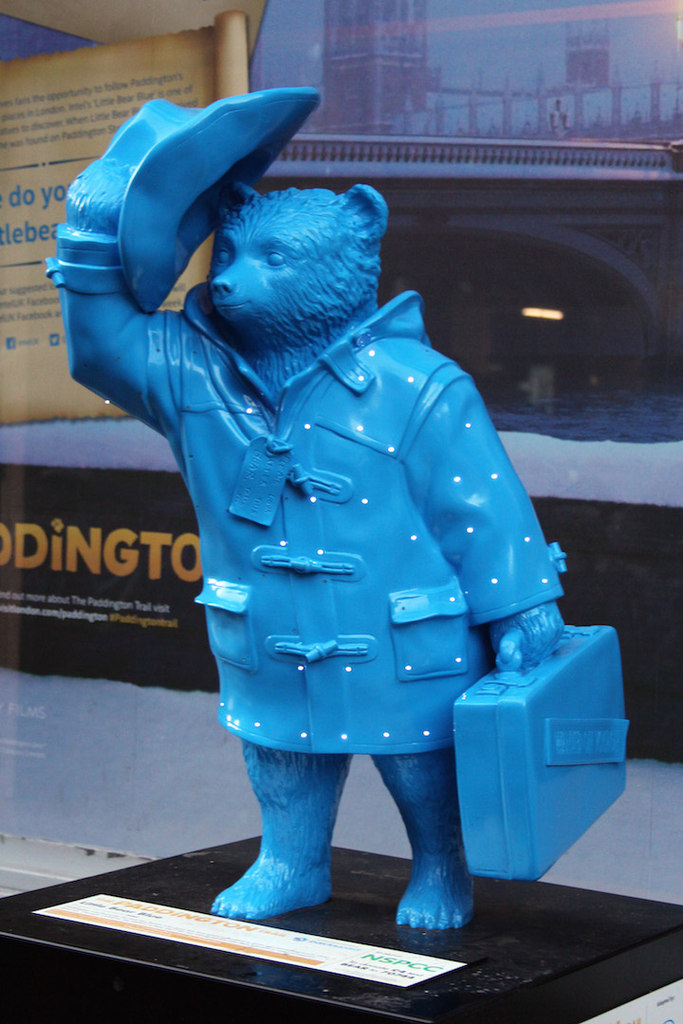
Paddington Bear statue in London designed by Intel, auctioned for the NSPCC

In November 2014, Intel designed a Paddington Bear statue—themed "Little Bear Blue"—, one of fifty statues created by various celebrities and companies which were located around London, England. Created prior to the release of the film Paddington, the Intel-designed statue was located outside Framestore in Chancery Lane, London, a British visual-effects company which uses Intel technology for films including Paddington. The statues were then auctioned to raise funds for the National Society for the Prevention of Cruelty to Children (NSPCC).

== Sponsorships ==
Intel sponsors the Intel Extreme Masters, a series of international esports tournaments. It was also a sponsor of the Formula One teams BMW Sauber, Toyota, Caterham, and McLaren (since 2026). In 2013, Intel became a sponsor of FC Barcelona. In 2017, Intel became a sponsor of the Olympic Games, lasting from the 2018 Winter Olympics to the 2024 Summer Olympics. In 2024, Intel and Riot Games had an annual sponsorship valued at US$5 million, and one with JD Gaming for US$3.3 million. The company also had a sponsorship with Global Esports.

== Legal issues ==
=== Patent infringement litigation (2006–2007) ===
In October 2006, Transmeta filed a lawsuit against Intel for patent infringement on computer architecture and power efficiency technologies. The lawsuit was settled in October 2007, with Intel agreeing to pay US$150 million initially and US$20 million per year for the next five years. Both companies agreed to drop lawsuits against each other, while Intel was granted a perpetual non-exclusive license to use current and future patented Transmeta technologies in its chips for 10 years.

=== Antitrust allegations and litigation (2005–2023) ===
In September 2005, Intel filed a response to an AMD lawsuit, disputing AMD's claims, and claiming that Intel's business practices are fair and lawful. In a rebuttal, Intel deconstructed AMD's offensive strategy and argued that AMD struggled largely as a result of its own bad business decisions, including underinvestment in essential manufacturing capacity and excessive reliance on contracting to chip foundries. Legal analysts predicted the lawsuit would drag on for a number of years, since Intel's initial response indicated its unwillingness to settle with AMD. In 2008, a court date was finally set.

On November 4, 2009, New York's attorney general filed an antitrust lawsuit against Intel Corporation, claiming the company used "illegal threats and collusion" to dominate the market for computer microprocessors.

On November 12, 2009, AMD agreed to drop the antitrust lawsuit against Intel in exchange for $1.25 billion. A joint press release published by the two chip makers stated, "While the relationship between the two companies has been difficult in the past, this agreement ends the legal disputes and enables the companies to focus all of our efforts on product innovation and development."

An antitrust lawsuit and a class-action suit relating to cold calling employees of other companies was settled in 2014.

==== Allegations by Japan Fair Trade Commission (2005) ====
In 2005, the local Fair Trade Commission found that Intel violated the Japanese Antimonopoly Act. The commission ordered Intel to eliminate discounts that had discriminated against AMD. To avoid a trial, Intel agreed to comply with the order.

==== Allegations by regulators in South Korea (2007) ====
In September 2007, South Korean regulators accused Intel of breaking antitrust law. The investigation began in February 2006, when officials raided Intel's South Korean offices. The company risked a penalty of up to 3% of its annual sales if found guilty. In June 2008, the Fair Trade Commission ordered Intel to pay a fine of US$25.5 million for taking advantage of its dominant position to offer incentives to major Korean PC manufacturers on the condition of not buying products from AMD.

==== Allegations by regulators in the United States (2008–2010) ====
The state of New York started an investigation of Intel in January 2008 on whether the company violated antitrust laws in pricing and sales of its microprocessors. In June 2008, the U.S. Federal Trade Commission (FTC) also began an antitrust investigation of the case. In December 2009, the FTC announced it would initiate an administrative proceeding against Intel in September 2010.

In November 2009, following a two-year investigation, New York Attorney General Andrew Cuomo sued Intel, accusing it of bribery and coercion, claiming that Intel bribed computer makers to buy more of its chips than those of its rivals and threatened to withdraw these payments if the computer makers were perceived as working too closely with its competitors. Intel denied these claims.

On July 22, 2010, Dell agreed to a settlement with the U.S. Securities and Exchange Commission (SEC) to pay $100 million in penalties resulting from charges that Dell did not accurately disclose accounting information to investors. In particular, the SEC charged that from 2002 to 2006, Dell had an agreement with Intel to receive rebates in exchange for not using chips manufactured by AMD. These substantial rebates were not disclosed to investors, but were used to help meet investor expectations regarding the company's financial performance; "These exclusivity payments grew from 10% of Dell's operating income in FY 2003 to 38% in FY 2006, and peaked at 76% in the first quarter of FY 2007." Dell eventually did adopt AMD as a secondary supplier in 2006, and Intel subsequently stopped its rebates, causing Dell's financial performance to fall.

==== Allegations by the European Union (2007–2023) ====
In July 2007, the European Commission accused Intel of anti-competitive practices, mostly against AMD. The allegations, going back to 2003, include giving preferential prices to computer makers buying most or all of its chips from Intel, paying computer makers to delay or cancel the launch of products using AMD chips, and providing chips at below standard cost to governments and educational institutions. Intel responded that the allegations were unfounded and instead qualified its market behavior as consumer-friendly. General counsel Bruce Sewell responded that the commission had misunderstood some factual assumptions regarding pricing and manufacturing costs.

In February 2008, Intel announced that its office in Munich, Germany had been raided by European Union (EU) regulators. Intel reported that it was cooperating with investigators. Intel faced a fine of up to 10% of its annual revenue if found guilty of stifling competition. AMD subsequently launched a website promoting these allegations. In June 2008, the EU filed new charges against Intel. In May 2009, the EU found that Intel had engaged in anti-competitive practices and subsequently fined Intel €1.06 billion (US$1.44 billion), a record amount. Intel was found to have paid companies, including Acer, Dell, HP, Lenovo and NEC, to exclusively use Intel chips in their products, and therefore harmed other, less successful companies including AMD. The European Commission said that Intel had deliberately acted to keep competitors out of the computer chip market and in doing so had made a "serious and sustained violation of the EU's antitrust rules". In addition to the fine, Intel was ordered by the commission to immediately cease all illegal practices. Intel said they would appeal the commission's verdict. In June 2014, the General Court, which sits below the European Court of Justice, rejected the appeal.

In 2022 the €1.06 billion fine was dropped, but was successively re-imposed in September 2023 as a €376.36 million fine.

=== Corporate responsibility record ===
Intel has been accused by some residents of Rio Rancho, New Mexico, of allowing volatile organic compounds (VOCs) to be released in excess of its pollution permit. One resident claimed that a release of 1.4 tons of carbon tetrachloride was measured from one acid scrubber during the fourth quarter of 2003 but an emission factor allowed Intel to report no carbon tetrachloride emissions for all of 2003.

Another resident alleges that Intel was responsible for the release of other VOCs from its Rio Rancho site and that a necropsy of lung tissue from two deceased dogs in the area indicated trace amounts of toluene, hexane, ethylbenzene, and xylene isomers, all of which are solvents used in industrial settings but also commonly found in gasoline, retail paint thinners and retail solvents. During a sub-committee meeting of the New Mexico Environment Improvement Board, a resident claimed that Intel's own reports documented more than 1,580 pounds (720 kg) of VOCs were released in June and July 2006.

Intel's environmental performance is published annually in its corporate responsibility report.

==== Conflict-free production ====
In 2009, Intel announced that it planned to undertake an effort to remove conflict resources—materials sourced from mines whose profits are used to fund armed militant groups, particularly within the Democratic Republic of the Congo—from its supply chain. Intel sought conflict-free sources of the precious metals common to electronics from within the country, using a system of first- and third-party audits, as well as input from the Enough Project and other organizations. During a keynote address at the Consumer Electronics Show 2014, Intel CEO at the time, Brian Krzanich, announced that the company's microprocessors would henceforth be conflict free. In 2016, Intel stated that it had expected its entire supply chain to be conflict-free by the end of the year.

In its 2012 rankings on the progress of consumer electronics companies relating to conflict minerals, the Enough Project rated Intel the best of 24 companies, calling it a "Pioneer of progress". In 2014, chief executive Brian Krzanich urged the rest of the industry to follow Intel's lead by also shunning conflict minerals.

=== Age discrimination complaints ===
Intel has faced complaints of age discrimination in firing and layoffs. Intel was sued in 1993 by nine former employees, over allegations that they were laid off because they were over the age of 40.

A group called FACE Intel (Former and Current Employees of Intel) claims that Intel weeds out older employees. FACE Intel claims that more than 90% of people who have been laid off or fired from Intel are over the age of 40. Upside magazine requested data from Intel breaking out its hiring and firing by age, but the company declined to provide any. Intel has denied that age plays any role in Intel's employment practices. FACE Intel was founded by Ken Hamidi, who was fired from Intel in 1995 at the age of 47. Hamidi was blocked in a 1999 court decision from using Intel's email system to distribute criticism of the company to employees, which was overturned in 2003 in Intel Corp. v. Hamidi.

=== Tax dispute in India ===
In August 2016, Indian officials of the Bruhat Bengaluru Mahanagara Palike (BBMP) parked garbage trucks on Intel's campus and threatened to dump them for evading payment of property taxes between 2007 and 2008, to the tune of ₹340 million (US$3.6 million). Intel had reportedly been paying taxes as a non-air-conditioned office, when the campus in fact had central air conditioning. Other factors, such as land acquisition and construction improvements, added to the tax burden. Previously, Intel had appealed the demand in the Karnataka high court in July, during which the court ordered Intel to pay BBMP half the owed amount of ₹170 million (US$1.8 million) plus arrears by August 28 of that year.

=== Hardware instability lawsuit ===
In November 2024, a group of Intel customers who had purchased the company's Raptor Lake CPUs filed a class-action lawsuit against Intel, alleging that the company was aware of instability issues affecting 13th- and 14th-generation Raptor Lake CPUs that the company failed to disclose to customers.

== Product issues ==
=== Pentium FDIV bug ===
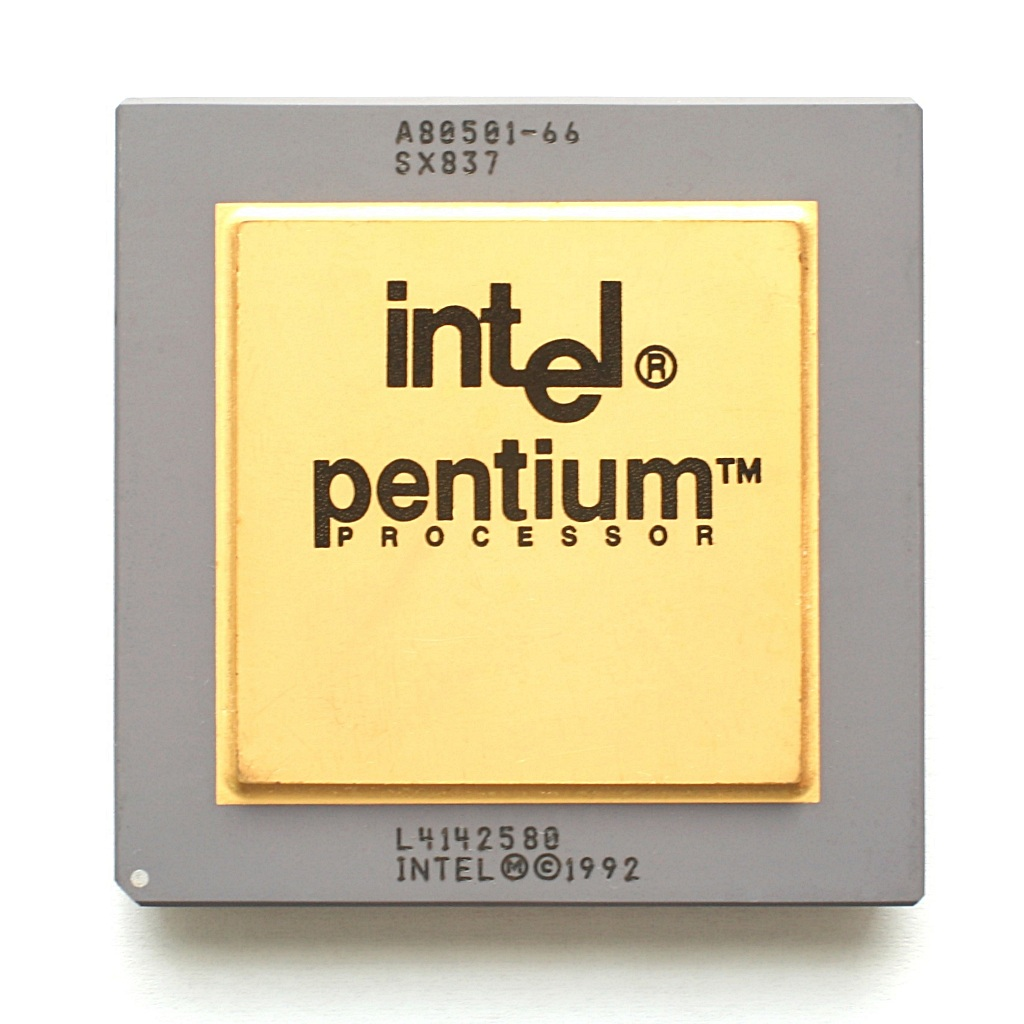
66 MHz Intel Pentium (sSpec=SX837) with the FDIV bug

The Pentium FDIV bug is a hardware bug affecting the floating-point unit (FPU) of the early Intel Pentium processors. Because of the bug, the processor would return incorrect binary floating point results when dividing certain pairs of high-precision numbers. The bug was discovered in 1994 by Thomas R. Nicely, a professor of mathematics at Lynchburg College. Missing values in a lookup table used by the FPU's floating-point division algorithm led to calculations acquiring small errors. In certain circumstances the errors can occur frequently and lead to significant deviations.

=== Transient execution CPU vulnerability ===
Transient execution CPU vulnerabilities are vulnerabilities in which instructions, most often optimized using speculative execution, are executed temporarily by a microprocessor, without committing their results due to a misprediction or error, resulting in leaking secret data to an unauthorized party. The archetype is Spectre, and transient execution attacks like Spectre belong to the cache-attack category, one of several categories of side-channel attacks. Since January 2018 many different cache-attack vulnerabilities have been identified.

=== Raptor Lake instability ===
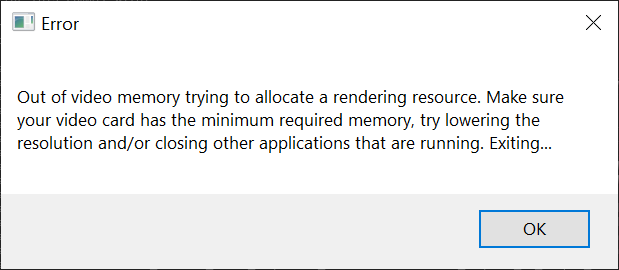
An example error message of a program crashing that occur on systems with the affected CPUs, which led to an initial assumption of it being an issue related to graphic cards or drivers

In February 2024, reports had begun surfacing of users of K-versions of the 13th- and 14th-generation Core i7 and i9 desktop CPUs commonly experiencing crashing issues in certain workload scenarios, such as video games that use DirectX 12, and HandBrake. The issue was initially attributed to GeForce graphics drivers; however, in a driver update published on April 13, 2024, Nvidia acknowledged the instability problem as being associated with the Intel 13th- and 14th-generation CPUs, and that owners of them should contact Intel customer support for further assistance. Some users and game developers worked around the problem by applying lower power limits, undervolting or underclocking the CPU. Similar failures in some 13th and 14th gen HX-version Intel laptop processors were reported, but were attributed to "common symptoms stemming from a broad range of potential software and hardware issues" by Intel.

== See also ==
- ASCI Red
- Bumpless Build-up Layer
- Comparison of Intel processors
- Cyrix
- Engineering sample
- Intel Developer Zone
- Intel GMA
- Intel Graphics Technology
- Intel Level Up
- Intel Management Engine
- Intel Museum
- Intel PRO/Wireless
- List of Intel chipsets
- List of Intel CPU microarchitectures
- List of Intel manufacturing sites
- List of mergers and acquisitions by Intel
- List of semiconductor fabrication plants
