= Process–architecture–optimization model =

CPU development model by Intel

Process–architecture–optimization is a development model for central processing units (CPUs) that Intel adopted in 2016. Under this three-phase (three-year) model, every microprocessor die shrink is followed by a microarchitecture change and then by one or more optimizations. It replaced the two-phase (two-year) tick–tock model that Intel adopted in 2006. The tick–tock model was no longer economically sustainable, according to Intel, because production of ever smaller dies becomes ever more costly.

== Roadmap ==
Wave	Process (die shrink)	Architecture	Optimizations					Optional backport
1: 14 nm	2014: Broadwell (5th gen)	2015: Skylake (6th gen)	2016: Kaby Lake (7th gen)	2017: Coffee Lake (8th gen)	2018: Coffee Lake Refresh (9th gen)	2019: Comet Lake (10th gen)	—N/a	2021: Rocket Lake (11th gen, Cypress Cove)
1: 14 nm	References:							
2: 10 nm (Intel 7)	2018: (Note: Cannon Lake: only 1 CPU released, microarchitecture dumped 1.5 year later.); Cannon Lake (8th gen, Palm Cove)	2019: Ice Lake (10th gen, Sunny Cove)	2020: Tiger Lake (11th gen, Willow Cove)	2021: Alder Lake (12th gen, Golden Cove)	2022: Raptor Lake (13th gen)	2023: Raptor Lake Refresh (14th gen)	2025: Raptor Lake Refresh (Core 200)	—N/a
2: 10 nm (Intel 7)	References:							
3: Intel 4 & Intel 3	2023: Meteor Lake (14th gen)	2025: Arrow Lake-U (Ultra 200U)						
3: Intel 4 & Intel 3	References:							
3: Intel 20A? & Intel 18A	2025: Panther Lake (Ultra 300)	2026?: Nova Lake (Ultra 400?)						
3: Intel 20A? & Intel 18A	References:							

== See also ==
- List of Intel CPU microarchitectures
- Tick–tock model
- Template:Intel processor roadmap
- Speculative execution CPU vulnerabilities

== Notes ==
Atom (ULV)		Node name	Pentium/Core						
Microarch.	Step	Node name	Microarch.	Step					
		600 nm	P6	Pentium Pro (133 MHz)					
		500 nm	P6	Pentium Pro (150 MHz)					
		350 nm	P6	Pentium Pro (166–200 MHz)					
		350 nm	P6	Klamath					
		250 nm	P6	Deschutes					
		250 nm	P6	Katmai	NetBurst				
		180 nm	P6	Coppermine	Willamette				
		130 nm	P6	Tualatin	Northwood				
		130 nm	Pentium M	Banias	Northwood		NetBurst(HT)		NetBurst(×2)
		90 nm	Pentium M	Dothan	Prescott	⇨	Prescott‑2M	⇨	Smithfield
		90 nm	Pentium M	Dothan	~~Tejas~~	→	⇩	→	~~Cedarmill (Tejas)~~
		65 nm	Pentium M	Yonah	~~Nehalem (NetBurst)~~		Cedar Mill	⇨	Presler
		65 nm	Core	Merom	4 cores on mainstream desktop, DDR3 introduced				
Bonnell	Bonnell	45 nm	Core	Penryn					
Bonnell	Bonnell	45 nm	Nehalem	Nehalem	HT reintroduced, integrated MC, PCH; L3-cache introduced, 256 KB L2-cache/core				
Bonnell	Saltwell	32 nm	Nehalem	Westmere	Introduced GPU on same package and AES-NI				
Bonnell	Saltwell	32 nm	Sandy Bridge	Sandy Bridge	On-die ring bus, no more non-UEFI motherboards				
Silvermont	Silvermont	22 nm	Sandy Bridge	Ivy Bridge					
Silvermont	Silvermont	22 nm	Haswell	Haswell	Fully integrated voltage regulator				
Silvermont	Airmont	14 nm	Haswell	Broadwell					
Silvermont	Airmont	14 nm	Skylake	Skylake	DDR4 introduced on mainstream desktop				
Goldmont	Goldmont	14 nm	Skylake	Kaby Lake					
Goldmont	Goldmont	14 nm	Skylake	Coffee Lake	6 cores on mainstream desktop				
Goldmont	Goldmont	14 nm	Skylake	Amber Lake	Mobile-only				
Goldmont Plus	Goldmont Plus	14 nm	Skylake	Whiskey Lake	Mobile-only				
Goldmont Plus	Goldmont Plus	14 nm	Skylake	Coffee Lake Refresh	8 cores on mainstream desktop				
Goldmont Plus	Goldmont Plus	14 nm	Skylake	Comet Lake	10 cores on mainstream desktop				
Goldmont Plus	Goldmont Plus	14 nm	Sunny Cove	Cypress Cove (Rocket Lake)	Backported Sunny Cove microarchitecture for 14 nm				
Tremont	Tremont	10 nm	Skylake	Palm Cove (Cannon Lake)	Mobile-only				
Tremont	Tremont	10 nm	Sunny Cove	Sunny Cove (Ice Lake)	512 KB L2-cache/core				
Tremont	Tremont	10 nm	Sunny Cove	Willow Cove (Tiger Lake)	X^{e} graphics engine				
Gracemont	Gracemont	Intel 7 (10 nm ESF)	Golden Cove	Golden Cove (Alder Lake)	Hybrid, DDR5, PCIe 5.0				
Gracemont	Gracemont	Intel 7 (10 nm ESF)	Golden Cove	Raptor Cove (Raptor Lake)					
Crestmont	Crestmont	Intel 4	Redwood Cove	Meteor Lake	Mobile-only; NPU, chiplet architecture				
Crestmont	Crestmont	Intel 3	Redwood Cove	Arrow Lake-U					
Skymont	Skymont	N3B (TSMC)	Lion Cove	Lunar Lake	Low power mobile only (9–30 W)				
Skymont	Skymont	N3B (TSMC)	Lion Cove	Arrow Lake					
Darkmont	Darkmont	Intel 18A	Cougar Cove	Panther Lake					
Arctic Wolf	Arctic Wolf	Intel 18A	Coyote Cove	Nova Lake					
