= Sean Maloney (technology) =

American business executive (born 1956)

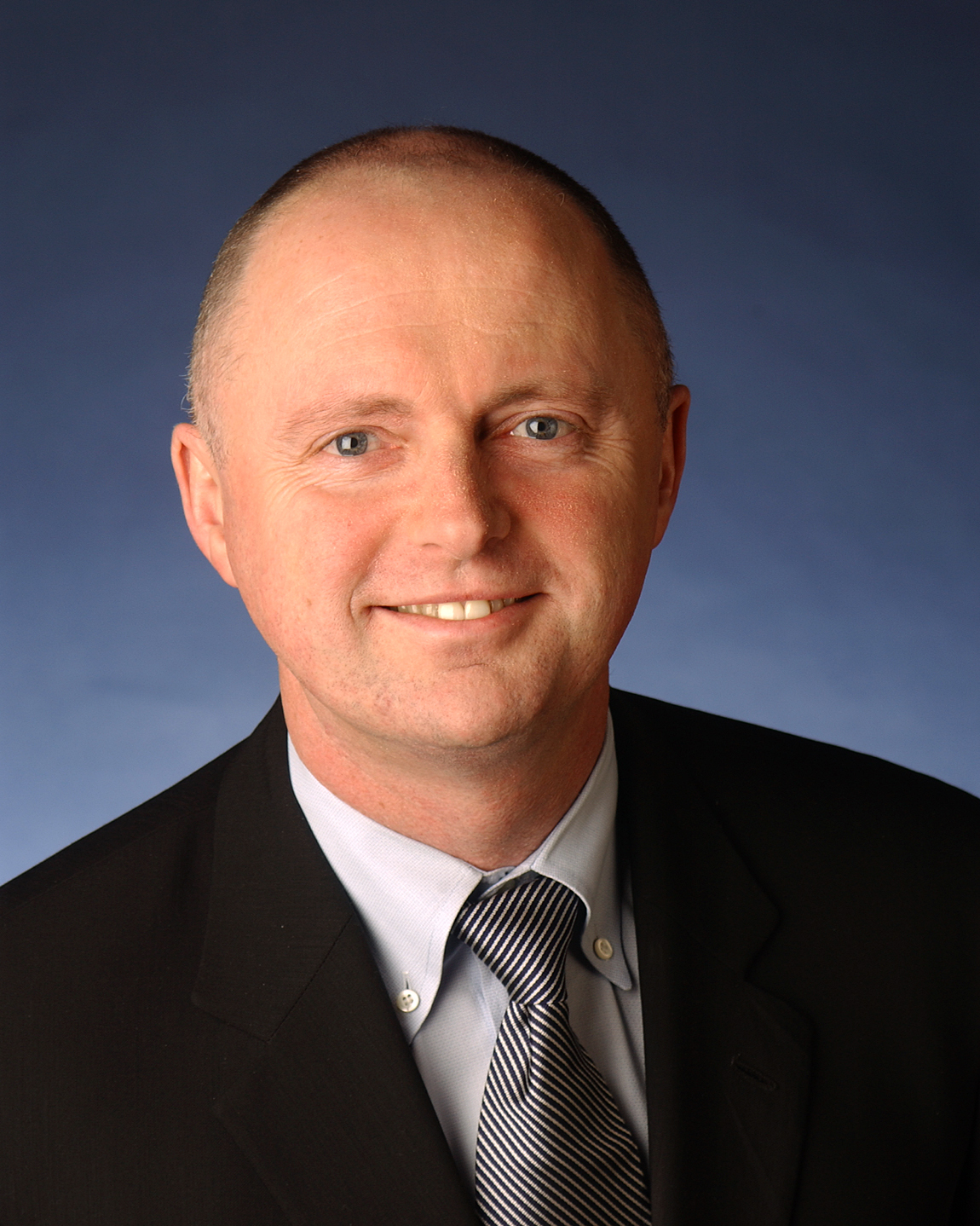
- Maloney in 2004
- Born: July 5, 1956 (age 70); London, United Kingdom
- Education: Thames Polytechnic (dropped out)
- Occupation: Business executive
- Known for: former chairman of Intel China
- Children: 5

Sean M. Maloney (born July 5, 1956) is an American tech executive and former chairman of Intel China. Currently he serves on the boards of the Silicon Valley branch of the American Heart Association and Netronome. He is the former executive vice president of Intel Corporation, general manager of the Sales and Marketing Group, and chief sales and marketing officer. He joined Intel in 1982 and after 30 years at the company, announced his plans to retire on September 19, 2012.

Maloney worked directly under former CEO Andrew Grove and spent several years working in European and Asian markets. He was one of four executive vice presidents reporting to the then CEO, Paul Otellini, and many industry insiders considered him a contender to take the top job.

Maloney led Intel's WiMAX participation and investment as well as the company's push into supporting mobile computing. In 2006 Maloney received the Lee De Forest Award from the Radio Club of America for his role in the creation of the WiMAX industry. Maloney also received an honorary doctorate degree from the University of Southern Connecticut.

In February 2010, the Intel executive had a stroke which left him virtually speechless and significantly impaired the use of his right arm. Determined to recover, Maloney, an avid rower, embraced the hobby and returned to a leadership role at the company within the year.

In May 2011, Maloney was appointed Chairman of Intel China by Otellini, and moved to Beijing. In June 2011, Maloney addressed Computex and unveiled the Ultrabook computer category. In April 2012, Maloney gave the keynote at Intel's Developer Forum in Beijing.

In 2014, Maloney was appointed Chairman of the Silicon Valley American Heart Association Board of Directors. As the organization's chair, Maloney is leading efforts to raise funds for research and awareness.

In March 2015, Maloney rode his bicycle across America from San Francisco to New York to raise awareness about stroke, and to raise funds for the American Heart Association.

Maloney is married to former PR executive and novelist Margaret Chai Maloney. The couple has five children.
