= Engineering sample =

Integrated circuit prototypes for testing

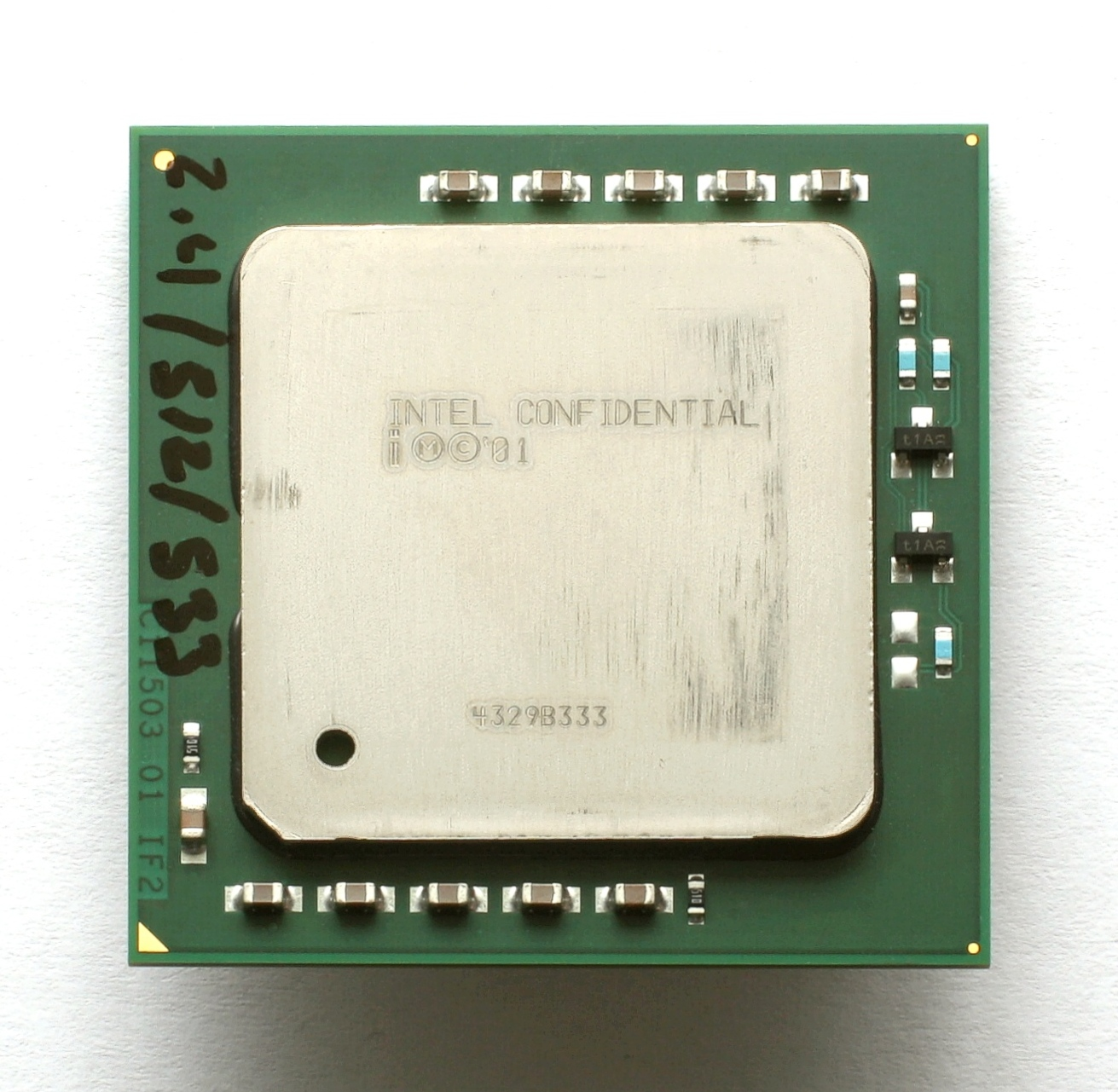
An Intel Xeon "Prestonia" engineering sample

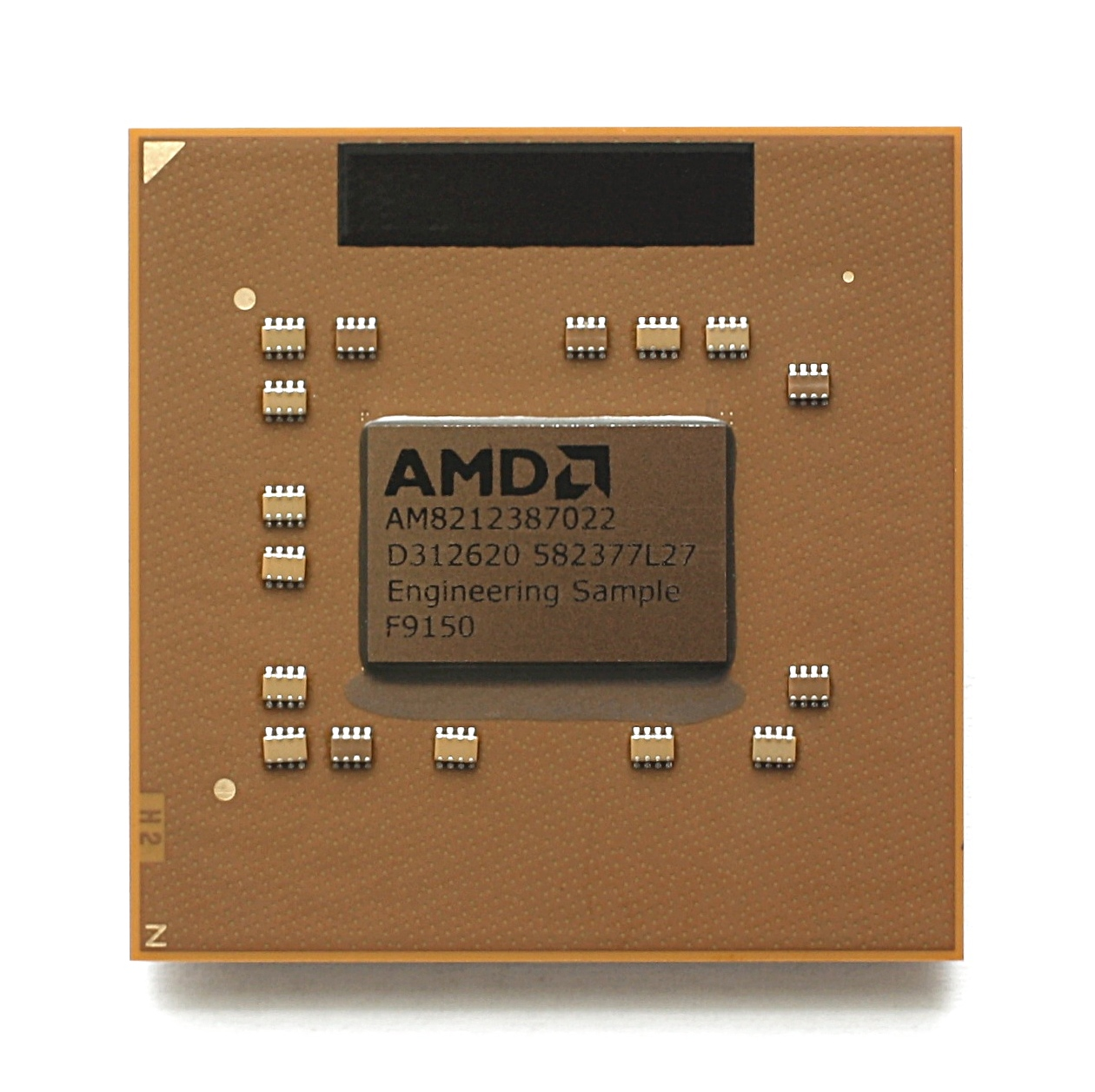
An AMD Mobile Athlon XP engineering sample

Engineering samples are the beta versions of integrated circuits which are loaned to ODMs, OEMs and ISVs so that products can be tested prior to launch. Engineering samples are usually handed out under a non-disclosure agreement or another type of confidentiality agreement.

Several kinds of preproduction samples are made during a product's development, ranging from mechanical samples (for testing physical fit of a processor), electrical/thermal samples (for testing cooling and power draw), engineering samples (for early testing of a design) and qualification samples (made to test whether a design is ready for release). Some engineering samples with unlocked clock multipliers are valued by overclockers. Intel does not officially acknowledge a distinction between engineering and qualification samples.

Some engineering samples, such as Pentium 4 processors, were rare and favoured for having unlocked base-clock multipliers. Since 2008, Core 2 engineering samples have become more common and popular.

While engineering sample CPUs do occasionally appear on secondhand markets such as eBay, they are generally not authorized for resale and can suffer from unpredictable performance issues, compatibility issues, and lack of warranty support options. This is due to their unfinished nature compared to the retail version of the chip.
