= Arrow Lake (microprocessor) =

2024 Intel product line

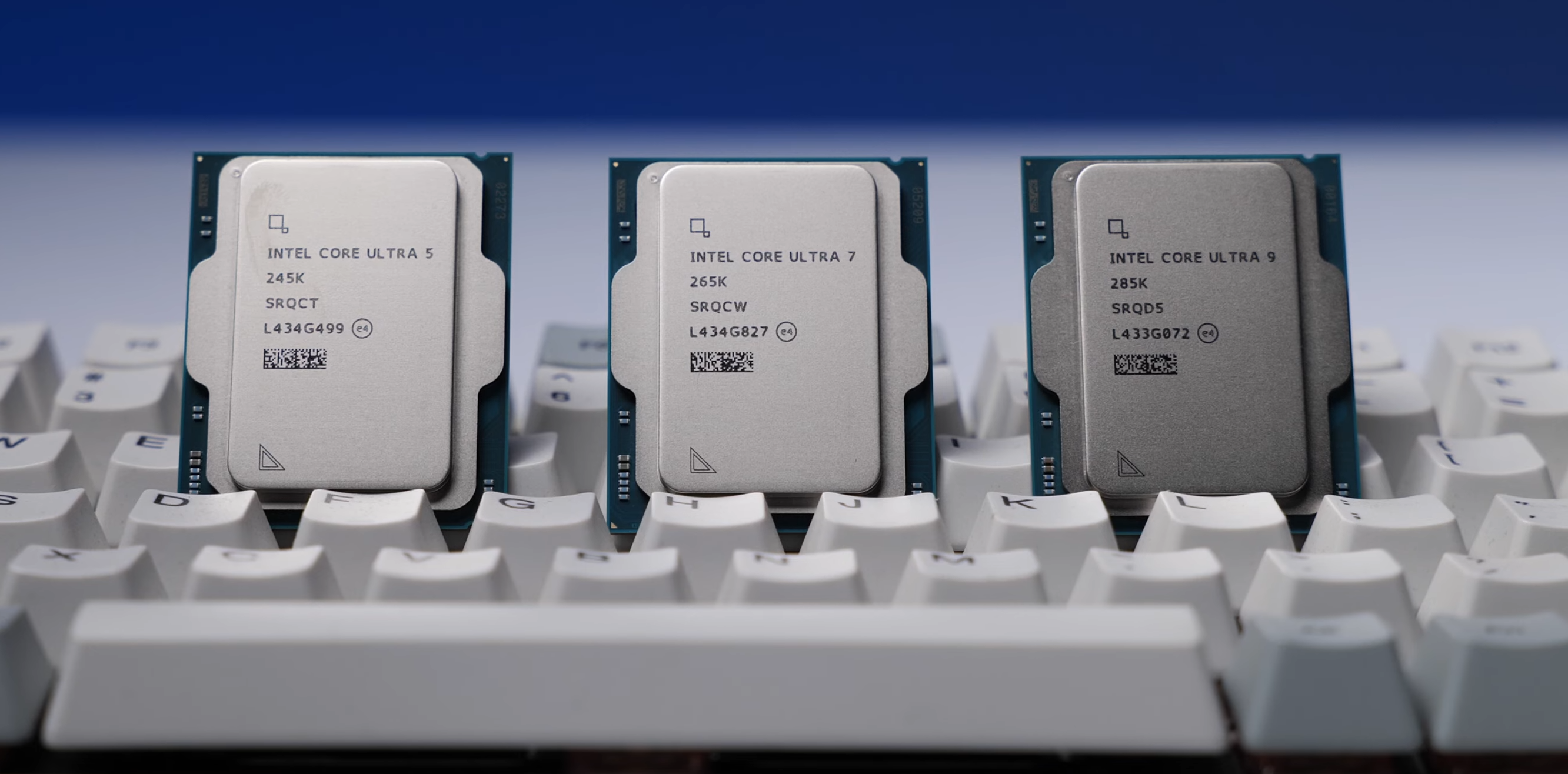
- Three Arrow Lake-S desktop processors
- Launched: October 24, 2024
- Designed by: Intel
- Manufactured by: Intel; TSMC
- Fabrication process: TSMC N3B; TSMC N5P; TSMC N6
- Codename(s): ARL
- Platform(s): Desktop; Mobile

Branding
- Brand name(s): Core Ultra
- Generation: Series 2
- Socket(s): LGA 1851; BGA 2114

Instructions and architecture
- Instructions set: x86-64
- Instructions: x86 (IA-32, x86-64)
- Extensions: AES-NI, CLMUL, SM3, SM4, SHA, TXT, RDRAND, MMX, SSE, SSE2, SSE3, SSSE3, SSE4, SSE4.1, SSE4.2, AVX, AVX2, FMA3, AVX-VNNI, AVX-IFMA, VT-x, VT-d
- P-core architecture: Lion Cove
- E-core architecture: Skymont

Cores
- Peak core clock: Up to 5.7 GHz
- P-core L0 cache: 48 KB data (per core)
- P-core L1 cache: 256 KB (per core): 64 KB instructions; 192 KB data
- E-core L1 cache: 96 KB (per core): 64 KB instructions; 32 KB data
- P-core L2 cache: 3 MB (per core)
- E-core L2 cache: 4 MB (per cluster)
- L3 cache: Up to 36 MB (globally shared)

Graphics
- Graphics architecture: X^{e}-LPG; X^{e}-LPG+
- Execution units: Up to 64 EUs
- X^{e} cores: Up to 8 X^{e} Cores
- Peak graphics clock: 2.0 GHz

NPU
- Architecture: NPU 3720
- TOPS: 13

Memory support
- Type: DDR5-6400
- Memory channels: 2 channels
- Maximum capacity: 256 GB

I/O
- PCIe support: PCIe 5.0
- PCIe lanes: 20 PCIe 5.0 lanes 4 PCIe 4.0 lanes
- DMI version: DMI 4.0 x8

History
- Predecessor: Meteor Lake (mobile); Raptor Lake (desktop and mobile)
- Variant: Lunar Lake
- Successor: Panther Lake (mobile); Nova Lake (desktop and mobile)

Arrow Lake is the codename for Core Ultra Series 2 processors designed by Intel, released on October 24, 2024. It follows on from Meteor Lake which saw Intel move from monolithic silicon to a disaggregated multi-chip module design. Meteor Lake was limited to a mobile release while Arrow Lake includes both socketable desktop processors and mainstream and enthusiast mobile processors. Core Ultra 200H and 200HX series mobile processors followed in early 2025. Arrow Lake desktop CPUs integrated Thunderbolt 4 and USB4 support in the CPU, which allowed it to not be limited by PCIe 3.0 speeds and use simple re-timers instead. The chipset has the same maximum five integrated USB 3.2 2×2, and is Thunderbolt 5 ready if a discrete board is used. The integrated GPU added HDMI 2.1 FRL 48 Gbit/s (also in Meteor Lake) and variable refresh rate (VRR) support. CU-DIMM DDR5 memory support was added and is needed for optimal performance.

== Background ==
The first official mention of Arrow Lake came on February 17, 2022 at Intel's Investor Meeting where it was confirmed that Arrow Lake would be the successor to Meteor Lake. Arrow Lake was confirmed to use a disaggregated construction and would be fabricated on Intel's 20A node and external nodes.

In September 2023, Intel CEO Pat Gelsinger showcased a 20A wafer at Intel's Innovation event containing Arrow Lake test dies, reiterating that Arrow Lake products were on schedule. On December 14, 2023, Meteor Lake launched in 9 W and 15 W form factors for premium notebooks, followed by 15 W Raptor Lake-U Refresh for entry-level laptops on January 9, 2024, at CES.

Also, at CES 2024, Intel stated that Arrow Lake would launch for desktop in the second half of 2024. Intel claimed that Arrow Lake would be the "world's first gaming processor with an AI accelerator" despite AMD's Ryzen 8000G desktop APUs, codenamed "Phoenix-G", with a dedicated XDNA AI engine launching first in January 2024. On May 20, 2024, Intel reaffirmed that Arrow Lake was on track for a Q4 2024 release with an update promised at Computex in the following weeks. On June 4, 2024, Intel shared details on the Lion Cove P-cores and Skymont E-core architectures that are shared between Arrow Lake and Lunar Lake.

Arrow Lake-S desktop processors were announced on October 10, 2024 with an October 24 release date.

== Architecture ==
Arrow Lake is a two-way x86 architecture designed to scale from 28W mobile form factors to 125 W enthusiast desktop segments. The architectural construction behind Arrow Lake maintains many of the direct elements from Meteor Lake. It is a disaggregated MCM design fabricated on various nodes from TSMC. Arrow Lake reuses the same SoC and I/O extender tiles from Meteor Lake while adding a new compute tile and a smaller graphics tile intended for desktop.

=== Process node ===
Tile	Node	EUV	Die size	Ref.
Compute tile	TSMC N3B	Yes	117.241 mm^{2}	
Graphics tile	TSMC N5P	Yes	23 mm^{2}	
SoC tile	TSMC N6	Yes	86.648 mm^{2}	
I/O extender tile	TSMC N6	Yes	24.475 mm^{2}	
Foveros interposer base tile	Intel 16 (22FFL) (Note: Intel 16 is built on their previous 22FFL process.)	No	302.944 mm^{2}	

=== Compute tile ===
The previous generation Meteor Lake used the Intel 4 process on its compute tile with Arrow Lake originally planning to move to Intel's 20A node. In September 2024, Intel announced the cancellation of its 20A node so it could shift its focus to the development of 18A instead. Intel's 20A node planned to introduce gate-all-around (GAA) transistors, which Intel refers to as RibbonFET, and those transistors receive backside power delivery that Intel calls PowerVia. RibbonFET is Intel's first new transistor design since the introduction of FinFET in 2011. Arrow Lake's compute tile is fabricated on TSMC's N3B node instead of 20A. Similar to what the previous generation Meteor Lake did, Arrow Lake's compute tile introduces both new Lion Cove P-cores and new Skymont E-cores. Arrow Lake's Lion Cove and Skymont core architectures are also shared with Lunar Lake.

==== Lion Cove ====
Lion Cove P-cores features wider decoder and dispatch engines, a greater number of integers ALUs, larger L2 caches, and a redesigned cache hierarchy. Intel claims a 9% IPC (instructions per cycle) improvement for Arrow Lake's Lion Cove cores. Lion Cove in Arrow Lake has an increased 3 MB of L2 cache compared to 2.5 MB in Lunar Lake's Lion Cove implementation. Lion Cove's L2 cache is 50% larger over the previous generation Raptor Cove core with 2 MB of L2 cache. Lion Cove has an L2 bandwidth of 32 bytes per cycle. Lion Cove P-cores include support for AVX-512 instructions but AVX-512 has been disabled in Arrow Lake processors due to its heterogeneous architecture. The Skymont E-cores do not feature AVX-512 instructions support so AVX-512 is disabled to ensure that both core types are equal in their capabilities.

There has been a clock speed regression for Lion Cove P-cores in Arrow Lake-S desktop processors. The Core Ultra 9 285K has a peak clock speed of 5.7 GHz compared to the higher 6.2 GHz clock speed of the Raptor Lake Core i9-14900KS. One of key features introduced in Lion Cove was the ability to have 3 multiplications per cycle (assuming they are independent of course).

===== Simultaneous multithreading (SMT) =====
Simultaneous multithreading (SMT) has been removed from Arrow Lake's Lion Cove P-cores. SMT first made its debut in an Intel desktop processor with the Northwood-based Pentium 4 in November 2002. Its removal in Arrow Lake marks the second time since then that SMT has been completely removed from a new x86-64 Intel performance-oriented core architecture rather than it simply being disabled in some lower-end Celeron and Pentium SKUs. (Note: SMT was physically present in previous Intel core architectures like Sandy Bridge, Haswell and Skylake but it was disabled in some lower-end Celeron and Pentium SKUs. For example, Coffee Lake's Skylake cores contained SMT but it was disabled in the Core i7-9700K with 8 cores and 8 threads while the Core i9-9900K had 8 cores and 16 threads.) SMT, or Intel's marketing term HyperThreading, allows a single physical CPU core with two threads to execute two tasks simultaneously. In the early 2000s, SMT was a way to add more processing threads to single-core CPUs while not using too much die space. The removal of SMT allows the physical core die area to be reduced. Increasing the number of processing threads with a greater number of physical cores can compensate for the removal of SMT providing two threads per core. Many ARM-based processors, such as Apple's M series System on a chip (SoCs), do not feature SMT as it is less beneficial on processors with a short processor pipeline and including it increases the physical core area. With a longer processor pipeline, like the one used by Intel, it is more difficult to keep the CPU cores fed with useful data in a workload. Cores with longer pipelines are able to support high clock speeds but with fewer instructions per clock (IPC). Further, Intel argued SMT was not needed with the additional cores offered in Arrow Lake and related hybrid designs with greater numbers of P and E cores, and reduced power and transistor requirements.

==== Skymont ====
Skymont E-cores focus on enhanced branch prediction and instruction fetch, increased throughput for 128-bit floating-point and SIMD vector data types, and their L2 cache receiving a doubling in bandwidth. Intel claims a 32% IPC uplift in multi-threaded integer workloads compared to Gracemont and 55% in multi-threaded floating point.

==== Core layout ====
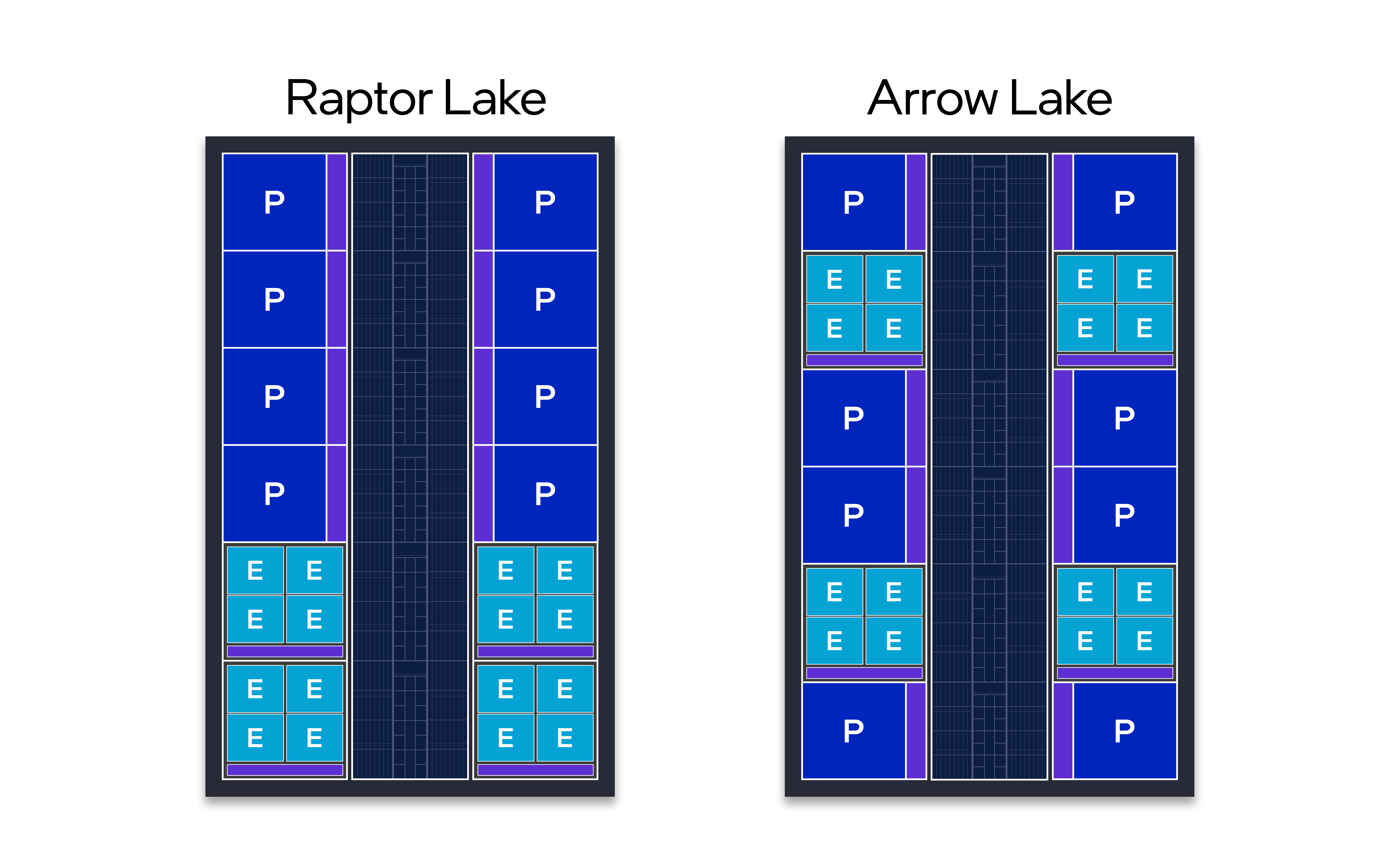

The physical layout of P-cores and E-cores has changed in Arrow Lake with a cluster of four E-cores placed between two P-cores. In contrast, Alder Lake, Raptor Lake, and Meteor Lake placed all P-cores together in one group and all E-cores together in another which reduces core-to-core latency when moving instructions or data between the P-cores and E-cores. The previous approach required data to travel a longer distance along the ring bus between both core types. The new approach also helps to alleviate some of thermal issues of Raptor Lake, as the heat from the high-powered P-cores is more spread out, allowing for easier cooling.

=== Graphics tile ===
Arrow Lake's graphics tile remains largely unchanged architecturally from Meteor Lake. Just like Meteor Lake, the graphics tile in Arrow Lake is fabricated on TSMC's N5P node. Arrow Lake-S desktop processors feature 4 X^{e}-LPG cores based on the Alchemist graphics architecture. However, Arrow Lake mobile processors feature up to 8 slightly modified X^{e}-LPG+ (Gen12.74) cores which add support for Dot Product Accumulate Systolic (DPAS) instructions. DPAS instructions were included in X^{e}-HPG cores for discrete Arc graphics but were disabled in the lower power X^{e}-LPG variant. DPAS instructions allow FP16, BF16 and INT4 data types to be multiplied, giving the GPU the ability to perform more operations per cycle.

=== SoC tile ===
Arrow Lake reuses the same SoC tile design from Meteor Lake, fabricated on TSMC's N6 node. The SoC tile used for Arrow Lake-S desktop processors was originally designed for cancelled Meteor Lake-S processors for desktop. It does not contain any low power E-cores. Mobile variants of Arrow Lake reuse Meteor Lake's SoC tile that includes two Crestmont low-power E-cores, which are different to the Skymont E-cores in the CPU compute tile. The Crestmont low-power E-cores do not have an L3 cache like the Skymont E-cores do in the CPU tile.

== NPU ==
Arrow Lake uses the same Neural Processing Unit (NPU) as found in Meteor Lake that provides 13 TOPS of INT8 rather than the 45 TOPS NPU 4 found in Lunar Lake. For comparison, Ryzen 8000G desktop APUs have an XDNA-based NPU capable of 16 TOPS. Across the NPU, CPU and integrated GPU, Intel advertises Core Ultra 200S CPUs to hit 36 overall TOPS, while AMD's Ryzen 8000G desktop APUs are capable of delivering a theoretical 39 TOPS of AI performance.

=== Memory controller ===
Arrow Lake is Intel's first desktop architecture to feature DDR5 memory support exclusively with support for DDR4 being removed. Alder Lake and Raptor Lake supported both DDR4 and DDR5 memory. Arrow Lake-S desktop processors support the same DDR5-5600 UDIMM speeds as Raptor Lake but Arrow Lake has added support for Clock Unbuffered DIMM (CUDIMM) and Clock Small Outline DIMM (CSODIMM) memory. CUDIMMs add a clock driver to traditional unbuffered DIMMs that is able to regenerate the clock signal locally on the DIMM for better stability at high memory speeds. With CUDIMMs and motherboard support, Arrow Lake is able to run overclocked DDR5-10000. At Computex in June 2024, ASRock showed a LGA 1851 socket motherboard with CAMM2 memory slots.

Arrow Lake-S officially supported DDR5 speeds
		Memory clock (MT/s)	
		1DPC	2DPC
UDIMM	1R	5600	4800
UDIMM	2R		4400
SODIMM	1R	5600	5600
SODIMM	2R		
CUDIMM	1R	6400	4800
CUDIMM	2R		4400
CSODIMM	1R	6400	
CSODIMM	2R		

== List of Arrow Lake processors ==
Each Xe core on the integrated GPU contains 16 vector engines (VEs) and one ray-tracing unit.

=== Desktop ===
==== Arrow Lake-S ====
CPUs underlined support Intel vPro with the Q870 (enterprise) and W880 (entry-level workstation) chipsets, and ECC memory only on the W880 chipset.

Branding	SKU	Cores (threads)		Clock rate (GHz)				Arc Graphics		NPU (TOPS)	Cache				Power		Released	Price (USD)
Branding	SKU	Cores (threads)		Base		Turbo		Arc Graphics		NPU (TOPS)	Cache				Power		Released	Price (USD)
Branding	SKU	P	E	P	E	P	E	X^{e} Cores (VE:RT)	Clock (GHz)	NPU (TOPS)	L0	L1	L2	L3	Base	Turbo	Released	Price (USD)
Core Ultra 9	285K	8 (8)	16 (16)	3.7	3.2	5.7	4.6	4 (64:4)	2.0	36	2.6 MB	3 MB	40 MB	36 MB	125 W	250 W	Oct 24, 2024	$589
Core Ultra 9	285	8 (8)	16 (16)	2.5	1.9	5.4	4.6	4 (64:4)	2.0	36	2.6 MB	3 MB	40 MB	36 MB	65 W	182 W	Jan 6, 2025	$549
Core Ultra 9	285T	8 (8)	16 (16)	1.4	1.2	5.3	4.6	4 (64:4)	2.0	35	2.6 MB	3 MB	40 MB	36 MB	35 W	112 W	Jan 6, 2025	$549
Core Ultra 7	265K	8 (8)	12 (12)	3.9	3.3	5.5	4.6	4 (64:4)	2.0	33	2.2 MB	2.7 MB	36 MB	30 MB	125 W	250 W	Oct 24, 2024	$394
Core Ultra 7	265KF	8 (8)	12 (12)	3.9	3.3	5.5	4.6	—N/a		25	2.2 MB	2.7 MB	36 MB	30 MB	125 W	250 W	Oct 24, 2024	$379
Core Ultra 7	265	8 (8)	12 (12)	2.4	1.8	5.2	4.6	4 (64:4)	1.95	33	2.2 MB	2.7 MB	36 MB	30 MB	65 W	182 W	Jan 6, 2025	$384
Core Ultra 7	265F	8 (8)	12 (12)	2.4	1.8	5.2	4.6	—N/a		25	2.2 MB	2.7 MB	36 MB	30 MB	65 W	182 W	Jan 6, 2025	$369
Core Ultra 7	265T	8 (8)	12 (12)	1.5	1.2	5.2	4.6	4 (64:4)	1.95	33	2.2 MB	2.7 MB	36 MB	30 MB	35 W	112 W	Jan 6, 2025	$384
Core Ultra 5	245K	6 (6)	8 (8)	4.2	3.6	5.2	4.6	4 (64:4)	1.9	30	1.5 MB	1.9 MB	26 MB	24 MB	125 W	159 W	Oct 24, 2024	$309
Core Ultra 5	245KF	6 (6)	8 (8)	4.2	3.6	5.2	4.6	—N/a		22	1.5 MB	1.9 MB	26 MB	24 MB	125 W	159 W	Oct 24, 2024	$294
Core Ultra 5	245	6 (6)	8 (8)	3.5	3.0	5.1	4.5	4 (64:4)	1.9	29	1.5 MB	1.9 MB	26 MB	24 MB	65 W	121 W	Jan 6, 2025	$270
Core Ultra 5	245T	6 (6)	8 (8)	2.2	1.7	5.1	4.5	4 (64:4)	1.9	29	1.5 MB	1.9 MB	26 MB	24 MB	35 W	114 W	Jan 6, 2025	$270
Core Ultra 5	235	6 (6)	8 (8)	3.4	2.9	5.0	4.4	3 (48:3)	2.0	27	1.5 MB	1.9 MB	26 MB	24 MB	65 W	121 W	Jan 6, 2025	$247
Core Ultra 5	235T	6 (6)	8 (8)	2.2	1.6	5.0	4.4	3 (48:3)	2.0	27	1.5 MB	1.9 MB	26 MB	24 MB	35 W	114 W	Jan 6, 2025	$247
Core Ultra 5	225	6 (6)	4 (4)	3.3	2.7	4.9	4.4	2 (32:2)	1.8	23	1.1 MB	1.5 MB	22 MB	20 MB	65 W	121 W	Jan 6, 2025	$236
Core Ultra 5	225F	6 (6)	4 (4)	3.3	2.7	4.9	4.4	—N/a		19	1.1 MB	1.5 MB	22 MB	20 MB	65 W	121 W	Jan 6, 2025	$221
Core Ultra 5	225T	6 (6)	4 (4)	2.5	1.9	4.9	4.4	2 (32:2)	1.8	23	1.1 MB	1.5 MB	22 MB	20 MB	35 W	114 W	Jan 6, 2025	$236
Core Ultra 3	205	4 (4)	4 (4)	3.8	3.2	4.9	4.4	2 (32:2)	1.8	13	896 KB	1.5 MB	16 MB	15 MB	57 W	76 W	Aug, 2025	$130-$150 (Europe Only)
Core Ultra 3	205T	4 (4)	4 (4)	2.7	2.4	4.9	4.4	2 (32:2)	?	13	896 KB	1.5 MB	16 MB	15 MB	35 W	?	?	?

=== Mobile ===
==== Arrow Lake-U ====
Arrow Lake-U uses refreshed Meteor Lake silicon fabricated on the Intel 3 node, and as such still supports HyperThreading while the rest of the Arrow Lake product line does not.

Branding	SKU	Cores (threads)			Clock rate (GHz)						Arc Graphics		NPU (TOPS)	Cache				Power		Released	Price (USD)
Branding	SKU	Cores (threads)			Base			Turbo			Arc Graphics		NPU (TOPS)	Cache				Power		Released	Price (USD)
Branding	SKU	P	E	LP-E	P	E	LP-E	P	E	LP-E	X^{e} Cores (VE:RT)	Clock (GHz)	NPU (TOPS)	L0	L1	L2	L3	Base	Turbo	Released	Price (USD)
Core Ultra 7	265U	2 (4)	8 (8)	2 (2)	2.1	1.7	0.7	5.3	4.2	2.4	4 (64:4)	2.1	12	96 KB	1.3 MB	14 MB	12 MB	15 W	57 W	Jan 6, 2025	$448
Core Ultra 7	255U	2 (4)	8 (8)	2 (2)	2.0	1.7	0.7	5.2	4.2	2.4	4 (64:4)	2.1	12	96 KB	1.3 MB	14 MB	12 MB	15 W	57 W	Jan 6, 2025	$490
Core Ultra 5	235U	2 (4)	8 (8)	2 (2)	2.0	1.5	0.7	4.9	4.1	2.4	4 (64:4)	2.05	12	96 KB	1.3 MB	14 MB	12 MB	15 W	57 W	Jan 6, 2025	$332
Core Ultra 5	225U	2 (4)	8 (8)	2 (2)	1.5	1.8	0.7	4.8	3.8	2.4	4 (64:4)	2.0	12	96 KB	1.3 MB	14 MB	12 MB	15 W	57 W	Jan 6, 2025	$363

==== Arrow Lake-H ====
CPUs underlined support Intel vPro.

Branding	SKU	Cores (threads)			Clock rate (GHz)						Arc Graphics		NPU (TOPS)	Cache		TDP		Released	Price (USD) (Note: Price is Recommended Customer Price (RCP) at launch. RCP is the trade price that processors are sold by Intel to retailers and OEMs. Actual MSRP for consumers is higher.)
Branding	SKU	Cores (threads)			Base			Turbo			Arc Graphics		NPU (TOPS)	Cache		TDP		Released	Price (USD)
Branding	SKU	P	E	LP-E	P	E	LP-E	P	E	LP-E	X^{e} Cores (VE:RT)	Clock (GHz)	NPU (TOPS)	L2	L3	Base	Turbo	Released	Price (USD)
Core Ultra 9	285H	6 (6)	8 (8)	2 (2)	2.9	2.7	1.0	5.4	4.5	2.5	8 (128:8)	2.35	13	26 MB	24 MB	45 W	115 W	Jan 6, 2025	$651
Core Ultra 7	265H	6 (6)	8 (8)	2 (2)	2.2	1.7	0.7	5.3	4.5	2.5	8 (128:8)	2.3	13	26 MB	24 MB	28 W	115 W	Jan 6, 2025	$471
Core Ultra 7	255H	6 (6)	8 (8)	2 (2)	2.0	1.5	0.7	5.1	4.4	2.5	8 (128:8)	2.25	13	26 MB	24 MB	28 W	115 W	Jan 6, 2025	$514
Core Ultra 5	235H	4 (4)	8 (8)	2 (2)	2.4	1.8	0.7	5	4.4	2.5	8 (128:8)	2.25	13	20 MB	18 MB	28 W	115 W	Jan 6, 2025	$354
Core Ultra 5	225H	4 (4)	8 (8)	2 (2)	1.7	1.3	0.7	4.9	4.3	2.5	7 (112:7)	2.2	13	20 MB	18 MB	28 W	115 W	Jan 6, 2025	$385

==== Arrow Lake-HX ====
CPUs underlined support Intel vPro, and UDIMM ECC memory with the WM880 chipset, intended for desktop replacement-class mobile workstations.

Branding	SKU	Cores (threads)		Clock rate (GHz)				Arc Graphics		NPU (TOPS)	Cache		TDP		Released	Price (USD)
Branding	SKU	Cores (threads)		Base		Turbo		Arc Graphics		NPU (TOPS)	Cache		TDP		Released	Price (USD)
Branding	SKU	P	E	P	E	P	E	X^{e} Cores (VE:RT)	Clock (GHz)	NPU (TOPS)	L2	L3	Base	Turbo	Released	Price (USD)
Core Ultra 9	285HX	8 (8)	16 (16)	2.8	2.1	5.5	4.6	4 (64:4)	2.0	13	40 MB	36 MB	55 W	160 W	Jan 6, 2025	$680
Core Ultra 9	275HX	8 (8)	16 (16)	2.7	2.1	5.4	4.6	4 (64:4)	1.9	13	40 MB	36 MB	55 W	160 W	Jan 6, 2025	$612
Core Ultra 7	265HX	8 (8)	12 (12)	2.6	2.3	5.3	4.6	4 (64:4)	1.9	13	36 MB	30 MB	55 W	160 W	Jan 6, 2025	$450
Core Ultra 7	255HX	8 (8)	12 (12)	2.4	1.8	5.2	4.5	4 (64:4)	1.85	13	36 MB	30 MB	55 W	160 W	Jan 6, 2025	$507
Core Ultra 7	251HX	6 (6)	12 (12)	2.9	2.5	5.1	4.5	3 (48:3)	1.8	13	30 MB	30 MB	55 W	160 W	Q1 2026	
Core 7	245HX	6 (6)	8 (8)	2.9	2.6	5.1	4.5	3 (48:3)	1.8	13	26 MB	24 MB	55 W	160 W	Q1 2026	
Core Ultra 5	245HX	6 (6)	8 (8)	3.1	2.6	5.1	4.5	3 (48:3)	1.9	13	26 MB	24 MB	55 W	160 W	Jan 6, 2025	$306
Core Ultra 5	235HX	6 (6)	8 (8)	2.9	2.6	5.1	4.5	3 (48:3)	1.8	13	26 MB	24 MB	55 W	160 W	Jan 6, 2025	$349

== List of Arrow Lake Refresh processors ==
=== Desktop ===
==== Arrow Lake-S ====
CPUs underlined support Intel vPro with the Q870 (enterprise) and W880 (entry-level workstation) chipsets, and ECC memory only on the W880 chipset.

Branding	SKU	Cores (threads)		Clock rate (GHz)				Arc Graphics		NPU (TOPS)	Cache		TDP		Released	Price (USD)
Branding	SKU	Cores (threads)		Base		Turbo		Arc Graphics		NPU (TOPS)	Cache		TDP		Released	Price (USD)
Branding	SKU	P	E	P	E	P	E	X^{e} Cores (VE:RT)	Clock (GHz)	NPU (TOPS)	L2	L3	Base	Turbo	Released	Price (USD)
Core Ultra 7	270K Plus	8 (8)	16 (16)	3.7	3.2	5.5	4.7	4 (64:4)	2.0	13	40 MB	36 MB	125 W	250 W	March 26, 2026	$299
Core Ultra 5	250K Plus	6 (6)	12 (12)	4.2	3.3	5.3	4.6	4 (64:4)	1.9	13	30 MB	30 MB	125 W	159 W	March 26, 2026	$199
Core Ultra 5	250KF Plus	6 (6)	12 (12)	4.2	3.3	5.3	4.6	—N/a		13	30 MB	30 MB	125 W	159 W	March 26, 2026	$184

=== Mobile ===
==== Arrow Lake-HX ====
Branding	SKU	Cores (threads)		Clock rate (GHz)				Arc Graphics		NPU (TOPS)	Cache		TDP		Released	Price (USD)
Branding	SKU	Cores (threads)		Base		Turbo		Arc Graphics		NPU (TOPS)	Cache		TDP		Released	Price (USD)
Branding	SKU	P	E	P	E	P	E	X^{e} Cores (VE:RT)	Clock (GHz)	NPU (TOPS)	L2	L3	Base	Turbo	Released	Price (USD)
Core Ultra 9	290HX Plus	8 (8)	16 (16)	2.7	1.8	5.5	4.7	4 (64:4)	2.0	13	40 MB	36 MB	55 W	160 W	March 17, 2026	
Core Ultra 7	270HX Plus	8 (8)	12 (12)	2.4	1.8	5.3	4.7	4 (64:4)	1.9	13	36 MB	30 MB	55 W	160 W	March 17, 2026	

== Reception ==
Source	Reviewed processor	Rating	Notes
PC Gamer	245K	3.5/5 stars	
PCGamesN	265K	5/10	
PCMag	285K	4/5 stars	
TechSpot	285K	3/5 stars	
Tom's Hardware	285K	3/5 stars	

Arrow Lake-S desktop processors received mixed reviews at launch due to its lack of generational performance uplift or even performance regression in some cases. Paul Alcorn's review for Tom's Hardware gave the Core Ultra 9 285K three out of five stars. Alcorn concluded that it is "hard to recommend the Core Ultra 9 285K over competing processors" due to struggling to "keep up with their prior generation counterparts in gaming". On average, the 285K loses to AMD's Zen 5-based Ryzen 7 9700X while the Core Ultra 5 245K is outperformed by the Zen 3-based Ryzen 7 5700X3D, whereas the 5700X3D in itself is in turn of what's essentially a lower-clocked variant of the 5800X3D being released in April 2022 (which has been virtually held back since in favor of the 5800X3D itself) – A by then already 2-year old CPU at the time of the release and following test of Arrow Lake itself.

Steven Walton's three star review for TechSpot found similarly lacking gaming performance with the 285K particularly struggling in Cyberpunk 2077: Phantom Liberty, falling behind the 14900K by 20%, and in A Plague Tale: Requiem where it was outperformed by the 14900K by 17%. Some titles saw less of a regression such as Hitman 3 where it was 2% slower than the 14900K with Walton calling it "14700K-like performance". In productivity, TechSpot found the 285K to be weaker than the 14700K and 14900K in Adobe Premiere Pro 2024 and was bested by the 12600K in Photoshop 2025. Another concern for Arrow Lake was its higher pricing compared to the similarly performing 14900K's street pricing. This is in addition to requiring a new motherboard due to the new LGA 1851 socket.

Arrow Lake was commended for advances in power efficiency compared to Raptor Lake. TechSpot observed that, in gaming, Arrow Lake's power consumption is "much improved over the 14900K" but "the results still fall short when compared to Ryzen processors". PCWorld found a 17% (65 watts) decrease in power consumption during a HandBrake AV1 encode and a 16% (22 watts) decrease during Cinebench 2024's single-core benchmark. The Skymont E-cores in Arrow Lake were praised by Nick Evanson in PC Gamer. Evanson found that newer, more multithreaded games like Cyberpunk 2077 and Baldur's Gate 3 could utilize E-cores alongside the P-cores for increased performance rather than being limited to the 8 threads provided by the more powerful P-cores. Games having to increasingly rely on E-cores may be due to the removal of SMT from the P-cores, providing 8 fewer P-core threads compared to Raptor Lake.

=== Sales ===
In the United States and Japan, the Core Ultra 9 285K sold out at major retailers, though supply to retailers was reported to be limited at launch due to enthusiasts.

=== Response from Intel ===
In November 2024, Robert Hallock, vice president and general manager of client AI and technical marketing at Intel, acknowledged that Arrow Lake's launch "didn't go as planned" as gaming performance regression was observed in reviews. Hallock claimed that Arrow Lake processors suffer from a "series of issues" at both the operating system and BIOS levels. Third-party reviews did not reflect Intel's own internal testing according to Hallock. One reviewer recorded Arrow Lake memory latency as high as 180 ns, over twice the 70–80 ns expected memory latency. Hallock promised updates and fixes for Arrow Lake to come by early December 2024. Intel subsequently released a report addressing the poor gaming performance. The ostensibly "untapped performance" was never restored and subsequent benchmarking by independent reviewers didn't reveal any serious performance uplift vs. the initial released firmware, and the lineup continued to underperform vs. even the previous generation AMD Zen 4 chips. Intel later admitted that they had "fumbled" the Arrow Lake architecture and they were hopeful for the future.

== See also ==
- Zen 5 – a competing x86 architecture from AMD
- Lunar Lake – other variants of Arrow Lake microprocessor featuring X^{e}2-LPG graphics and a faster NPU

== Notes ==
Atom (ULV)		Node name	Pentium/Core						
Microarch.	Step	Node name	Microarch.	Step					
		600 nm	P6	Pentium Pro (133 MHz)					
		500 nm	P6	Pentium Pro (150 MHz)					
		350 nm	P6	Pentium Pro (166–200 MHz)					
		350 nm	P6	Klamath					
		250 nm	P6	Deschutes					
		250 nm	P6	Katmai	NetBurst				
		180 nm	P6	Coppermine	Willamette				
		130 nm	P6	Tualatin	Northwood				
		130 nm	Pentium M (P6)	Banias	Northwood		NetBurst(HT)		NetBurst(×2)
		90 nm	Pentium M (P6)	Dothan	Prescott	⇨	Prescott‑2M	⇨	Smithfield
		90 nm	Pentium M (P6)	Dothan	~~Tejas~~	→	⇩	→	~~Cedarmill (Tejas)~~
		65 nm	Pentium M (P6)	Yonah	~~Nehalem (NetBurst)~~		Cedar Mill	⇨	Presler
		65 nm	Core	Merom	4 cores on mainstream desktop, DDR3 introduced				
Bonnell	Bonnell	45 nm	Core	Penryn					
Bonnell	Bonnell	45 nm	Nehalem	Nehalem	HT reintroduced, integrated MC, PCH; L3-cache introduced, 256 KB L2-cache/core				
Bonnell	Saltwell	32 nm	Nehalem	Westmere	Introduced GPU on same package and AES-NI				
Bonnell	Saltwell	32 nm	Sandy Bridge	Sandy Bridge	On-die ring bus, no more non-UEFI motherboards				
Silvermont	Silvermont	22 nm	Sandy Bridge	Ivy Bridge					
Silvermont	Silvermont	22 nm	Haswell	Haswell	Fully integrated voltage regulator				
Silvermont	Airmont	14 nm	Haswell	Broadwell					
Silvermont	Airmont	14 nm	Skylake	Skylake	DDR4 introduced on mainstream desktop				
Goldmont		14 nm	Skylake	Kaby Lake					
Goldmont		14 nm	Skylake	Coffee Lake	6 cores on mainstream desktop				
Goldmont		14 nm	Skylake	Amber Lake	Mobile-only				
Goldmont Plus		14 nm	Skylake	Whiskey Lake	Mobile-only				
Goldmont Plus		14 nm	Skylake	Coffee Lake Refresh	8 cores on mainstream desktop				
Goldmont Plus		14 nm	Skylake	Comet Lake	10 cores on mainstream desktop				
Goldmont Plus		14 nm	Sunny Cove	Cypress Cove (Rocket Lake)	Backported Sunny Cove microarchitecture for 14 nm				
Tremont		10 nm	Skylake	Palm Cove (Cannon Lake)	Mobile-only				
Tremont		10 nm	Sunny Cove	Sunny Cove (Ice Lake)	512 KB L2-cache/core				
Tremont		10 nm	Sunny Cove	Willow Cove (Tiger Lake)	X^{e} graphics engine				
Gracemont		Intel 7 (10 nm ESF)	Golden Cove	Golden Cove (Alder Lake)	Hybrid, DDR5, PCIe 5.0				
Gracemont		Intel 7 (10 nm ESF)	Golden Cove	Raptor Cove (Raptor Lake)					
Crestmont		Intel 4	Redwood Cove	Meteor Lake	Mobile-only; NPU, chiplet architecture				
Crestmont		Intel 3	Redwood Cove	Arrow Lake-U					
Skymont		TSMC N3B	Lion Cove	Lunar Lake	Low power mobile only (9–30 W)				
Skymont		TSMC N3B	Lion Cove	Arrow Lake					
Darkmont		Intel 18A	Cougar Cove	Panther Lake					
Arctic Wolf		Intel 18A and/or TSMC N2P	Coyote Cove	Nova Lake					
