= Lunar Lake =

Intel microprocessor series released in 2024

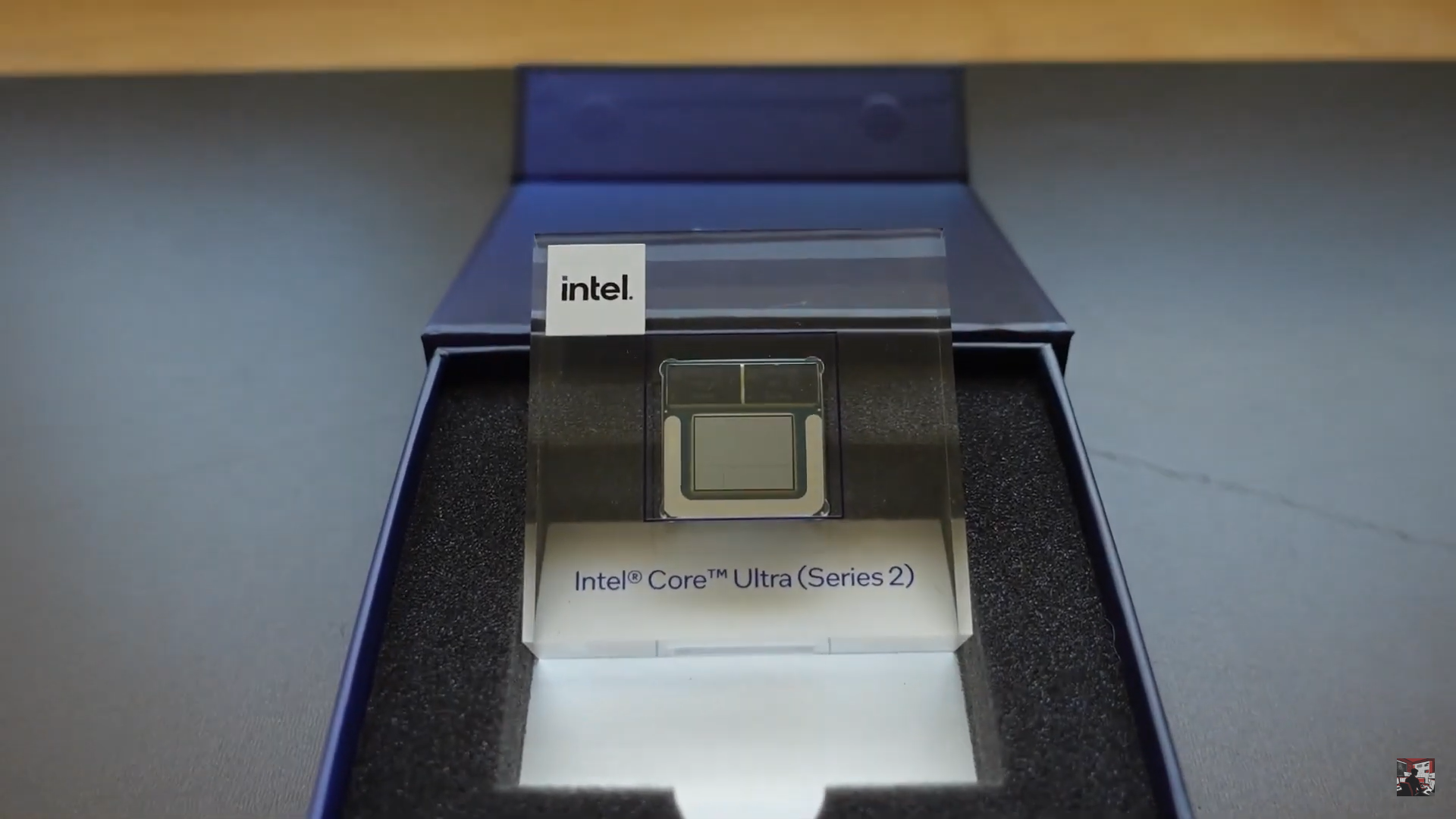
- Intel Core Ultra Series 2 processor
- Launched: September 2024
- Designed by: Intel
- Manufactured by: TSMC
- Fabrication process: TSMC N3B; TSMC N6
- Codename(s): LNL
- Platform(s): Mobile

Branding
- Brand name(s): Core Ultra
- Generation: Series 2
- Socket(s): BGA 2833

Instructions and architecture
- Instructions set: x86-64
- Instructions: x86, IA-32, x86-64
- Extensions: SSE4.1, SSE4.2, AVX2
- P-core architecture: Lion Cove
- E-core architecture: Skymont

Cores
- Core count: Up to 8 cores: 4 P-cores; 4 E-cores
- P-core L0 cache: 48 KB data (per core)
- P-core L1 cache: 256 KB (per core): 64 KB instructions; 192 KB data
- E-core L1 cache: 96 KB (per core): 64 KB instructions; 32 KB data
- P-core L2 cache: 2.5 MB (per core)
- E-core L2 cache: 4 MB (per cluster)
- P-core L3 cache: 3 MB (per core)

Graphics
- Graphics architecture: X^{e}2-LPG (Battlemage)
- Execution units: Up to 64 EUs
- X^{e} cores: Up to 8 X^{e} Cores

NPU
- Architecture: NPU 4
- TOPS: Up to 48

Memory support
- Type: LPDDR5X-8533
- Memory channels: 2 channels
- Maximum capacity: Up to 32 GB

I/O
- PCIe support: PCIe 5.0
- PCIe lanes: 8 lanes: 4 PCIe 5.0 lanes; 4 PCIe 4.0 lanes

History
- Predecessor: Meteor Lake
- Variant: Arrow Lake
- Successor: Panther Lake

Lunar Lake is the codename for Core Ultra 200V Series mobile processors designed by Intel, released in September 2024. It is a successor to Meteor Lake which saw Intel move from monolithic silicon to a disaggregated MCM design.

== Background ==
On May 24, 2024, details on the Lunar Lake architecture were unveiled during Intel's Computex presentation in Taiwan. SKU names of Lunar Lake processors or details such as clock speeds were not announced.

== Architecture ==
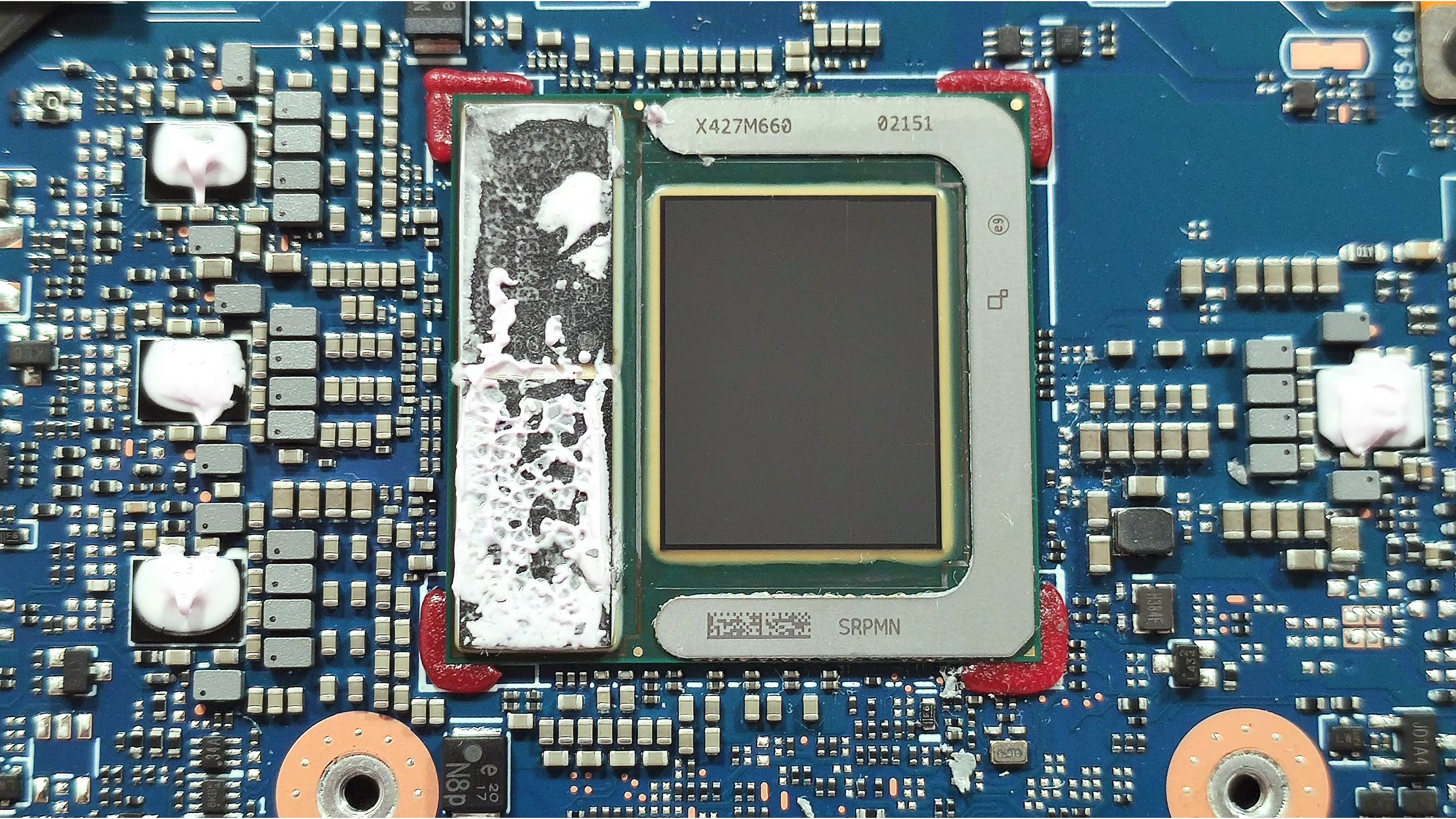
Lunar Lake CPU in a laptop motherboard

Lunar Lake is an ultra-low power mobile SoC design. It is a successor to 15 W Meteor Lake-U processors while Arrow Lake replaces the midrange 28 W Meteor Lake-H processors. Lunar Lake's focus on increased power efficiency targets premium ultra-thin laptops and compact mobile designs. Intel said that with Lunar Lake, it aimed to "bust the myth that [x86] can't be as efficient" as ARM. Analysis of tests performed on Lunar Lake CPUs available at market launch indicated that, although their multi-core performance was not particularly good under full load, their efficiency under everyday use was good, even if the ARM competition still has its advantages.

=== Process node ===
Lunar Lake is the first processor design by Intel where all logic dies are entirely fabricated on external nodes outsourced to TSMC. An analysis by Goldman Sachs indicated that Intel would be spending $5.6 billion in 2024 and $9.7 billion in 2025 outsourcing to TSMC. In March 2024, Intel's chief financial officer admitted during an investment call that the company was "a little bit heavier than we want to be in terms of external wafer manufacturing versus internal". The following month, Intel disclosed that their foundry business made a $7 billion operating loss during 2023.

Tile	Node	EUV	Die size	Ref.
Compute tile	TSMC N3B	Yes	140mm^{2}	
Platform controller tile	TSMC N6	Yes	46mm^{2}	
Foveros interposer base tile	Intel 22FFL	No	Unknown	

=== Compute tile ===
The Compute tile is Lunar Lake's largest tile. It has expanded functions over Meteor Lake's compute tile which solely housed CPU cores and cache. Instead, Lunar Lake's compute tile houses CPU cores and their cache, the GPU and the NPU. The previous generation Meteor Lake used the Intel 4 process on its compute tile while Lunar Lake moves to TSMC's N3B node. N3B is TSMC's first generation 3 nm node with lower yields compared to the updated N3E node. Lunar Lake's compute tile was originally planned to be built on Intel's 18A node. 18A will not debut until 2025 with Panther Lake mobile processors and Clearwater Forest server processors. Lunar Lake shares the same Lion Cove P-core and Skymont E-core architectures with Arrow Lake desktop and mobile processors.

With the Lion Cove P-core, Intel claims a 14% IPC uplift on average over Redwood Cove. Simultaneous multithreading (SMT) has been removed from Lunar Lake's Lion Cove P-cores. SMT first made its debut in an Intel desktop processor with the Northwood-based Pentium 4 in 2002. The last x86-64 Intel desktop processor lineup not to feature SMT in any way was Core 2, which was discontinued in 2011 (Note: SMT was physically present in previous Intel core architectures like Sandy Bridge, Haswell and Skylake but it could be disabled from the factory in some lower-end Celeron and Pentium SKUs. For example, Coffee Lake's Skylake cores contained SMT but it was disabled in the Core i7-9700K with 8 cores and 8 threads while the Core i9-9900K had 8 cores and 16 threads.). SMT, or Intel's marketing term HyperThreading, allows a single physical CPU core with 2 threads to execute two tasks simultaneously. In the early 2000s, SMT was a way to add more processing threads to dual and quad-core CPUs while not using too much die space. The removal of SMT allows the physical core die area to be reduced. Increasing the number of processing threads with a greater number of physical cores can compensate for the removal of SMT providing 2 threads per core. Intel's removal of SMT yields a 15% saving in die area and 5% greater performance-per-watt. To counteract the removal of SMT, Intel prioritized executing more instructions per cycle for high single-threaded performance rather than parallel execution. L2 cache per core for Lion Cove is increased to 2.5 MB from Redwood Cove's 2 MB. Lunar Lake is able to exercise more granular control over Lion Cove's boost clocks. Lion Cove's boost clocks are able to increase in increments of 16.67 MHz rather than in 100 MHz increments.

Lunar Lake's cluster of 4 Skymont E-cores exist on a 'Low Power Island' separate from the P-cores. As a result, the E-cores have their own dedicated L3 cache not accessible to the P-cores rather than sitting on a ringbus fabric with P-cores. Intel claims a massive 68% IPC gain in Skymont E-cores over Crestmont. It achieves this with the inclusion of new 8-wide integer ALUs, doubled from Crestmont.

==== Neural Processing Unit (NPU) ====
Lunar Lake's Neural Processing Unit (NPU), which performs AI operations locally, in-silicon rather than in the cloud, has been updated to Intel's "NPU 4" architecture with increased clock speeds. Intel claims that Lunar Lake can achieve a total of 120 int8 TOPS of performance in AI workloads, with 48 int8 TOPS coming from the NPU alone while an additional 67 int8 TOPS come from the GPU and 5 int8 TOPS from the CPU. Lunar Lake's 48 dedicated NPU TOPS meets Microsoft's requirements for laptops in order to be certified as Copilot+ PCs. Microsoft has mandated 40 TOPs on NPU performance in order to run Copilot locally on Windows PCs. For comparison, the NPU in Meteor Lake and Arrow Lake processors is able to output 10 TOPs.

==== Graphics ====
Lunar Lake's GPU features second generation X^{e}2-LPG cores based on the Battlemage graphics architecture. The Battlemage architecture launched in Lunar Lake mobile processors before discrete Arc desktop graphics cards. It contains eight X^{e}2-LPG cores that share an 8 MB L2 cache. The GPU is able to provide up to 67 TOPS of INT8 compute for AI processing. The display engine has three display pipes with HDMI 2.1, DisplayPort 2.1 and a new eDP 1.5 connection. It features H.266 VVC hardware fixed-function decoding support.

=== Platform controller tile ===
The small platform controller tile provides security functions and I/O connectivity including Wi-Fi 7, Thunderbolt 4, 4 PCIe 4.0 lanes and 4 PCIe 5.0 lanes. Lunar Lake's platform controller tile uses the same N6 node from TSMC that is used by Meteor Lake and Arrow Lake's SoC tiles. The platform controller tile in Lunar Lake does not feature two dedicated low power E-cores like those in Meteor Lake and Arrow Lake's SoC tile. This change has been attributed to the power efficiency gains from the compute tile moving from the Intel 4 process to TSMC's more advanced N3B node.

=== Memory ===
Lunar Lake features on-package LPDDR5X-8533 RAM available in 16 GB or 32 GB capacities. This on-package memory is a similar approach to Apple with its M series SoCs that integrate unified LPDDR memory onto the package beside the CPU silicon. On-package memory allows the CPU to benefit from higher memory bandwidth at lower power and decreased latency as memory is physically closer to the CPU. Intel claims that Lunar Lake's on-package memory achieved a reduction of 40% in power consumption and "up to 250 square millimeters" of space. Furthermore, memory that is integrated onto the CPU package means that the overall processor physical footprint in laptops can be reduced as memory does not need to be placed onto a separate board with its own cooling solution. Less complex cooling being required means that Lunar Lake processors can more easily fit in ultra-low power compact mobile solutions. The downside of Lunar Lake's on-package memory is that is not user replaceable or upgradable to higher capacities beyond 32 GB with SO-DIMMs. Due to the inclusion of on-package memory, an extra 2 W is added to the TDP of Lunar Lake processors. Lunar Lake processors have a TDP ranging from 17 to 30 W compared to the 15–28 W TDP of Meteor Lake-H processors.

== List of Lunar Lake processors ==
=== Mobile processors ===
Common features of mobile Lunar Lake CPUs:

- Release date: September 24, 2024
- RAM support: LPDDR5X-8533

Branding	SKU	Cores (threads)		Clock rate (GHz)			Arc Graphics		NPU (int8 TOPS)	Smart cache (Note: Only the P-cores can access this L3 cache.)	Memory	TDP		
Branding	SKU	Cores (threads)		Base	Turbo		Arc Graphics		NPU (int8 TOPS)	Smart cache	Memory	TDP		
Branding	SKU	P	LP-E	Base	P	LP-E	X^{e} cores (XVEs)	Max. freq. (GHz)	NPU (int8 TOPS)	Smart cache	Capacity	Base	Turbo	cTDP
Core Ultra 9	288V	4 (4)	4 (4)	3.3	5.1	3.7	8 (64)	2.05	48	12 MB	32 GB	30 W	37 W	17-37 W
Core Ultra 7	268V	4 (4)	4 (4)	2.2	5.0	3.7	8 (64)	2.0	48	12 MB	32 GB	17 W	37 W	8–37 W
Core Ultra 7	266V	4 (4)	4 (4)	2.2	5.0	3.7	8 (64)	2.0	48	12 MB	16 GB	17 W	37 W	8–37 W
Core Ultra 7	258V	4 (4)	4 (4)	2.2	4.8	3.7	8 (64)	1.95	47	12 MB	32 GB	17 W	37 W	8–37 W
Core Ultra 7	256V	4 (4)	4 (4)	2.2	4.8	3.7	8 (64)	1.95	47	12 MB	16 GB	17 W	37 W	8–37 W
Core Ultra 5	238V	4 (4)	4 (4)	2.1	4.7	3.5	7 (56)	1.85	40	8 MB	32 GB	17 W	37 W	8–37 W
Core Ultra 5	236V	4 (4)	4 (4)	2.1	4.7	3.5	7 (56)	1.85	40	8 MB	16 GB	17 W	37 W	8–37 W
Core Ultra 5	228V	4 (4)	4 (4)	2.1	4.5	3.5	7 (56)	1.85	40	8 MB	32 GB	17 W	37 W	8–37 W
Core Ultra 5	226V	4 (4)	4 (4)	2.1	4.5	3.5	7 (56)	1.85	40	8 MB	16 GB	17 W	37 W	8–37 W

== See also ==
- Zen 5 – a competing x86 architecture from AMD
- Arrow Lake

== Notes ==
Atom (ULV)		Node name	Pentium/Core						
Microarch.	Step	Node name	Microarch.	Step					
		600 nm	P6	Pentium Pro (133 MHz)					
		500 nm	P6	Pentium Pro (150 MHz)					
		350 nm	P6	Pentium Pro (166–200 MHz)					
		350 nm	P6	Klamath					
		250 nm	P6	Deschutes					
		250 nm	P6	Katmai	NetBurst				
		180 nm	P6	Coppermine	Willamette				
		130 nm	P6	Tualatin	Northwood				
		130 nm	Pentium M (P6)	Banias	Northwood		NetBurst(HT)		NetBurst(×2)
		90 nm	Pentium M (P6)	Dothan	Prescott	⇨	Prescott‑2M	⇨	Smithfield
		90 nm	Pentium M (P6)	Dothan	~~Tejas~~	→	⇩	→	~~Cedarmill (Tejas)~~
		65 nm	Pentium M (P6)	Yonah	~~Nehalem (NetBurst)~~		Cedar Mill	⇨	Presler
		65 nm	Core	Merom	4 cores on mainstream desktop, DDR3 introduced				
Bonnell	Bonnell	45 nm	Core	Penryn					
Bonnell	Bonnell	45 nm	Nehalem	Nehalem	HT reintroduced, integrated MC, PCH; L3-cache introduced, 256 KB L2-cache/core				
Bonnell	Saltwell	32 nm	Nehalem	Westmere	Introduced GPU on same package and AES-NI				
Bonnell	Saltwell	32 nm	Sandy Bridge	Sandy Bridge	On-die ring bus, no more non-UEFI motherboards				
Silvermont	Silvermont	22 nm	Sandy Bridge	Ivy Bridge					
Silvermont	Silvermont	22 nm	Haswell	Haswell	Fully integrated voltage regulator				
Silvermont	Airmont	14 nm	Haswell	Broadwell					
Silvermont	Airmont	14 nm	Skylake	Skylake	DDR4 introduced on mainstream desktop				
Goldmont		14 nm	Skylake	Kaby Lake					
Goldmont		14 nm	Skylake	Coffee Lake	6 cores on mainstream desktop				
Goldmont		14 nm	Skylake	Amber Lake	Mobile-only				
Goldmont Plus		14 nm	Skylake	Whiskey Lake	Mobile-only				
Goldmont Plus		14 nm	Skylake	Coffee Lake Refresh	8 cores on mainstream desktop				
Goldmont Plus		14 nm	Skylake	Comet Lake	10 cores on mainstream desktop				
Goldmont Plus		14 nm	Sunny Cove	Cypress Cove (Rocket Lake)	Backported Sunny Cove microarchitecture for 14 nm				
Tremont		10 nm	Skylake	Palm Cove (Cannon Lake)	Mobile-only				
Tremont		10 nm	Sunny Cove	Sunny Cove (Ice Lake)	512 KB L2-cache/core				
Tremont		10 nm	Sunny Cove	Willow Cove (Tiger Lake)	X^{e} graphics engine				
Gracemont		Intel 7 (10 nm ESF)	Golden Cove	Golden Cove (Alder Lake)	Hybrid, DDR5, PCIe 5.0				
Gracemont		Intel 7 (10 nm ESF)	Golden Cove	Raptor Cove (Raptor Lake)					
Crestmont		Intel 4	Redwood Cove	Meteor Lake	Mobile-only; NPU, chiplet architecture				
Crestmont		Intel 3	Redwood Cove	Arrow Lake-U					
Skymont		TSMC N3B	Lion Cove	Lunar Lake	Low power mobile only (9–30 W)				
Skymont		TSMC N3B	Lion Cove	Arrow Lake					
Darkmont		Intel 18A	Cougar Cove	Panther Lake					
Arctic Wolf		Intel 18A and/or TSMC N2P	Coyote Cove	Nova Lake					
