= LGA 1954 =

Intel microprocessor compatible socket for Nova Lake-S

- Release date: Q1 2027
- Designed by: Intel
- Type: LGA-ZIF
- Chip form factors: Flip-chip
- Contacts: 1954
- FSB protocol: PCI Express
- Processor dimensions: 37.5 mm × 45 mm 1,687.5mm^{2}
- Processors: Nova Lake
- Predecessor: LGA 1851
- Memory support: DDR5
- This article is part of the CPU socket series

LGA 1954 is a land grid array CPU socket designed by Intel for Nova Lake-S desktop processors, which will be released in Q1 2027.

== Nova Lake chipsets (900 series) ==
			B960	Z970	Z990	Q970	W980
Overclocking		CPU	No	Yes		No	
Overclocking		Memory	Yes			No	Yes
CPU support			Nova Lake				
Memory capacity			Up to 256 GB				
Maximum DIMM slots			4				
ECC memory			No				UDIMM
Maximum USB 2.0 ports			None				
USB 3.2 ports configuration	Gen 1x1		Up to 6		Up to 10	Up to 8	Up to 10
USB 3.2 ports configuration	Gen 2	×1	Up to 4		Up to 10	Up to 8	Up to 10
USB 3.2 ports configuration	Gen 2	×2	Up to 2		Up to 5	Up to 4	Up to 5
TB4/USB4 ports			1		2		
Maximum SATA 3.0 ports			4		8		
Processor PCI Express configuration		5.0	1×16		1×16 or 2×8		
Processor PCI Express configuration		5.0 (for M.2)	1×4		1×8 or 2×4		
PCH PCI Express configuration		5.0	None		12	8	12
PCH PCI Express configuration		4.0	14		12		
Independent display support (digital ports/pipes)			4				
Integrated wireless			Yes				
PCIe RAID support			No		0, 1, 5, 10		
SATA RAID support			0, 1, 5, 10				
Intel Smart Sound technology			Yes				
Intel Active Management, Trusted Execution and vPro technology			No			Yes	
Chipset TDP							
Release date			Q1 2027				
