= Panther Lake (microprocessor) =

Intel microprocessor series released in 2026

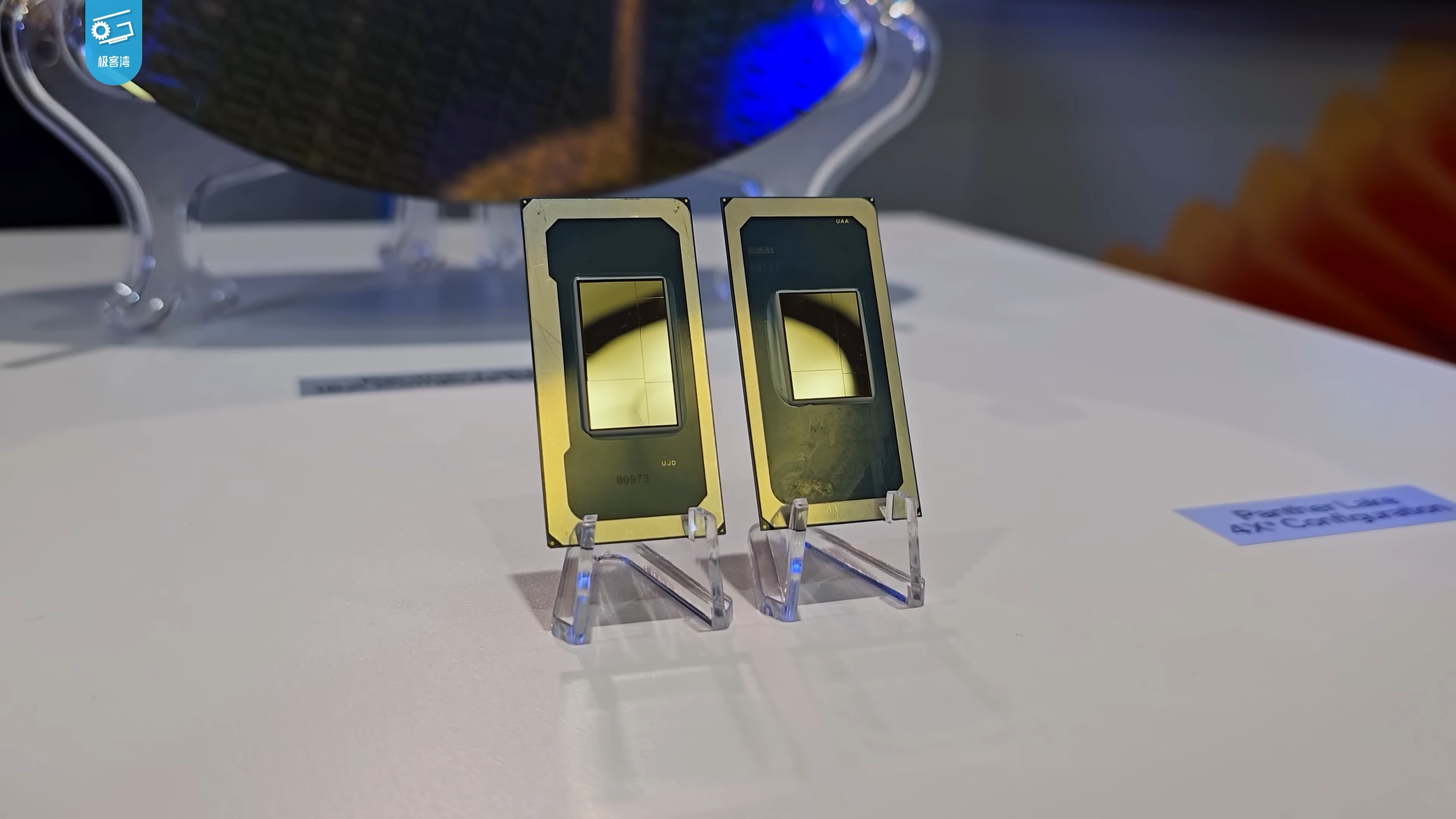
- Two exhibited Panther Lake processors
- Launched: January 2026
- Designed by: Intel
- Manufactured by: Intel
- Fabrication process: Intel 18A; Intel 3; TSMC N3E
- Codename(s): PTL
- Platform(s): Mobile

Branding
- Brand name(s): Core Ultra Series 3; Core Series 3; Arc G3; Starfire
- Generation: 3
- Socket(s): FCBGA 2540

Instructions and architecture
- Instructions set: x86-64
- Instructions: x86 (IA-32 and x86-64)
- Extensions: SSE4, AVX, AVX2, AVX-VNNI, AVX-IFMA AES-NI, SHA-NI, RDRAND, SM3, SM4 VT-x, VT-d
- P-core architecture: Cougar Cove (P-cores)
- E-core architecture: Darkmont (E-cores and LP E-cores)

Cores
- Core count: Up to 16 cores (high power, 4 P-cores, 8 E-cores, 4 LP-cores), or 8 cores (low power, 4 P-cores, 4 LP-cores)
- P-core L0 cache: 48 KB data (per core)
- P-core L1 cache: 256 KB (per core): 64 KB instructions; 192 KB data
- E-core L1 cache: 96 KB (per core): 64 KB instructions; 32 KB data
- P-core L2 cache: 2.5 MB (per core)
- E-core L2 cache: 4 MB (per cluster)
- P-core L3 cache: 3 MB (per core)

Graphics
- Graphics architecture: Xe3-LPG (Battlemage)
- Model(s): Intel Graphics, Arc B370, Arc B390
- X^{e} cores: Up to 12 X^{e} Cores
- Peak graphics clock: 2.5 GHz

NPU
- Architecture: NPU 5
- TOPS: Up to 50 (int8)

Memory support
- Type: LPDDR5X-9600; DDR5-7200
- Memory channels: 2 channels
- Maximum capacity: Up to 128 GB

I/O
- PCIe support: PCIe 5.0
- PCIe lanes: Low power and Arc iGPU processors, 12 lanes: 4 PCIe 5.0 lanes; 8 PCIe 4.0 lanes; H series processors, 20 lanes: 12 PCIe 5.0 lanes; 8 PCIe 4.0 lanes

History
- Predecessor: Lunar Lake; Arrow Lake
- Successor: Nova Lake

Panther Lake or PTL is the Core Ultra Series 3 mobile processor line developed by Intel. The architecture was launched in January 2026 at CES 2026. It succeeds and extends Lunar Lake and is designed as a scalable mobile platform spanning a wider range of power and performance targets, from thin-and-light laptops to higher-performance mobile systems. The Core Ultra X9 378H CPU was launched separately, without a formal announcement, in April 2026.

== Architecture ==
Panther Lake combines a heterogeneous CPU core tile manufactured on Intel's in-house 18A process with an integrated graphics tile based on the Arc Xe3 architecture, which is derived from the earlier Xe2 (Battlemage) design, and an I/O tile manufactured on TSMC's N6 process.

The clusters vary in size: The big 4+8+4 core tile is used in the H series, and the small 4+4 core tile is used in the low-power processors. Non-Arc H series CPUs also are the only processors in this lineup to utilize the larger I/O tile, while Arc H series and low-power CPUs use the smaller core tile. Said tiles both support DDR5 and LPDDR5X memory, however, the larger tile has more PCIe lanes. Arc H series CPUs use a binned variant of the smaller I/O tile that doesn't support DDR5. There are also smaller GPU tiles which have up to 4 Xe cores, and larger GPU tiles which have up to 12 Xe tiles. The latter being branded and labeled as Arc B390/B370 if the machine using it reaches memory speeds of at least LPDDR5X-7467, otherwise they will be labeled as just Intel Graphics. Some models with the larger GPU tile continue to rely on TSMC manufacturing for the GPU on its N3E process, possibly due to budget concerns.

Rather than introducing a fundamentally new CPU or GPU architecture, Panther Lake focuses on higher core counts, better graphics configurations, and increased power budgets enabled by a newer manufacturing node and modular tile-based design.

Furthermore, instead of developing a more capable NPU, Intel has opted for an optimized, smaller and more efficient NPU that delivers about the same performance as the previous generation's NPU.

== List of Panther Lake processors ==
Panther Lake CPUs omit hyper-threading support.

=== Mobile ===
==== Panther Lake High Power ====
| Core Ultra Series 3 | | X9 | 9 | X9 | X7 | 7 | X7 | 7 | 5 | |
| Model | | 388H | 386H | 378H | 368H | 366H | 358H | 356H | 338H | 336H |
|---|---|---|---|---|---|---|---|---|---|---|
| Cores | P | 4 | | | | | | | | |
| Cores | E | 8 | | | | | | | 4 | |
| Cores | LP-E | 4 | | | | | | | | |
| Base clock rate (GHz) | P | 2.1 | | 2.0 | | | 1.9 | | | |
| Base clock rate (GHz) | E | 1.6 | | | | | 1.5 | | | |
| Base clock rate (GHz) | LP-E | 1.6 | | | | | 1.5 | | | |
| Turbo Boost (GHz) | P | 5.1 | 4.9 | 5.0 | | 4.8 | | 4.7 | | 4.6 |
| Turbo Boost (GHz) | E | 3.8 | 3.7 | 3.8 | | 3.6 | 3.5 | | 3.4 | |
| Turbo Boost (GHz) | LP-E | 3.7 | 3.5 | 3.6 | | 3.4 | 3.3 | | | 3.2 |
| Graphics | Name | Arc B390 | Intel | Arc B390 | | Intel | Arc B390 | Intel | Arc B370 | Intel |
| Graphics | Xe cores | 12 | 4 | 12 | | 4 | 12 | 4 | 10 | 4 |
| Graphics | Max Turbo (GHz) | 2.5 | | | | | | 2.45 | 2.4 | 2.3 |
| NPU (int8 TOPS) | | 50 | | | | | | | 47 | |
| Intel vPro | | Yes | | No | Yes | | No | | Yes | |
| Smart Cache | | 18 MB | | | | | | | | |
| TDP | Min | 15 W | | | | | | | | |
| TDP | Base | 25 W | | | | | | | | |
| TDP | Turbo | 80 W | | | | | | | 65 W | |

==== Panther Lake ====
| Core Ultra Series 3 | | 7 | | 5 | | | |
| Model | | 365 | 355 | 335 | 332 | 325 | 322 |
|---|---|---|---|---|---|---|---|
| Cores | P | 4 | | | 2 | 4 | 2 |
| Cores | LP-E | 4 | | | | | |
| Base clock rate (GHz) | P | 2.4 | 2.3 | 2.2 | 2.5 | 2.1 | 2.5 |
| Base clock rate (GHz) | LP-E | 1.8 | 1.7 | 1.6 | 1.9 | 1.6 | 1.9 |
| Turbo Boost (GHz) | P | 4.8 | 4.7 | 4.6 | 4.4 | 4.5 | 4.4 |
| Turbo Boost (GHz) | LP-E | 3.6 | 3.5 | 3.4 | 3.3 | 3.4 | 3.3 |
| Graphics | Name | Intel Graphics | | | | | |
| Graphics | Xe cores | 4 | | | 2 | 4 | 2 |
| Graphics | Max Turbo (GHz) | 2.5 | | 2.45 | 2.3 | 2.45 | 2.3 |
| NPU (int8 TOPS) | | 49 | | 47 | 46 | 47 | 46 |
| Intel vPro | | Yes | No | Yes | | No | |
| Smart Cache | | 12 MB | | | | | |
| TDP | Min | 12 W | | | | | |
| TDP | Base | 25 W | | | | | |
| TDP | Turbo | 55 W | | | | | |

== Wildcat Lake ==
In April 2026, Intel launched Wildcat Lake, a variant of Panther Lake intended for value laptops, commercial systems and edge devices. This series features a simpler design, lower performance, and lower power consumption. The Ultra moniker has been dropped and they are simply called the "Intel Core Series 3".

=== List of Wildcat Lake processors ===
- RAM support: up to 64 GB of RAM in single channel mode (either LPDDR5X-7467 or DDR5-6400)
- Socket: FCBGA1516
- PCI Express revision: 4.0, 6 lanes
- Image Processing Unit: removed

| Core Series 3 | | 7 | | 5 | | | 3 | |
| Model | | 360 | 350 | 330 | 320 | 315 | 305 | 304 |
|---|---|---|---|---|---|---|---|---|
| Cores | P | 2 | | | | | | 1 |
| Cores | LP-E | 4 | | | | | | |
| Base clock rate (GHz) | P | 1.5 | | | | | | |
| Base clock rate (GHz) | LP-E | 1.4 | | | | | | |
| Turbo Boost (GHz) | P | 4.8 | | 4.6 | | 4.4 | 4.3 | |
| Turbo Boost (GHz) | LP-E | 3.6 | | 3.4 | | 3.3 | | |
| Graphics | Name | Intel Graphics | | | | | | |
| Graphics | Xe cores | 2 | | | | | 1 | |
| Graphics | Max Turbo (GHz) | 2.6 | | 2.5 | | 2.3 | | |
| NPU (int8 TOPS) | | 17 | | 16 | | 15 | —N/a | 15 |
| Smart Cache | | 6 MB | | | | | | |
| TDP | Min | 10 W | | | | | | |
| TDP | Base | 15 W | | | | | | |
| TDP | Turbo | 35 W | | | | | | |
| Price (USD) (Note: Price is Recommended Customer Price (RCP) at launch. RCP is the trade price that processors are sold by Intel to retailers and OEMs. Actual MSRP for consumers is higher.) | | $426 | $469 | $309 | $340 | | $309 | |

== Arc G3 ==
The Arc G3 series, released May 28, 2026, is a scaled-down variant of the Core Ultra 3 series, designed for handhelds and other portable gaming devices with lower power consumption.

=== List of Arc G-series processors ===
| Model | | G3 Extreme | G3 |
| Cores | P | 2 | |
| Cores | E | 8 | |
| Cores | LP-E | 4 | |
| Base clock rate (GHz) | P | 1.9 | |
| Base clock rate (GHz) | E | 1.5 | |
| Base clock rate (GHz) | LP-E | 1.5 | |
| Turbo Boost (GHz) | P | 4.7 | 4.6 |
| Turbo Boost (GHz) | E | 3.4 | 3.3 |
| Turbo Boost (GHz) | LP-E | 3.1 | |
| Graphics | Name | Arc B390 | Arc B370 |
| Graphics | Xe cores | 12 | 10 |
| Graphics | Max Turbo (GHz) | 2.3 | 2.2 |
| NPU (int8 TOPS) | | 46 | |
| Smart Cache | | 12 MB | |
| TDP | Min | 15 W | |
| TDP | Base | 25 W | |
| TDP | Turbo | 80 W | |
| TDP | Configurable | 8–35 W | 8–30 W |

== Starfire ==
Intel Starfire, announced in July 2026, is a variant of Panther Lake designed for use in spacecraft and orbital systems, supporting operational temperatures from -55°C to 125°C and offering a guaranteed 10-year lifetime. There are two SKUs with TDP of 10 and 35W.

== Reception ==
=== Panther Lake High Power ===
Panther Lake has been widely praised for its power-efficiency and integrated graphics performance, having been noted as a "return to form" for Intel.

=== Arc G3 ===
Reviews for the Intel Arc G3 and G3 Extreme processors have been extremely positive regarding graphics performance, with reviewers calling it the fastest and a highly capable silicon for gaming handhelds to date. However, the initial devices were heavily criticized for their high price point.

== See also ==
- List of Intel CPU microarchitectures
- List of Intel Core processors

| Atom (ULV) | | Node name | Pentium/Core | | | | | | |
| Microarch. | Step | Node name | Microarch. | Step | | | | | |
| | | 600 nm | P6 | Pentium Pro (133 MHz) | | | | | |
| | | 500 nm | P6 | Pentium Pro (150 MHz) | | | | | |
| | | 350 nm | P6 | Pentium Pro (166–200 MHz) | | | | | |
| | | 350 nm | P6 | Klamath | | | | | |
| | | 250 nm | P6 | Deschutes | | | | | |
| | | 250 nm | P6 | Katmai | NetBurst | | | | |
| | | 180 nm | P6 | Coppermine | Willamette | | | | |
| | | 130 nm | P6 | Tualatin | Northwood | | | | |
| | | 130 nm | Pentium M | Banias | Northwood | | NetBurst(HT) | | NetBurst(×2) |
| | | 90 nm | Pentium M | Dothan | Prescott | ⇨ | Prescott‑2M | ⇨ | Smithfield |
| | | 90 nm | Pentium M | Dothan | ~~Tejas~~ | → | ⇩ | → | ~~Cedarmill (Tejas)~~ |
| | | 65 nm | Pentium M | Yonah | ~~Nehalem (NetBurst)~~ | | Cedar Mill | ⇨ | Presler |
| | | 65 nm | Core | Merom | 4 cores on mainstream desktop, DDR3 introduced | | | | |
| Bonnell | Bonnell | 45 nm | Core | Penryn | | | | | |
| Bonnell | Bonnell | 45 nm | Nehalem | Nehalem | HT reintroduced, integrated MC, PCH; L3-cache introduced, 256 KB L2-cache/core | | | | |
| Bonnell | Saltwell | 32 nm | Nehalem | Westmere | Introduced GPU on same package and AES-NI | | | | |
| Bonnell | Saltwell | 32 nm | Sandy Bridge | Sandy Bridge | On-die ring bus, no more non-UEFI motherboards | | | | |
| Silvermont | Silvermont | 22 nm | Sandy Bridge | Ivy Bridge | | | | | |
| Silvermont | Silvermont | 22 nm | Haswell | Haswell | Fully integrated voltage regulator | | | | |
| Silvermont | Airmont | 14 nm | Haswell | Broadwell | | | | | |
| Silvermont | Airmont | 14 nm | Skylake | Skylake | DDR4 introduced on mainstream desktop | | | | |
| Goldmont | | 14 nm | Skylake | Kaby Lake | | | | | |
| Goldmont | | 14 nm | Skylake | Coffee Lake | 6 cores on mainstream desktop | | | | |
| Goldmont | | 14 nm | Skylake | Amber Lake | Mobile-only | | | | |
| Goldmont Plus | | 14 nm | Skylake | Whiskey Lake | Mobile-only | | | | |
| Goldmont Plus | | 14 nm | Skylake | Coffee Lake Refresh | 8 cores on mainstream desktop | | | | |
| Goldmont Plus | | 14 nm | Skylake | Comet Lake | 10 cores on mainstream desktop | | | | |
| Goldmont Plus | | 14 nm | Sunny Cove | Cypress Cove (Rocket Lake) | Backported Sunny Cove microarchitecture for 14 nm | | | | |
| Tremont | | 10 nm | Skylake | Palm Cove (Cannon Lake) | Mobile-only | | | | |
| Tremont | | 10 nm | Sunny Cove | Sunny Cove (Ice Lake) | 512 KB L2-cache/core | | | | |
| Tremont | | 10 nm | Sunny Cove | Willow Cove (Tiger Lake) | X^{e} graphics engine | | | | |
| Gracemont | | Intel 7 (10 nm ESF) | Golden Cove | Golden Cove (Alder Lake) | Hybrid, DDR5, PCIe 5.0 | | | | |
| Gracemont | | Intel 7 (10 nm ESF) | Golden Cove | Raptor Cove (Raptor Lake) | | | | | |
| Crestmont | | Intel 4 | Redwood Cove | Meteor Lake | Mobile-only; NPU, chiplet architecture | | | | |
| Crestmont | | Intel 3 | Redwood Cove | Arrow Lake-U | | | | | |
| Skymont | | TSMC N3B | Lion Cove | Lunar Lake | Low power mobile only (9–30 W) | | | | |
| Skymont | | TSMC N3B | Lion Cove | Arrow Lake | | | | | |
| Darkmont | | Intel 18A | Cougar Cove | Panther Lake | | | | | |
| Arctic Wolf | | Intel 18A and/or TSMC N2P | Coyote Cove | Nova Lake | | | | | |
