= Intel Arc =

Graphics processing unit brand

- Release date: March 30, 2022
- Manufactured by: TSMC
- Designed by: Intel
- Codenames: Alchemist; Battlemage; Celestial; Druid
- Architecture: Intel Xe
- Cores: Up to 32 X^{e} cores
- Transistors: Up to 21.7 billion
- Fabrication process: TSMC N5; TSMC N6

Cards
- Entry-level: Arc 3
- Mid-range: Arc 5
- High-end: Arc 7

API support
- OpenCL: 3.0 (Note: In OpenCL 3.0, OpenCL 1.2 functionality has become a mandatory baseline, while all OpenCL 2.x and OpenCL 3.0 features were made optional.)
- OpenGL: 4.6
- Vulkan: 1.3, 1.4
- DirectX: 12 Ultimate

History
- Predecessor: i740

Intel Arc is a brand of graphics processing units (GPUs) developed by Intel, representing the company's line of discrete GPUs for gaming, content creation, and professional applications. Arc GPUs are designed by Intel and manufactured under contract by TSMC. The brand also includes supporting graphics software and driver technologies, and is sold alongside Intel Graphics Technology, the company's line of integrated graphics processors, found in most of its processors.

Intel Arc competes with Nvidia's GeForce and AMD's Radeon products. The first generation, the Arc A-series, launched in 2022 with laptop GPUs debuting in March and desktop models such as the A750 and A770 following later that year.

The Arc Pro series for workstation use was introduced in August 2022, followed by the second-generation Battlemage (B-series) GPUs, announced in December 2024. The first model, the B580, was released later that month.

== Etymology ==
According to Intel, the brand is named after the concept of story arcs found in video games. Each generation of Arc is named after character classes sorted by each letter of the Latin alphabet in ascending order. They begin with A, then B, then C, and so on. The first generation is named Alchemist, while Battlemage, Celestial and Druid are the respective names for the second, third and fourth Arc generations.

== Graphics processor generations ==
=== Alchemist ===
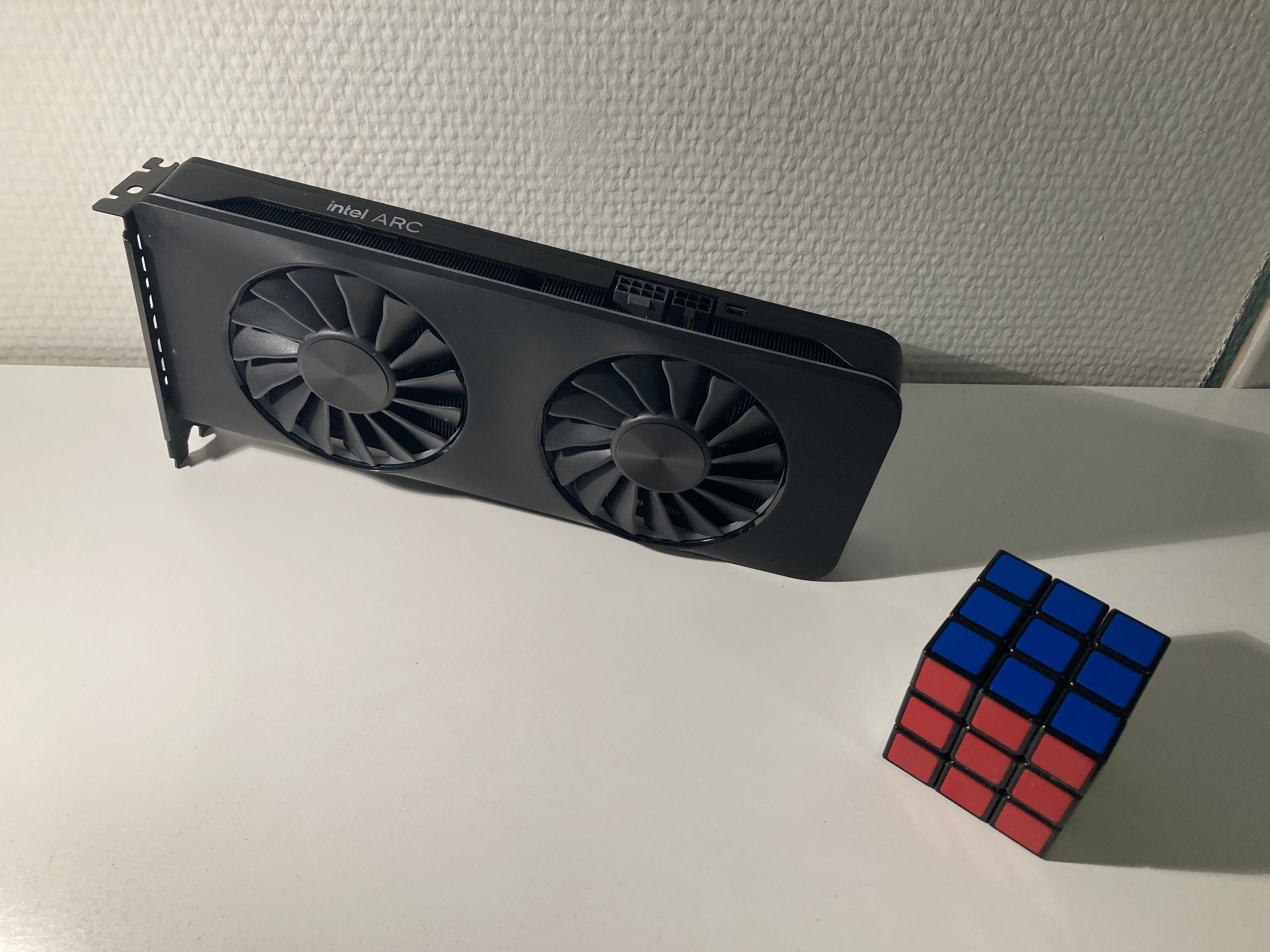
An Intel Arc A770 16 GB, the highest-end desktop GPU from Intel's first-generation Alchemist GPUs, with a Rubik's Cube for scale

Developed under the previous codename "DG2", the first generation of Intel Arc GPUs (codenamed "Alchemist") released on March 30, 2022. It comes in both add-on desktop card and laptop form factors. TSMC manufactures the die, using their N6 process.

Alchemist uses the Intel Xe GPU architecture, or more specifically, the Xe-HPG variant. Alchemist supports hardware-based ray tracing, XeSS or supersampling based on neural networks (similar to Nvidia's DLSS and AMD's FSR), and DirectX 12 Ultimate. Also supported are DisplayPort 2.0 and overclocking. AV1 fixed-function hardware encoder is included in Alchemist GPUs as part of the Intel Quick Sync Video core.

Intel confirmed ASTC support has been removed from hardware starting with Alchemist and future Arc GPU microarchitectures will also not support it.

Arc Alchemist does not support SR-IOV or Direct3D 9 natively, instead falling back on the D3D9On12 wrapper which translates Direct3D 9 calls to their Direct3D 12 equivalents.

Arc support OpenCL 3.0 (Note: In OpenCL 3.0, OpenCL 1.2 functionality has become a mandatory baseline, while all OpenCL 2.x and OpenCL 3.0 features were made optional.) for example, this GPU can work in the grid World Community Grid.

Display connections: DisplayPort 2.0 (40 Gbit/s bandwidth) and HDMI 2.1

==== Desktop ====
Overview of Intel Arc Alchemist GPUs
Branding and Model		Launch	MSRP (USD)	Code name	Process	Transistors (billion)	Die size (mm^{2})	Core config (Note: Shading cores (ALU): texture mapping units (TMU): render output units (ROP): ray tracing units (tensor cores (XMX): execution units: render slices))	L2 cache	Clock rate (MHz) (Note: Boost values (if available) are stated below the base value in italic.)	Fillrate		Memory					Processing power (TFLOPS)			TDP	Bus interface
Branding and Model		Launch	MSRP (USD)	Code name	Process	Transistors (billion)	Die size (mm^{2})	Core config	L2 cache	Clock rate (MHz)	Pixel (GP/s)	Texture (GT/s)	Type	Size (GB)	Bandwidth (GB/s)	Bus width	Clock (MT/s)	Half precision (base)	Single precision (base)	Double precision (base)	TDP	Bus interface
Arc 3	A310	Sep 28, 2022	$110	ACM-G11 (DG2-128)	TSMC; N6	7.2	157	6 Xe cores 768:32:16:6 (192:96:2)	4 MB	2000; 2000	32	64	GDDR6	4 GB	124	64-bit	15500	6.144	3.072	n/a	75 W	PCIe 4.0 x8
Arc 3	A380	Jun 14, 2022	$139	ACM-G11 (DG2-128)	TSMC; N6	7.2	157	8 Xe cores 1024:64:32:8 (256:128:2)	4 MB	2000; 2050	64; 65.6	128; 131.2	GDDR6	6 GB	186	96-bit	15500	8.192; 8.3968	4.096; 4.1984	n/a n/a	75 W	PCIe 4.0 x8
Arc 5	A580	Oct 10, 2023	$179	ACM-G10 (DG2-512)	TSMC; N6	21.7	406	24 Xe cores 3072:192:96:24 (768:384:6)	8 MB	1700; 1700	163.2	326.4	GDDR6	8 GB	512	256-bit	16000	20.890	10.445	n/a	175 W	PCIe 4.0 x16
Arc 7	A750	Oct 14, 2022	$289	ACM-G10 (DG2-512)	TSMC; N6	21.7	406	28 Xe cores 3584:224:112:28 (896:448:7)	16 MB	2050; 2400	229.6; 268.8	393.6; 460.8	GDDR6	8 GB	512	256-bit	16000	29.3888; 34.4064	14.6944; 17.2032	n/a n/a	225 W	PCIe 4.0 x16
Arc 7	A770 8GB	Oct 14, 2022	$329	ACM-G10 (DG2-512)	TSMC; N6	21.7	406	32 Xe cores 4096:256:128:32 (1024:512:8)	16 MB	2100; 2400	268.8; 307.2	537.6; 614.4	GDDR6	8 GB	512	256-bit	16000	34.4064; 39.3216	17.2032; 19.6608	n/a n/a	225 W	PCIe 4.0 x16
Arc 7	A770 16GB	Oct 14, 2022	$349	ACM-G10 (DG2-512)	TSMC; N6	21.7	406	32 Xe cores 4096:256:128:32 (1024:512:8)	16 MB	2100; 2400	268.8; 307.2	537.6; 614.4	GDDR6	16 GB	560	256-bit	17500	34.4064; 39.3216	17.2032; 19.6608	n/a n/a	225 W	PCIe 4.0 x16

==== Mobile ====
Overview of Intel Arc Alchemist GPUs for mobile devices
Branding and Model		Launch	Code name	Process	Transistors (billion)	Die size (mm^{2})	Core config (Note: Shading cores (ALU): texture mapping units (TMU): render output units (ROP): ray tracing units (tensor cores (XMX): execution units: render slices)) (Note: Texture fillrate is calculated as the number of texture mapping units (TMUs) multiplied by the base (or boost) core clock speed.)	L2 cache	Core clock (MHz) (Note: Boost values (if available) are stated below the base value in italic.)	Fillrate (Note: Pixel fillrate is calculated as the lowest of three numbers: number of ROPs multiplied by the base core clock speed, number of rasterizers multiplied by the number of fragments they can generate per rasterizer multiplied by the base core clock speed, and the number of streaming multiprocessors multiplied by the number of fragments per clock that they can output multiplied by the base clock rate.)		Memory					Processing power (TFLOPS)			TDP	Bus interface
Branding and Model		Launch	Code name	Process	Transistors (billion)	Die size (mm^{2})	Core config	L2 cache	Core clock (MHz)	Pixel (GP/s)	Texture (GT/s)	Type	Size	Bandwidth (GB/s)	Bus width	Clock (MT/s)	Half precision	Single precision	Double precision	TDP	Bus interface
Arc 3	A350M	Mar 30, 2022	ACM-G11 (DG2-128)	TSMC; N6	7.2	157	6 Xe cores 768:48:24:6 (96:96:2)	4 MB	1150; 2200	27.6; 52.8	55.2; 105.6	GDDR6	4 GB	112	64-bit	14000	3.5328; 6.7584	1.7664; 3.3792	0.4416; 0.8448	25–35 W	PCIe 4.0 ×8
Arc 3	A370M	Mar 30, 2022	ACM-G11 (DG2-128)	TSMC; N6	7.2	157	8 Xe cores 1024:64:32:8 (128:128:2)	4 MB	1550; 2050	49.6; 65.6	99.2; 131.2	GDDR6	4 GB	112	64-bit	14000	6.3488; 8.3968	3.1744; 4.1984	0.7936; 1.0496	35–50 W	PCIe 4.0 ×8
Arc 5	A530M	Q3 2023	ACM-G12 (DG2-256)	TSMC; N6			12 Xe cores 1536:96:48:12 (192:192:3)	8 MB	1300			GDDR6	4 GB; 8 GB	224	128-bit	14000				65–95 W	PCIe 4.0 ×8
Arc 5	A550M	Q2 2022	ACM-G10 (DG2-512)	TSMC; N6	21.7	406	16 Xe cores 2048:128:64:16 (256:256:4)	8 MB	900; 1700	57.6; 108.8	115.2; 217.6	GDDR6	8 GB	224	128-bit	14000	7.3728; 13.9264	3.6864; 6.9632	0.9216; 1.7408	60–80 W	PCIe 4.0 ×8
Arc 5	A570M	Q3 2023	ACM-G12 (DG2-256)	TSMC; N6			16 Xe cores 2048:128:64:16 (256:256:4)	8 MB	1300			GDDR6	8 GB	224	128-bit	14000				75–95 W	PCIe 4.0 ×8
Arc 7	A730M	Q2 2022	ACM-G10 (DG2-512)	TSMC; N6	21.7	406	24 Xe cores 3072:192:96:24 (384:384:6)	12 MB	1100; 2050	105.6; 196.8	211.2; 393.6	GDDR6	12 GB	336	192-bit	14000	13.5168; 25.1904	6.7584; 12.5952	1.6896; 3.1488	80–120 W	PCIe 4.0 ×16
Arc 7	A770M	Q2 2022	ACM-G10 (DG2-512)	TSMC; N6	21.7	406	32 Xe cores 4096:256:128:32 (512:512:8)	16 MB	1650; 2050	211.2; 262.4	422.4; 524.8	GDDR6	16 GB	512	256-bit	16000	27.0336; 33.5872	13.5168; 16.7936	3.3792; 4.1984	120–150 W	PCIe 4.0 ×16

==== Workstation ====
Overview of Intel Arc Alchemist GPUs for Workstations
Branding and Model		Launch	Code name	Process	Transistors (billion)	Die size (mm^{2})	Core config (Note: Shading cores (ALU): texture mapping units (TMU): render output units (ROP): ray tracing units (tensor cores (XMX): execution Units: render slices))	L2 cache	Core clock (MHz) (Note: Boost values (if available) are stated below the base value in italic.)	Fillrate (Note: Pixel fillrate is calculated as the lowest of three numbers: number of ROPs multiplied by the base core clock speed, number of rasterizers multiplied by the number of fragments they can generate per rasterizer multiplied by the base core clock speed, and the number of streaming multiprocessors multiplied by the number of fragments per clock that they can output multiplied by the base clock rate.) (Note: Texture fillrate is calculated as the number of texture mapping units (TMUs) multiplied by the base (or boost) core clock speed.)		Memory					Processing power (TFLOPS)			TDP	Bus interface
Branding and Model		Launch	Code name	Process	Transistors (billion)	Die size (mm^{2})	Core config	L2 cache	Core clock (MHz)	Pixel (GP/s)	Texture (GT/s)	Type	Size	Bandwidth (GB/s)	Bus width	Clock (MT/s)	Half precision	Single precision	Double precision	TDP	Bus interface
Arc Pro	A30M	Aug 8, 2022	ACM-G11 (DG2-128)	TSMC; N6	7.2	157	8 Xe cores 1024:64:32:8 (128:128:2)	4 MB	1550			GDDR6	4 GB	112	64-bit	14000		4.20		50 W	PCIe 4.0 x8
Arc Pro	A40	Aug 8, 2022	ACM-G11 (DG2-128)	TSMC; N6	7.2	157	8 Xe cores 1024:64:32:8 (128:128:2)	4 MB	1550			GDDR6	6 GB	192	96-bit	16000		5.02		50 W	PCIe 4.0 x8
Arc Pro	A50	Aug 8, 2022	ACM-G11 (DG2-128)	TSMC; N6	7.2	157	8 Xe cores 1024:64:32:8 (128:128:2)	4 MB	2050			GDDR6	6 GB	192	96-bit	16000		5.02		75 W	PCIe 4.0 x8
Arc Pro	A60M	June 6, 2023	ACM-G12 (DG2-256)	TSMC; N6			16 Xe cores 2048:128:64:16 (256:256:4)		1300			GDDR6	8 GB	256	128-bit	16000		9.42		95 W	PCIe 4.0 x16
Arc Pro	A60	June 6, 2023	ACM-G12 (DG2-256)	TSMC; N6			16 Xe cores 2048:128:64:16 (256:256:4)		2000			GDDR6	12 GB	384	192-bit	16000		10.04		130 W	PCIe 4.0 x16

=== Battlemage ===
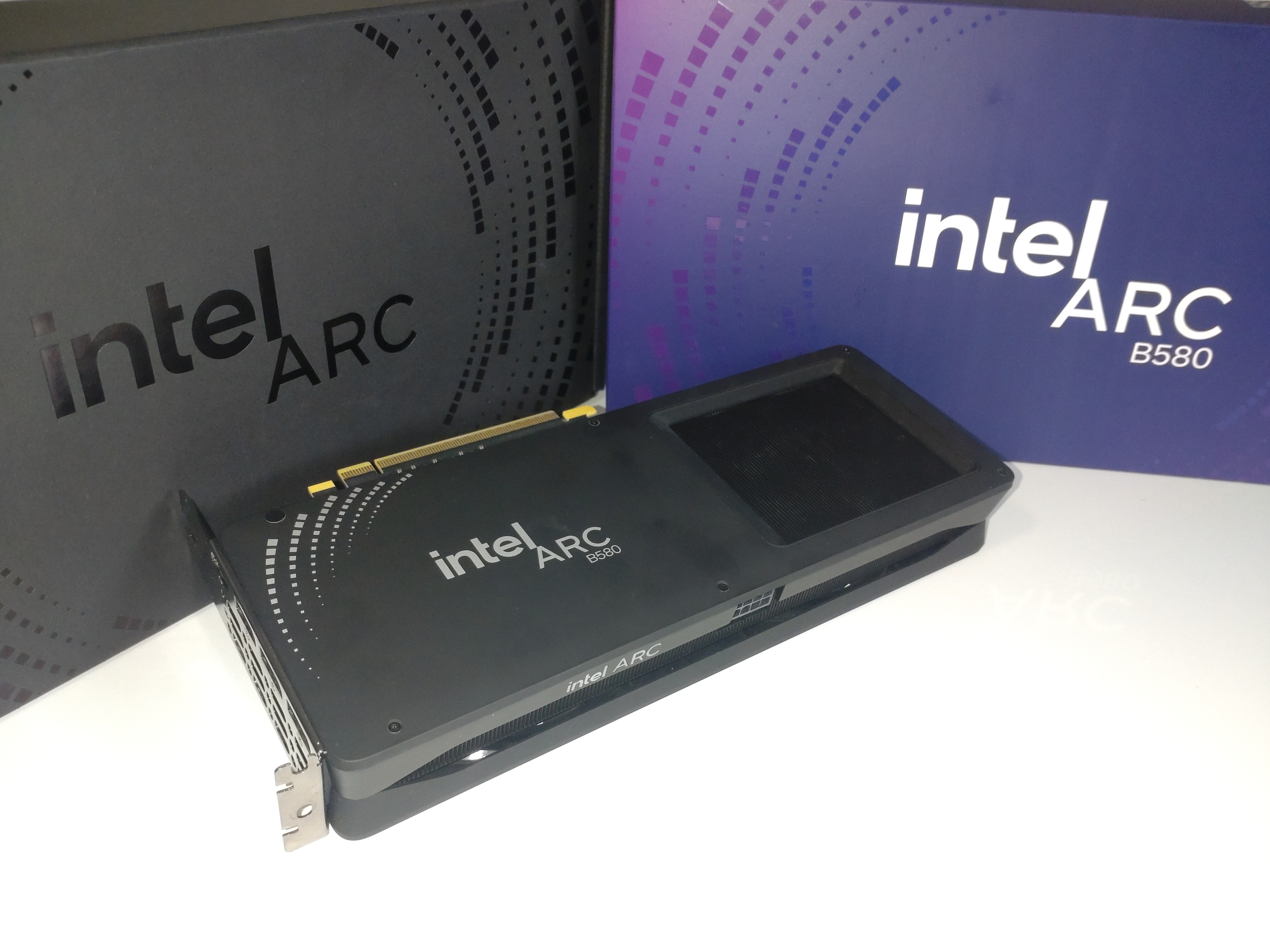
An Intel Arc Battlemage B580 Limited Edition graphics card with its box and inner box as background

Battlemage (X^{e}2) is the second-generation X^{e} architecture that debuted with its low power variant in Lunar Lake mobile processors that released in September 2024. On December 3, 2024, Intel announced two Arc B-Series desktop graphics cards based on the X^{e}2-HPG graphics architecture.

==== Desktop ====
Overview of Intel Arc Battlemage GPUs
Branding and Model		Launch	MSRP (USD)	Code name	Process	Transistors (billion)	Die size (mm^{2})	Core		Cache		Memory					Fillrate (Note: Pixel fillrate is calculated as the number of render output units (ROPs) multiplied by the base (or boost) core clock speed.) (Note: Texture fillrate is calculated as the number of texture mapping units (TMUs) multiplied by the base (or boost) core clock speed.)		Processing power (TFLOPS)			TDP	Bus interface
Branding and Model		Launch	MSRP (USD)	Code name	Process	Transistors (billion)	Die size (mm^{2})	Core Config (Note: X^{e}2-HPG Cores (X^{e} Vector Engines) Unified Shaders : Texture Mapping Units : Render Output Units : Ray Tracing Cores : XMX Cores)	Clock (MHz) (Note: Boost values (if available) are stated below the base value in italics.)	L1	L2	Type	Size	Bandwidth (GB/s)	Bus width	Clock (MT/s)	Pixel (GP/s)	Texture (GT/s)	Half precision	Single precision	Double precision	TDP	Bus interface
Arc 5	B570	Jan 16, 2025	$219	BMG-G21	TSMC N5	19.6	272	18 X^{e} Cores (144); 2304:144:72:18:144 (128:128:5)	1700; 2500	4.5 MB	10 MB	GDDR6	10 GB	380	160-bit	19000	122.4 200.0	244.8; 360.0	23.04	11.52	1.44	150 W	PCIe 4.0 x8
Arc 5	B580	Dec 13, 2024	$249	BMG-G21	TSMC N5	19.6	272	20 X^{e} Cores (160); 2560:160:80:20:160 (160:160:5)	1700; 2670	5 MB	12 MB	GDDR6	12 GB	456	192-bit	19000	136.0; 213.6	272.0; 427.2	27.34	13.67	1.709	190 W	PCIe 4.0 x8

==== Workstation ====
Overview of Intel Arc Battlemage GPUs for Workstations
Branding and Model		Launch	MSRP (USD)	Code name	Process	Transistors (billion)	Die size (mm^{2})	Core		L2 cache	Fillrate (Note: Pixel fillrate is calculated as the lowest of three numbers: number of ROPs multiplied by the base core clock speed, number of rasterizers multiplied by the number of fragments they can generate per rasterizer multiplied by the base core clock speed, and the number of streaming multiprocessors multiplied by the number of fragments per clock that they can output multiplied by the base clock rate.) (Note: Texture fillrate is calculated as the number of texture mapping units (TMUs) multiplied by the base (or boost) core clock speed.)		Memory					Processing power (TFLOPS)				TDP	Bus interface
Branding and Model		Launch	MSRP (USD)	Code name	Process	Transistors (billion)	Die size (mm^{2})	Config (Note: Shading cores (ALU): texture mapping units (TMU): render output units (ROP): ray tracing units (tensor cores (XMX): execution Units: render slices))	Clock (MHz) (Note: Boost values (if available) are stated below the base value in italic.)	L2 cache	Pixel (GP/s)	Texture (GT/s)	Type	Size	Bandwidth (GB/s)	Bus width	Clock (MT/s)	Half precision	Single precision	Double precision	XMX Half Precision	TDP	Bus interface
Arc Pro	B50	Sept 3, 2025	$349	BMG-G21	TSMC N5	19.6	272	16 Xe2-cores; 2048:128:64:16:128 (128:128:4)	1700; 2600	4 MB	87; 133	218; 332.8	GDDR6	16 GB	224	128-bit	14000	21.3	10.65	1.33	170	70 W	PCIe 5.0 x8
Arc Pro	B60	Q3 2025	$599	BMG-G21	TSMC N5	19.6	272	20 Xe2-cores; 2560:160:80:20:160 (160:160:5)	2400	18 MB	192	384	GDDR6	24 GB	456	192-bit	19000	24.5	12.8	1.54	197	120-200 W	PCIe 5.0 x8
Arc Pro	B65	Q1 2026	?	BMG-G31	TSMC N5	27.7	368	20 Xe2-cores; 2560:160:80:20:160 (160:160:5)	2400	18 MB	192	384	GDDR6	32 GB	608	256-bit	19000	24.56	12.28	1.54	197	200 W	PCIe 5.0 x16
Arc Pro	B70	Q1 2026	$949	BMG-G31	TSMC N5	27.7	368	32 Xe2-cores; 4096:256:128:32:256 (256:256:8)	2280; 2800	24 MB		583; 716.8	GDDR6	32 GB	608	256-bit	19000	45.8	22.94		367	230 W	PCIe 5.0 x16

=== Future generations ===
Intel has revealed future generations of Intel Arc GPUs under development: Celestial (X^{e}3P), and Druid (X^{e}4). Additionally, Panther Lake series iGPUs will be based on the Xe3 architecture.

== Intel XeSS ==
Intel XeSS is a real-time deep learning image upsampling technology developed primarily for use in video games as a competitor to Nvidia's DLSS and AMD's FSR technologies. Additionally, XeSS is not restricted to Arc graphics cards, similar to FSR. It utilizes XMX instructions exclusive to Arc graphics cards, but will fall back to utilizing DP4a instructions on competing GPUs that have support for DP4a instructions. XeSS is trained with 64 samples per pixel as opposed to Nvidia DLSS's 16 samples per pixel (16K reference images). XeSS 3 supports Multi-Frame Generation (MFG), similar to DLSS 4. This feature is exclusive to Intel Arc graphics cards, and will be supported on both Arc Battlemage and Alchemist series cards. Games that support XeSS 2 will support XeSS 3 at launch of XeSS 3.

Standard XeSS quality presets (Note: The client may set custom input and output resolutions rather than using a preset.)
Quality preset	1.3+		1.0-1.2	
Quality preset	Scale factor (Note: The linear scale factor used for upsampling the input resolution to the output resolution. For example, a scene rendered at 540p with a 2.00× scale factor would have an output resolution of 1080p.)	Render scale (Note: The linear render scale, compared to the output resolution, that the technology uses to render scenes internally before upsampling. For example, a 1080p scene with a 50% render scale would have an internal resolution of 540p.)	Scale factor	Render scale
Native Anti-Aliasing (Note: New presets defined in version 1.3.)	1.00x	100%	N/A	
Ultra Quality Plus	1.30x	77.0%	N/A	
Ultra Quality	1.50×	66.7%	1.30x	77.0%
Quality	1.70×	58.8%	1.50x	66.7%
Balanced	2.00×	50.0%	1.70x	58.8%
Performance	2.30×	43.5%	2.00x	50.0%
Ultra Performance	3.00×	33.3%	N/A	

== Issues ==
=== Drivers ===
Performance on Intel Arc GPUs has suffered from poor driver support, particularly at launch. An investigation by Gamers Nexus discovered 43 known driver issues with Arc GPUs, prompting a response and acknowledgement of the issues from Intel. Intel CEO Pat Gelsinger also blamed driver problems as a reason for Arc's delayed launch. A beta driver from October 2022 accidentally reduced the memory clock by 9% on the Arc A770 from 2187 MHz to 2000 MHz, resulting in a 17% reduction in memory bandwidth. This particular issue was later fixed. Intel provides an open source driver for Linux. Intel does not officially support Intel Arc for Windows Server operating systems, except the Intel Arc Pro.

=== DirectX 9 compatibility ===
As of the Alchemist generation, Arc only includes direct hardware support for the DirectX 11 & 12 and Vulkan graphics APIs, with the older DirectX 9 & 10 and OpenGL APIs being supported via a real-time compatibility layer built into Intel's graphics driver. As a result, Alchemist GPUs perform noticeably worse than competing Nvidia and AMD GPUs in software that can only use these older APIs, including multiple DirectX 9-based esports games such as Counter-Strike: Global Offensive, League of Legends and StarCraft II: Wings of Liberty. There is also a performance gap between DirectX 11 and DirectX 12.

A December 2022 driver update improved Arc compatibility and performance with DirectX 9-based games. According to Intel, the driver update made Arc GPUs up to 1.8x faster in DirectX 9 games. A February 2023 driver update further improved Arc's performance on DirectX 9-based games.

=== Legacy BIOS compatibility ===
Intel Arc requires a UEFI BIOS with resizable BAR support for optimal performance. UEFI Class 1 and Class 2 BIOS are not supported by Intel Arc.

=== HW Design Limitations ===
The Intel Arc A and B series does not support dynamic VRAM clocking at idle like AMD Radeon and Nvidia GPUs. Instead, the VRAM continues to run at its maximum stock speed even when the system is not under load and they consume more energy when idle.
