= Surface Hub 2S =

Whiteboard developed by Microsoft

- Developer: Microsoft
- Manufacturer: Microsoft
- Product family: Surface
- Type: Interactive whiteboard for business
- Generation: 2nd
- Released: 2019; 7 years ago
- Introductory price: US$8,999
- Operating system: Windows 10 Team
- CPU: 8th-generation Intel Core i5
- Memory: 8GB
- Storage: 128GB SSD
- Display: 120 Hz refresh rate, 3:2 aspect ratio and 100-point multi-touch sensor Resolution; 3840×2560 (50in) screen 3840x2160 (85in) screen
- Graphics: Intel UHD Graphics 620
- Sound: Front facing 3-way stereo speakers
- Input: Sensors: passive infrared presence, imaging, ambient light and depth sensors
- Controller input: Surface Pen
- Connectivity: Wireless: 802.11 a/b/g/n/ac Wi-Fi; Bluetooth 4.1; Miracast; Ports: 4x USB-C USB-A; Mini-DisplayPort Video Output; RJ45 Gigabit Ethernet; HDMI Video Input USB-C with DisplayPort Input
- Online services: Microsoft Store, OneDrive, Microsoft Teams, Xbox Games, Microsoft Movies & TV
- Dimensions: 43.2 inches (110 cm) (width); 29.2 inches (74 cm) (height); 3.0 inches (76 mm) (depth)
- Weight: 61.6 kilograms (136 lb) (50 in model); 84 kilograms (185 lb) (85 in model)
- Predecessor: Surface Hub
- Successor: Surface Hub 3
- Website: www.microsoft.com/microsoft-surface-hub

The Surface Hub 2S is the second generation of the interactive whiteboard developed and marketed by Microsoft, as part of the Microsoft Surface family. Like the first-generation Surface Hub, the Hub 2S can be wall-mounted or roller-stand-mounted.

The device is available in a 50 inches (130 cm) and a 85 inches (220 cm) display size, each with a 120 Hz refresh rate 4K touchscreen with multi-touch and multi-pen capabilities, running the Windows 10 operating system.

Surface Hub 2S was succeeded in 2023 by Surface Hub 3.

== Features ==
=== Hardware ===
Surface Hub 2S uses the 8th-generation Intel Core i5 processor and runs the 64-bit version of Windows 10. The device supports 3840 × 2560 4K resolution and contains an Intel UHD Graphics 620 controller integrated in the CPU.

Unlike the first-generation Surface Hub models, the Hub 2S comes with a new Surface Hub 2 Camera separate from the device which can be plugged into any USB-C port on the side of the device. The camera produces video at 2160p (4K) resolution at 30 fps with anti-flicker and face based auto exposure.

=== Software ===
Surface Hub 2S devices ran Windows 10 Team. Depending on their software version and configuration, they supported Microsoft Teams, Skype for Business, or both. The Surface Hub 2S welcome screen provided Call, Whiteboard, and Connect actions, with Connect supporting Miracast.

== Configurations ==
Configurations
Screen Size	Price tier (USD)	CPU	GPU	Internal storage	RAM
50 inch	$8,999	Quad-core 8th Generation Intel Core i5 processor	Intel UHD Graphics 620	128 GB	8 GB
85 inch	$21,999.99	Quad-core 8th Generation Intel Core i5 processor	Intel UHD Graphics 620	128 GB	8 GB

== Timeline of Surface family ==
Timeline of Surface devices
Sources: Microsoft Devices Blog Microsoft Surface Store Microsoft Surface for Business store
