= Surface Hub 3 =

Interactive whiteboard designed by Microsoft

- Developer: Microsoft
- Product family: Surface
- Type: Interactive whiteboard for business
- Generation: 3rd
- Released: October 3, 2023; 2 years ago
- Introductory price: 50-inch: US$9,499.99; 85-inch: US$22,999.99
- Operating system: Microsoft Windows
- Memory: 32 GB
- Storage: 512 GB SSD
- Controller input: Surface Pen
- Dimensions: 50-inch model: 43.2 inches (110 cm) w; 29.2 inches (74 cm) h; 3.0 inches (76 mm) d; 85-inch model: 77.1 inches (196 cm) w; 44.5 inches (113 cm) h; 3.4 inches (86 mm) d
- Predecessor: Surface Hub 2S
- Website: www.microsoft.com/microsoft-surface-hub

The Surface Hub 3 is an interactive whiteboard designed, developed, and marketed by Microsoft. It is part of the third-generation of the Surface Hub, succeeding the Surface Hub 2 and 2S.

== Timeline ==
Timeline of Surface devices
Sources: Microsoft Devices Blog Microsoft Surface Store Microsoft Surface for Business store

Preceded by Surface Hub 2	Surface Hub; 3rd generation	Most recent
