= Perceptive Pixel =

Division of Microsoft

Perceptive Pixel, Inc.
- Type: Division of Microsoft
- Industry: Large-scale multi-touch display technology, education, broadcast, meetings and collaboration
- Founded: 2006; 20 years ago
- Defunct: 2012
- Headquarters: Redmond, Washington
- Number of locations: 2 offices (2014)
- Key people: Jefferson Han (founder, general manager)
- Parent: Microsoft
- Website: www.perceptivepixel.com

Perceptive Pixel was a developer and producer of multi-touch interfaces. It was purchased by Microsoft in 2012. Its technology is now used in fields including broadcast, defense, geo-intelligence, energy exploration, industrial design and medical imaging.

== Background ==
The company begain in 2006 as Perceptive Pixel, Inc., headquartered in New York City and maintaining offices in Mountain View, Portland, and Washington, D.C. Prior to the company's establishment, founder Jeff Han publicly demonstrated multitouch hardware and software technology at a TED conference in February 2006. The company was founded later in the same year. Subsequently, it shipped its first Multi-Touch Workstation and larger Multi-Touch Collaboration Wall in 2007. The latter gained widespread recognition for transforming the way CNN covered the 2008 US Presidential elections. In 2009, the Smithsonian awarded Perceptive Pixel the National Design Award in the inaugural category of Interaction Design. Throughout its history as a startup company, Perceptive Pixel had focused on ultra-high-end touch displays that were sold to large businesses in key niches.

== Microsoft acquisition ==
On July 9, 2012, Microsoft CEO Steve Ballmer announced that they would acquire Perceptive Pixel Inc. in a transaction that closed three weeks later on July 31. At that year's WPC conference, Ballmer stated the company hoped to use its newly acquired technology to enhance its Windows 8 operating system. Han also stated that the sale could allow their products to be more broadly available.

On January 21, 2015, Microsoft announced the Surface Hub during its Windows 10 launch. The new product was described as a next-generation device under the Surface brand and was developed by members of the Perceptive Pixel team.
