= Multi-Touch Collaboration Wall =

Large multi-touch monitor

- Manufacturer: Perceptive Pixel
- Display: Touch screen
- Touchpad: Yes
- Dimensions: 8 ft (240 cm) x 3 ft (91 cm)
- Successor: Surface Hub

The Multi-Touch Collaboration Wall is a large (81 inch width x 48 inch height) monitor invented by Jeff Han that employs multi-touch technology, and is marketed by Han's company, Perceptive Pixel. Han initially developed the technology for military applications. The wall has received most of its publicity because of its use by news network CNN during its coverage of the 2008 US presidential election. Usually operated by John King, it is often referred to as CNN's "Magic Wall", or the "Magic Map".

Walls have been sold not only to CNN but to the US Military, as well as other government agencies Han has not named. The wall appeared in a catalog for upscale department store, Neiman Marcus.

== Use on CNN ==
The screen was purchased by CNN after David Bohrman, who is in charge of CNN's coverage of politics, "fell in love" with the device at a military intelligence show. Its programming is modified by CNN's Joshua Braun and his team of producers for specific uses, and CNN recently purchased additional walls for a total of eight across the company.

Its primary use has been during CNN's election coverage. Its first use was during CNN's coverage of the 2008 Democratic and Republican Iowa caucuses in January of that year; CNN has used the wall during its coverage of every successive primary contest in the 2008 primary season. Bohrman originally wanted to delay use of the monitor until the general election, but decided that the technology was "too good to wait". Part of its appeal is its ability to make the numbers and data more accessible to its viewers, and to relay them visually, as many viewers lose interest in merely verbal explanations.

The software allows the user to access, manipulate and project data related to current poll results, and election results of the past and present. For instance, the user could bring up the total delegate counts for Senators Barack Obama (D-IL) and Hillary Clinton (D-NY) during the 2008 US Democratic primary race. He could bring a map of the state that was then having a primary election, collect live vote tallies, or bring up pie charts for vote distribution in each county. He could project how voting in a particular county could affect who won the state. For the national presidential election, it can be used to display a map reflecting recent state-by-state poll results, which are also used to project electoral vote totals for each respective party. Current toss-up states can also be assigned Democratic or Republican status to create hypothetical election scenarios.

Particular attention has been paid to John King's proficiency with the wall, and he is described as a "specialist" in using it. He is sometimes referred to as "the map guy," "the wall magician" or the "chairman of the board." Many news stories about the wall dedicate equal focus to King himself.

The Magic Map was parodied in the October 23, 2008 episode of Saturday Night Live Weekend Update Thursday, with Fred Armisen using it to comically rearrange states. King commented later that he could perform that act as well. The Map was also parodied on the November 18, 2008 episode of The Daily Show with Jon Stewart, with a presumably omnipotent King using it to stalk, and eventually imprison, correspondent John Oliver. A Bud Light "drinkability" commercial also spoofs the Magic Map technology.

== Use on CNN-News 18 ==
It was used for the Lok Sabha Elections in India by CNN-News18.
