= Jefferson Han =

American computer scientist (born 1975)

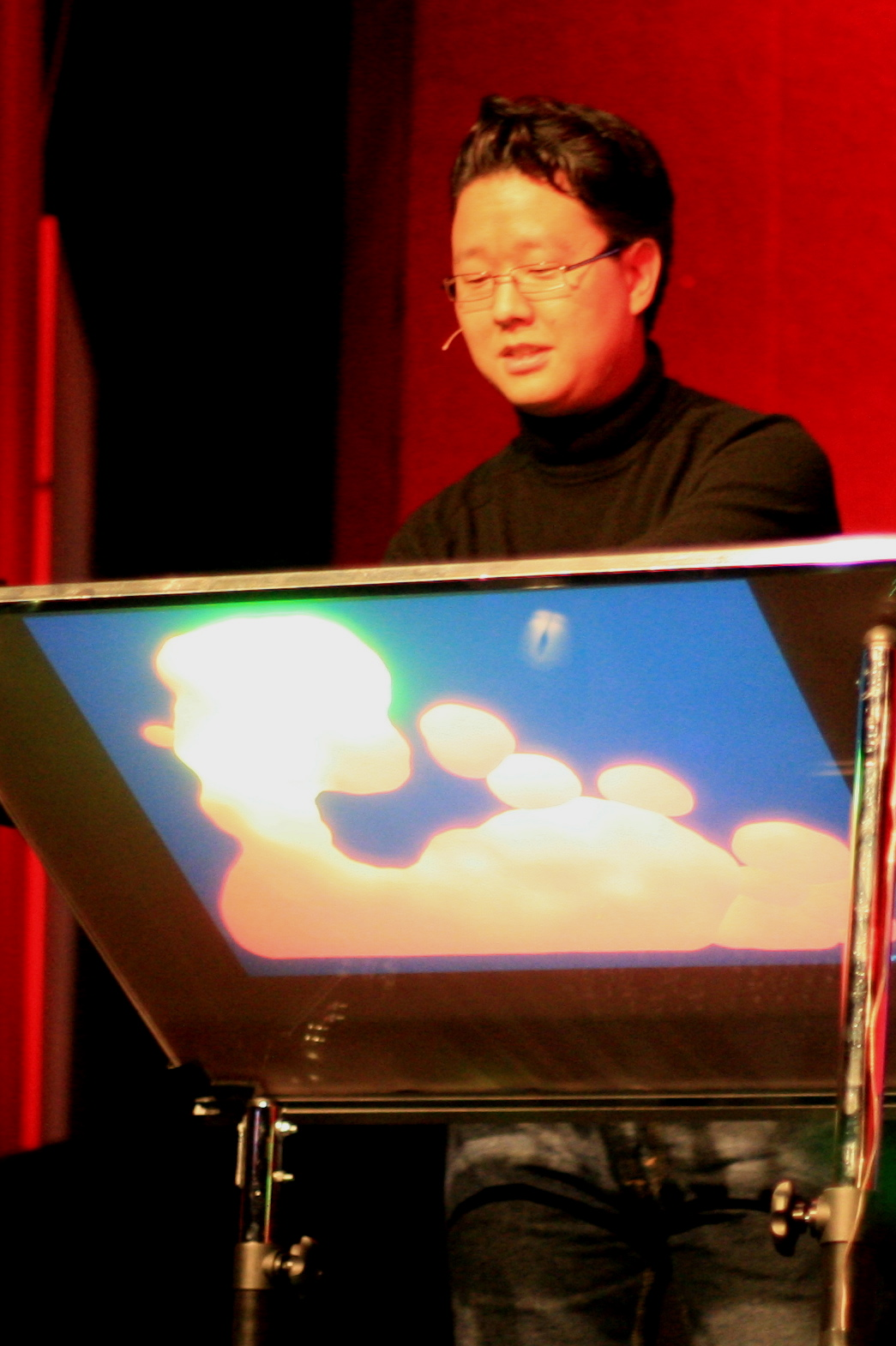
Han debuting his initial multi-touch system at TED 2006.

Jefferson Y. "Jeff" Han (born 1975) is an American computer scientist who worked for New York University's (NYU) Courant Institute of Mathematical Sciences until 2006. He is one of the main developers of "multi-touch sensing", which, unlike older touch-screen interfaces, is able to recognize multiple points of contact.

Han also works on other projects in the fields of autonomous robot navigation, motion capture, real-time computer graphics, and human-computer interaction.

== Career ==
He presented his multi-touch sensing work in February 2006 at the TED (Technology Entertainment Design) Conference in Monterey, California. TED released the video online six months later and it spread quickly on YouTube.

Han founded a company called Perceptive Pixel to develop his touch screen technology further, and he has already shipped touch screens to parts of the military. Han's technology has been featured most notably as the "Magic Wall" on CNN's Election Center coverage. Han's company was acquired by Microsoft in 2012, where he became Partner General Manager of Perceptive Pixel (later Surface Hub). Han left Microsoft in late 2015, shortly before Surface Hub's launch.

== Personal life ==
He is the son of middle-class Korean immigrants who emigrated to the United States in the 1970s.

== Education ==
Han originally attended the Osmond A. Church Public Elementary School in South Ozone Park Queens. He later graduated from The Dalton School in Manhattan in 1993 and studied computer science and electrical engineering for three years at Cornell University before leaving to join a start-up company to commercialize the CU-SeeMe video-conferencing software that he helped develop while an undergraduate at Cornell.

== Honors ==
Han was named to Time magazine's 2008 listing of the "100 Most Influential People in The World".

== See also ==
FingerWorks
