= Surface Hub =

Interactive whiteboard developed by Microsoft

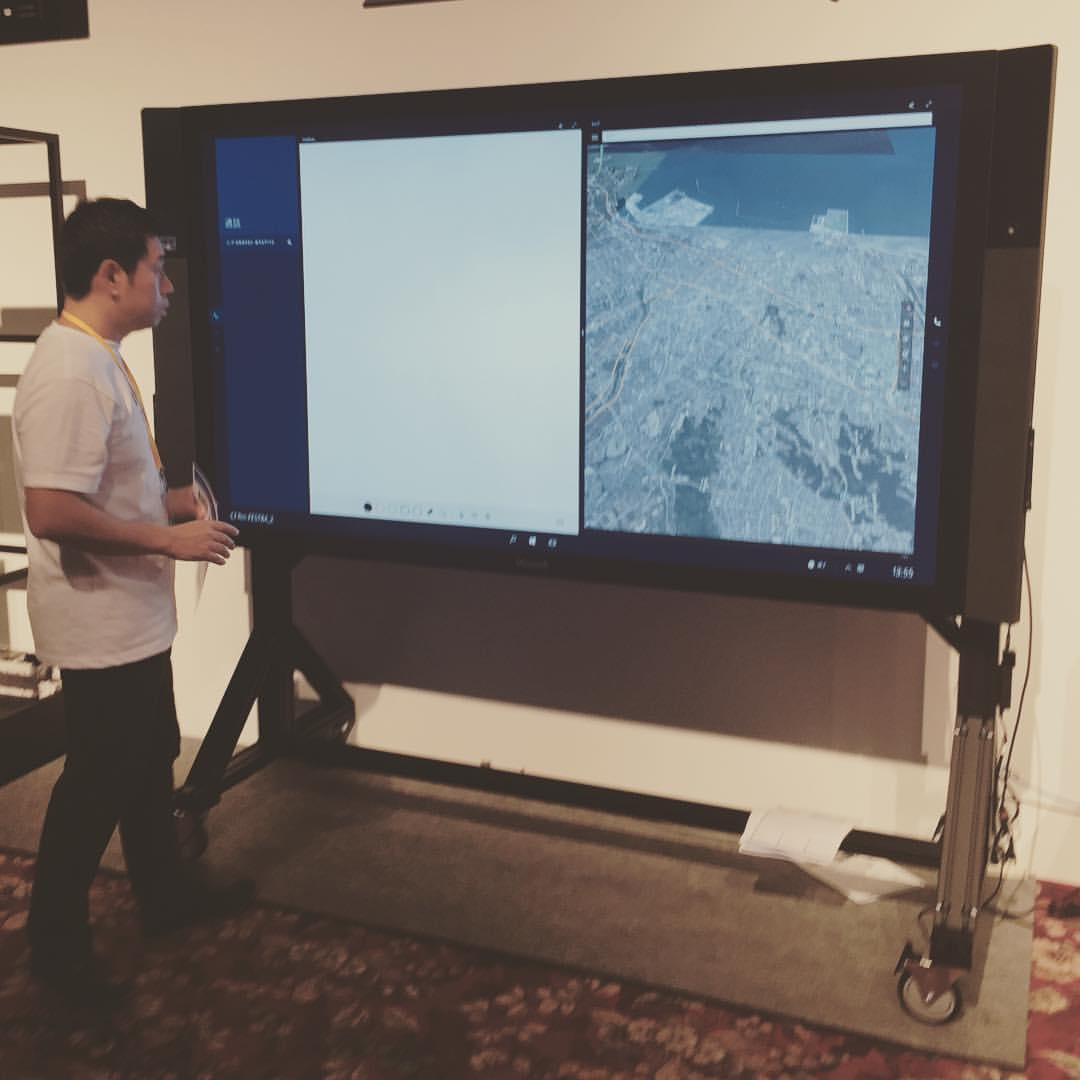
- Surface Hub
- Developer: Microsoft
- Manufacturer: Microsoft
- Product family: Surface
- Type: Interactive whiteboard for business
- Generation: 2nd
- Released: June 1, 2015; 11 years ago
- Introductory price: 55-inch: US$8,999; US$1,449 (Device stand); US$1,400 (for battery); 84-inch: US$22,700; US$2,922 (Device stand); US$60 (for Surface Keyboard); US$107 (for Surface Pen)
- Operating system: Windows 10 Team
- CPU: 55-inch: 4th-gen Intel Core i5; 84-inch: 4th-gen Intel Core i7
- Memory: 8 GB DDR3
- Storage: 128 GB SSD
- Display: 120 Hz refresh rate; 16:9 aspect ratio; 100-point multi-touch sensor; Resolution: 55-inch: 55 inches (140 cm) 1920×1080; 84-inch: 84 inches (210 cm) 3840×2160
- Graphics: 55-inch: Intel HD Graphics 4600; 84-inch: Nvidia Quadro K2200
- Sound: Dual front-facing speakers; Quad microphone array
- Input: Sensors: passive infrared presence; imaging; ambient light; depth sensors
- Controller input: Surface Pen
- Camera: Front wide-angle camera (2): 5 MP, 1080p HD
- Connectivity: Wireless: 802.11 a/b/g/n/ac Wi-Fi; Bluetooth 4.0 Low Energy; NFC reader; Miracast; Ports: 2× full-size USB 3.0; 2 or 4× full-size USB 2.0; Gigabit Ethernet; DisplayPort; 3.5 mm audio socket; RS-232 serial port; RJ11 jack
- Online services: Windows Store; OneDrive; Skype for Business; Groove Music; Xbox Games; Microsoft Movies & TV
- Dimensions: 55-inch model: 59.62 inches (151.4 cm) w; 31.75 inches (80.6 cm) h; 3.38 inches (86 mm) d; 84-inch model: 86.7 inches (220 cm) w; 46.12 inches (117.1 cm) h; 4.15 inches (105 mm) d
- Weight: 55-inch: 48 kilograms (106 lb); 84-inch: 127 kilograms (280 lb)
- Successor: Surface Hub 2S
- Website: www.microsoft.com/microsoft-surface-hub

The Surface Hub is a brand of interactive whiteboard developed and marketed by Microsoft, as part of the Microsoft Surface family. The Surface Hub is a wall-mounted or roller-stand-mounted device with either a 55-inch (140 cm) 1080p or an 84-inch (210 cm) 4K 120 Hz touchscreen with multi-touch and multi-pen capabilities, running the Windows 10 operating system. The devices are targeted for businesses to use while collaborating and videoconferencing.

On May 15, 2018, Microsoft announced that the second-generation Surface Hub 2S would be released in 2019.

== History ==
In 2012, Microsoft acquired Jeff Han's Perceptive Pixel, which had previously developed large-screen multi-touch displays such as the CNN Magic Wall. Microsoft indicated in 2014 that it intended to mass-produce the devices as part of an effort to bring down cost.

Microsoft first announced the Surface Hub at its Windows 10 Devices Event on January 21, 2015, at which the device was in use throughout the majority of the keynote. Microsoft began taking Surface Hub pre-orders on July 1, 2015 for both the 55-inch model and the 84-inch model, stating that they would begin shipping in September 2015. However, on July 13, 2015, it was announced on Microsoft's Surface Blog that pre-order demands had greatly exceeded predictions and that shipments would be delayed, with more details regarding the delays coming in mid-August. It was confirmed that Microsoft had delayed shipment to January 1, 2016. In December 2015, Microsoft announced another delay and that they would be raising the prices by $2,000, though they would honor the price agreements for pre-orders that had been placed. The Surface Hub began shipping to business customers on March 25, 2016.

== Features ==
=== Hardware ===
Both Surface Hub models use the 4th-generation Intel Core Haswell processors (Core i5 for the 55-inch and Core i7 for the 84-inch) and run the 64-bit version of Windows 10. The main differences between the two variants are screen size, resolution and graphics adapters. The 55-inch model supports 1920 × 1080 Full HD and contains an Intel HD Graphics 4600 controller integrated in the CPU, while the more-expensive 84-inch model has 3840 × 2160 4K resolution powered by a Nvidia Quadro K2200 discrete graphics adapter.

The screen of both models has a high-definition display with 120 Hz refresh rate, though it is not intended for use in film or TV screening. The screen is capable of achieving high levels of brightness (up to 424.38 cd/m^{2}), and can reach a minimum of 1.58 cd/m^{2}. The screen has a touch sensor which allows it to detect whether a stylus is being used.

Surface Hub models have a wide-angle HD camera on either side of the device. The cameras produce video at 1080p and 30 fps, and are enabled with a four-element microphone array. The cameras have sensors for ambient light and infrared presence, allowing the hub to react to light levels or heat in the room (e.g.: activating a presentation program when someone enters the room). When used for videoconferencing, the cameras are intended to automatically track a person moving from one side of the display to the other. According to Microsoft, the four-element microphone array can detect a whisper from 23 feet (7.0 m) away, but in PC Magazine's tests of the Hub, a more realistic estimation is about 15 feet (4.6 m).

=== Software ===
The Surface Hub runs Windows 10 Team, a customized version of Windows 10 Enterprise. Users can disable the restrictive access by opening the Settings app and select the option to reinstall Windows 10 Enterprise.

Software product JT2GO (developed by Siemens) allows users of the Surface Hub to interact with a 3D model. The models can be displayed from any angle and be enlarged or reduced in real time. The application can be used on all Windows 10 devices but is particularly useful on the Surface Hub.

Skype for Business video conferencing will be included with the Surface Hub. Microsoft Office applications can also be used, including Word, PowerPoint and Excel. Microsoft OneNote allows users to draw on the screen.

The Hub's welcome screen has three buttons – call, whiteboard and connect – corresponding to the promoted themes of talking, drawing and sharing. These functions can be used individually or simultaneously.

== Manufacture ==
The Surface Hub was originally manufactured at a plant in Wilsonville, Oregon. In July 2017, however, Microsoft announced that it would be moving production to China and closing the plant in the following months, resulting in the loss of jobs for 124 workers.

== Issues ==
The Microsoft Surface Hub Keyboard has insufficient protection against replay attacks, so an attacker could control the Surface Hub remotely under certain scenarios.

== See also ==
- Perceptive Pixel
- Google Jamboard
- Microsoft PixelSense
