= Coffee Lake =

Eighth-generation Intel Core microprocessor family

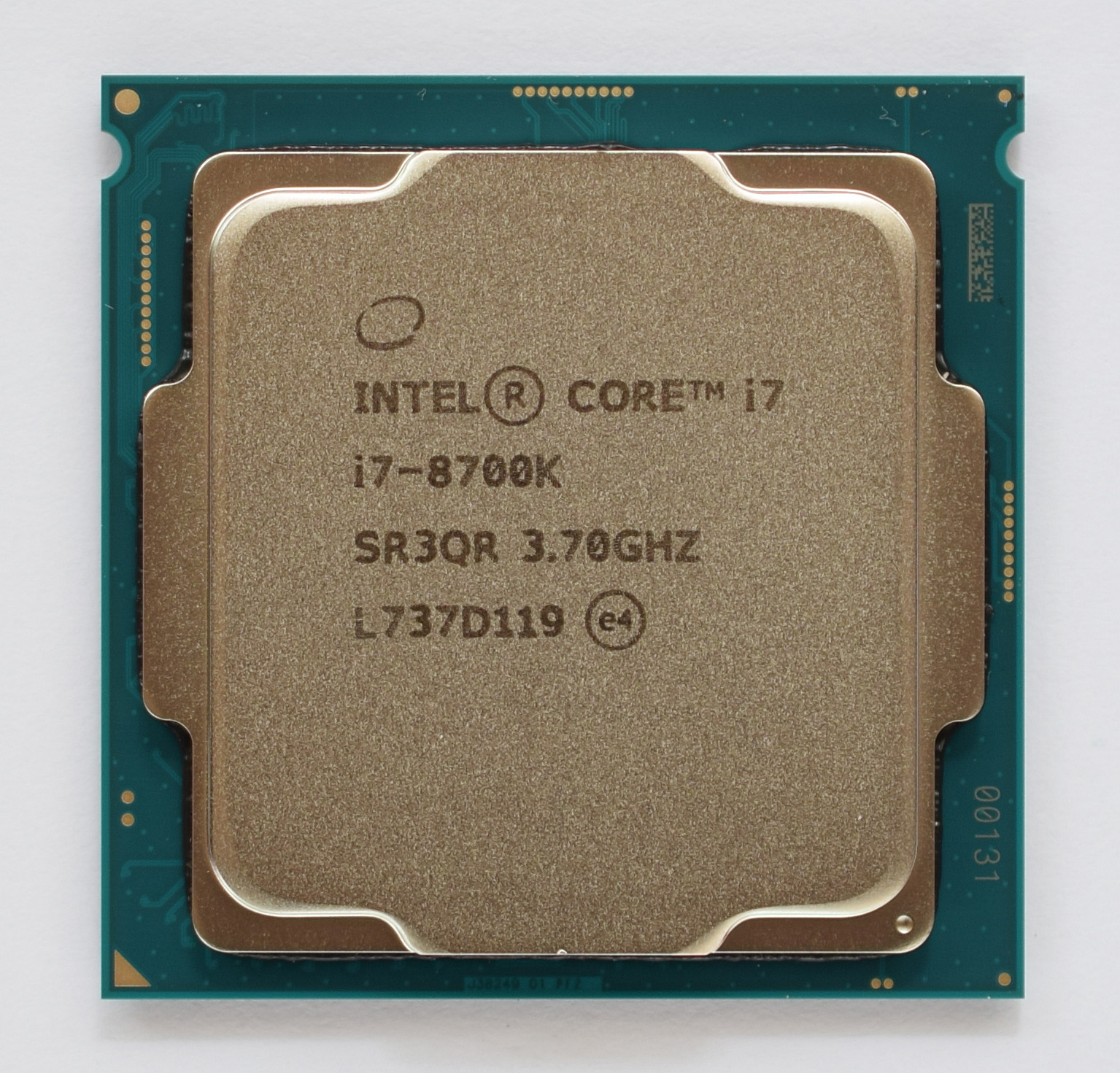
- Intel Core i7-8700K with six physical cores

General information
- Launched: October 5, 2017; 8 years ago
- Discontinued: June 4, 2021 (8th gen, except for Xeons); December 24, 2021 (9th gen)
- Marketed by: Intel
- Designed by: Intel
- Common manufacturer: Intel
- CPUID code: 0906eah, 0906ebh, 0906ech, 0906edh
- Product code: 80684

Physical specifications
- Cores: 2–8
- GPU: GT2, GT3e
- Socket: LGA 1151 with altered pinout to support more than four cores

Cache
- L1 cache: 64 KB (Note: Transistorized memory, such as RAM, ROM, flash and cache sizes as well as file sizes are specified using binary meanings for K (1024^{1}), M (1024^{2}), G (1024^{3}), etc.) per core
- L2 cache: 256 KB per core
- L3 cache: Up to 16 MB, shared
- L4 cache: 128 MB of eDRAM (on some models)

Architecture and classification
- Application: Desktop
- Technology node: Intel 14 nm++
- Microarchitecture: Coffee Lake
- Instruction set: x86-64
- Instructions: x86-64
- Extensions: MMX, AES-NI, CLMUL, FMA3, RDRAND; SSE, SSE2, SSE3, SSSE3, SSE4.1, SSE4.2; AVX, AVX2, TXT, TSX, SGX; VT-x, VT-d

Products, models, variants
- Product code name: CFL
- Brand name: Celeron; Pentium Gold; Core i3; Core i5; Core i7; Core i9; Xeon E

History
- Predecessor: Kaby Lake (optimization)
- Successors: Same generation: Cannon Lake (10nm, mobile); Whiskey Lake (14nm, mobile); Next generation: Ice Lake (10nm, mobile); Comet Lake (14nm, desktop)

Support status
- Legacy support for iGPU

Coffee Lake is Intel's codename for its eighth-generation Core-branded microprocessor family, announced on September 25, 2017. It is manufactured using Intel's second 14 nm process node refinement. Desktop Coffee Lake processors introduced i5 and i7 CPUs featuring six cores (along with hyper-threading in the case of the latter) and Core i3 CPUs with four cores and no hyperthreading.

On October 8, 2018, Intel announced what it branded its ninth generation of Core processors, the Coffee Lake Refresh family. To avoid running into thermal problems at high clock speeds, Intel soldered the integrated heat spreader (IHS) to the CPU die instead of using thermal paste as on the Coffee Lake processors. The generation was defined by another increase of core counts.

Coffee Lake is used with the 300-series chipset, and officially does not work with the 100- and 200-series chipset motherboards. Although desktop Coffee Lake processors use the same physical LGA 1151 socket as Skylake and Kaby Lake, the pinout is electrically incompatible with these older processors and motherboards.

On April 2, 2018, Intel released additional desktop Core i3, i5, i7, Pentium Gold, Celeron CPUs, the first six-core Core i7 and i9 mobile CPUs, hyper-threaded four-core Core i5 mobile CPUs, and the first Coffee Lake ultra low-power CPUs with Intel Iris Plus graphics.

On June 8, 2018, to commemorate the 40th anniversary of the Intel 8086 CPU architecture, Intel released the i7-8086K as a limited edition CPU, a renumbered and slightly higher clocked batch of the i7-8700K dies.

== History ==
Coffee Lake's development was led by Intel Israel's processor design team in Haifa, Israel, as an optimization of Kaby Lake. Intel first launched its 8th Generation Intel Core family processors in August 2017. While with the release of the new 8th Gen Intel Core i9 processor in 2018, Intel said it would be the highest-performance laptop processor Intel has ever built.

== Features ==
Coffee Lake processor die from an i7-8700K with 6 cores

Coffee Lake CPUs are built using the second refinement of Intel's 14 nm process (14 nm++). It features increased transistor gate pitch for a lower current density and higher leakage transistors that allows higher peak power and higher frequency at the expense of die area and idle power.

Coffee Lake marks a shift in the number of cores for Intel's mainstream desktop processors, the first such update for the previous ten-year history of Intel Core CPUs. In the 8th generation, mainstream desktop i7 CPUs feature six hyperthreaded cores, i5 CPUs feature six single-threaded cores and i3 CPUs feature four single-threaded cores.

=== 9th generation ===
For the 9th generation, the Intel Core i9 branding made its debut on the mainstream desktop, describing CPUs with 8 cores and 16 threads. 9th generation i7s feature 8 single-threaded cores, marking the first time desktop Core i7s have not featured Intel's Hyper-threading technology, although the 9th generation Core i7 mobile CPUs do support hyperthreading and have 6 cores just like 8th gen mobile chips. 9th generation i5 CPUs feature six single-threaded cores, just like their 8th generation predecessors.

The ninth generation Core i series includes hardware fixes for Meltdown and L1 Terminal Fault.

== Chipsets ==
The 300 series chipsets, while using physically identical LGA 1151 socket to the 100 and 200 series chipsets, are officially only compatible with Coffee Lake CPUs, meaning that older motherboards do not officially support Coffee Lake processors, and 300 series motherboards do not officially support Skylake or Kaby Lake processors. It is although possible, in some motherboards, to cover some pins on the socket and flash a custom BIOS image which accepts newer processors on older sixth or seventh generation motherboards.

The enthusiast Z370 (a rebranded Z270), launched alongside the first Coffee Lake CPUs in October 2017, was the only officially supported chipset for these mainstream CPUs. When the full lineup of CPUs was revealed in April 2018, it was then accompanied by the lower-end H310, B360, H370 and Q370 chipsets for home and business users. The Z390 chipset was launched alongside the release of the 9th generation CPUs, supporting all 8th and 9th generation mainstream desktop parts. A B365 chipset was added later on.

9th generation Xeons require motherboards with the C246 chipset.

== Architecture changes compared with Kaby Lake ==
Coffee Lake features largely the same CPU core and performance per MHz as Skylake/Kaby Lake. Features specific to Coffee Lake include:

=== CPU ===
- Increased core count: Core i3 increased from 2 to 4 cores, Core i5 and 8th Generation i7 parts increased from 4 to 6 cores, 9th generation i7 and i9 parts feature eight cores.
- Increased L3 cache in accordance to the number of threads
- Increased turbo clock speeds across i5 and i7 CPUs models (increased by up to 400 MHz)
- The 9th generation loses Hyper-threading except on i9.
- DDR4 memory support updated for 2666 MT/s (for i5, i7 and i9 parts) and 2400 MT/s (for i3 parts)
- DDR3 memory is no longer supported on LGA1151 parts, unless using with H310C chipset
- Hardware mitigations against spectre variant 3 and 5 on 9th generation

GPU

- Increased iGPU clock speeds by 50 MHz and rebranded it UHD (Ultra High Definition)

I/O

- 300 series chipset on the second revision of socket LGA 1151
- Support for CNVi

== Kaby Lake Refresh vs. Coffee Lake ==
On August 8, 2017, Intel announced the first of its new eighth generation of processors would be mobile processors. As Intel's previous changes in product generations coincided with new microarchitectures, it was unclear but generally expected that the eighth Core generation products would be based on the new Coffee Lake microarchitecture. When it was officially announced on August 21, 2017, however, Intel stated that the eighth generation family would be based on multiple microarchitectures: Kaby Lake Refresh, Coffee Lake, Whiskey Lake, and Cannon Lake.

== List of 8th generation Coffee Lake processors ==
=== Coffee Lake-S (Desktop processors) ===
These processors mark the first time that Intel has released mainstream consumer CPUs that support up to 128 GB RAM.

Processor branding	Model	Cores (threads)	CPU clock rate (GHz)							GPU		L3 cache	TDP	Memory support	Release date	Price (USD) (Note: Price is Recommended Customer Price (RCP) at launch. RCP is the trade price that processors are sold by Intel to retailers and OEMs. Actual MSRP for consumers is higher.)
Processor branding	Model	Cores (threads)	Base	Turbo clock rate						Model	Max GPU clock rate (GHz)	L3 cache	TDP	Memory support	Release date	Price (USD)
Processor branding	Model	Cores (threads)	Base	Number of cores used						Model	Max GPU clock rate (GHz)	L3 cache	TDP	Memory support	Release date	Price (USD)
Processor branding	Model	Cores (threads)	Base	1	2	3	4	5	6	Model	Max GPU clock rate (GHz)	L3 cache	TDP	Memory support	Release date	Price (USD)
Core i7	8086K	6 (12)	4.0	5.0	4.6	4.5	4.4		4.3	UHD; 630	1.20	12 MB	95 W	Up to 128 GB DDR4-2666	Jun 8, 2018	$425
Core i7	8700K	6 (12)	3.7	4.7	4.6	4.5	4.4		4.3	UHD; 630	1.20	12 MB	95 W	Up to 128 GB DDR4-2666	Oct 5, 2017	$359
Core i7	8700	6 (12)	3.2	4.6	4.5	4.4	4.3			UHD; 630	1.20	12 MB	65 W	Up to 128 GB DDR4-2666	Oct 5, 2017	$303
Core i7	8700T	6 (12)	2.4	4.0	4.0	3.9		3.8		UHD; 630	1.20	12 MB	35 W	Up to 128 GB DDR4-2666	Apr 2, 2018	$303
Core i5	8600K	6 (6)	3.6	4.3	4.2			4.1		UHD; 630	1.15	9 MB	95 W	Up to 128 GB DDR4-2666	Oct 5, 2017	$257
Core i5	8600	6 (6)	3.1	4.3	4.2			4.1		UHD; 630	1.15	9 MB	65 W	Up to 128 GB DDR4-2666	Apr 2, 2018	$213
Core i5	8600T	6 (6)	2.3	3.7	3.6			3.5		UHD; 630	1.15	9 MB	35 W	Up to 128 GB DDR4-2666	Apr 2, 2018	$213
Core i5	8500	6 (6)	3.0	4.1	4.0			3.9		UHD; 630	1.10	9 MB	65 W	Up to 128 GB DDR4-2666	Apr 2, 2018	$192
Core i5	8500T	6 (6)	2.1	3.5	3.4	3.3		3.2		UHD; 630	1.10	9 MB	35 W	Up to 128 GB DDR4-2666	Apr 2, 2018	$192
Core i5	8400	6 (6)	2.8	4.0	3.9			3.8		UHD; 630	1.05	9 MB	65 W	Up to 128 GB DDR4-2666	Oct 5, 2017	$182
Core i5	8400T	6 (6)	1.7	3.3	3.2	3.1		3.0		UHD; 630	1.05	9 MB	35 W	Up to 128 GB DDR4-2666	Apr 2, 2018	$182
Core i3	8350K	4 (4)	4.0	—N/a						UHD; 630	1.15	8 MB	91 W	Up to 64 GB DDR4-2400	Oct 5, 2017	$168
Core i3	8300	4 (4)	3.7	—N/a						UHD; 630	1.15	8 MB	62 W	Up to 64 GB DDR4-2400	Apr 2, 2018	$138
Core i3	8300T	4 (4)	3.2	—N/a						UHD; 630	1.15	8 MB	35 W	Up to 64 GB DDR4-2400	Apr 2, 2018	$138
Core i3	8100	4 (4)	3.6	—N/a						UHD; 630	1.10	6 MB	65 W	Up to 64 GB DDR4-2400	Oct 5, 2017	$117
Core i3	8100F	4 (4)	3.6	—N/a						—N/a		6 MB	65 W	Up to 64 GB DDR4-2400	Jan 7, 2019	?
Core i3	8100T	4 (4)	3.1	—N/a						UHD; 630	1.10	6 MB	35 W	Up to 64 GB DDR4-2400	Apr 2, 2018	$117
Pentium; Gold	G5600	2 (4)	3.9	—N/a						UHD; 630	1.10	4 MB	54 W	Up to 64 GB DDR4-2400	Apr 2, 2018	$86
Pentium; Gold	G5500	2 (4)	3.8	—N/a						UHD; 630	1.10	4 MB	54 W	Up to 64 GB DDR4-2400	Apr 2, 2018	$75
Pentium; Gold	G5500T	2 (4)	3.2	—N/a						UHD; 630	1.10	4 MB	35 W	Up to 64 GB DDR4-2400	Apr 2, 2018	$75
Pentium; Gold	G5400	2 (4)	3.7	—N/a						UHD; 610	1.05	4 MB	54 W	Up to 64 GB DDR4-2400	Apr 2, 2018	$64
Pentium; Gold	G5400T	2 (4)	3.1	—N/a						UHD; 610	1.05	4 MB	35 W	Up to 64 GB DDR4-2400	Apr 2, 2018	$64
Celeron	G4920	2 (2)	3.2	—N/a						UHD; 610	1.05	2 MB	54 W	Up to 64 GB DDR4-2400	Apr 2, 2018	$52
Celeron	G4900	2 (2)	3.1	—N/a						UHD; 610	1.05	2 MB	54 W	Up to 64 GB DDR4-2400	Apr 2, 2018	$42
Celeron	G4900T	2 (2)	2.9	—N/a						UHD; 610	1.05	2 MB	35W	Up to 64 GB DDR4-2400	Apr 2, 2018	$42

* various reviews show that the Core i7-8700K CPU may consume over 110 W under load.

=== Coffee Lake-S WS (server/workstation processors) LGA 1151 ===
Processor branding	Model	Cores (threads)	CPU clock rate (GHz)		GPU		L3 cache	TDP	Memory support	Price (USD)
Processor branding	Model	Cores (threads)	Base	Max. Turbo	Model	max GPU (GHz)	L3 cache	TDP	Memory support	Price (USD)
Xeon E	2186G	6 (12)	3.8	4.7	UHD P630	1.20	12 MB	95 W	DDR4-2666 Up to 128 GB ECC memory supported	$450
Xeon E	2176G	6 (12)	3.7	4.7	UHD P630	1.20	12 MB	80 W	DDR4-2666 Up to 128 GB ECC memory supported	$362
Xeon E	2146G	6 (12)	3.5	4.5	UHD P630	1.15	12 MB	80 W	DDR4-2666 Up to 128 GB ECC memory supported	$311
Xeon E	2136	6 (12)	3.3	4.5	—N/a		12 MB	80 W	DDR4-2666 Up to 128 GB ECC memory supported	$284
Xeon E	2126G	6 (6)	3.3	4.5	UHD P630	1.15	12 MB	80 W	DDR4-2666 Up to 128 GB ECC memory supported	$255
Xeon E	2174G	4 (8)	3.8	4.7	UHD P630	1.20	8 MB	71 W	DDR4-2666 Up to 128 GB ECC memory supported	$328
Xeon E	2144G	4 (8)	3.6	4.5	UHD P630	1.15	8 MB	71 W	DDR4-2666 Up to 128 GB ECC memory supported	$272
Xeon E	2134	4 (8)	3.5	4.5	—N/a		8 MB	71 W	DDR4-2666 Up to 128 GB ECC memory supported	$250
Xeon E	2124G	4 (4)	3.4	4.5	UHD P630	1.15	8 MB	71 W	DDR4-2666 Up to 128 GB ECC memory supported	$213
Xeon E	2124	4 (4)	3.3	4.3	—N/a		8 MB	71 W	DDR4-2666 Up to 128 GB ECC memory supported	$193
Xeon E	2104G	4 (4)	3.2	—N/a	UHD P630	1.10	8 MB	65 W	DDR4-2666 Up to 128 GB ECC memory supported	$193

=== Mobile processors (Coffee Lake H and Coffee Lake U) ===
Processor branding	Model	Cores (threads)	CPU clock rate (GHz)		GPU			L3 cache	L4 cache (eDRAM)	TDP	cTDP	Price (USD)
Processor branding	Model	Cores (threads)	Base	Max. Turbo	Model	clock rate		L3 cache	L4 cache (eDRAM)	TDP	cTDP	Price (USD)
Processor branding	Model	Cores (threads)	Base	Max. Turbo	Model	Base (MHz)	Max. (GHz)	L3 cache	L4 cache (eDRAM)	TDP	Down	Price (USD)
Xeon E	2186M	6 (12)	2.9	4.8	UHD P630	350	1.20	12 MB	—N/a	45 W	35 W	$623
Xeon E	2176M	6 (12)	2.7	4.4	UHD P630	350	1.20	12 MB	—N/a	45 W	35 W	$450
Core i9	8950HK	6 (12)	2.9	4.8	UHD 630	350	1.20	12 MB	—N/a	45 W	—N/a	$583
Core i7	8850H	6 (12)	2.6	4.3	UHD 630	350	1.15	9 MB	—N/a	45 W	35 W	$395
Core i7	8750H	6 (12)	2.2	4.1	UHD 630	350	1.10	9 MB	—N/a	45 W	35 W	$395
Core i7	8700B	6 (12)	3.2	4.6	UHD 630	350	1.20	12 MB	—N/a	65 W	—N/a	$303
Core i7	8569U	4 (8)	2.8	4.7	Iris Plus 655	300	1.20	8 MB	128 MB	28 W	—N/a	$431
Core i7	8559U	4 (8)	2.7	4.5	Iris Plus 655	300	1.20	8 MB	128 MB	28 W	20	$431
Core i7	8557U	4 (8)	1.7	4.5	Iris Plus 645	300	1.15	8 MB	128 MB	15 W	—N/a	OEM
Core i5	8500B	6 (6)	3.0	4.1	UHD 630	350	1.10	9 MB	—N/a	65 W	—N/a	$192
Core i5	8400B	6 (6)	2.8	4.0	UHD 630	350	1.05	9 MB	—N/a	65 W	—N/a	$182
Core i5	8400H	4 (8)	2.5	4.2	UHD 630	350	1.10	8 MB	—N/a	45 W	35 W	$250
Core i5	8300H	4 (8)	2.3	4.0	UHD 630	350	1.0	8 MB	—N/a	45 W	35 W	$250
Core i5	8279U	4 (8)	2.4	4.1	Iris Plus 655	300	1.15	6 MB	128 MB	28 W	—N/a	$320
Core i5	8269U	4 (8)	2.6	4.2	Iris Plus 655	300	1.10	6 MB	128 MB	28 W	20	$320
Core i5	8259U	4 (8)	2.3	3.8	Iris Plus 655	300	1.05	6 MB	128 MB	28 W	20	$320
Core i5	8260U	4 (8)	1.6	3.9	UHD 620	300	1.10	6 MB	—N/a	15 W	10 W	OEM
Core i5	8257U	4 (8)	1.4	3.9	Iris Plus 645	300	1.05	6 MB	128 MB	15 W	—N/a	OEM
Core i3	8100B	4 (4)	3.6	—N/a	UHD 630	350	1.05	6 MB	—N/a	65 W	—N/a	$133
Core i3	8100H	4 (4)	3.0	—N/a	UHD 630	350	1.00	6 MB	—N/a	45 W	35 W	$225
Core i3	8109U	2 (4)	3.0	3.6	Iris Plus 655	300	1.05	4 MB	128 MB	28 W	20 W	$304

== List of 9th generation Coffee Lake processors (Coffee Lake Refresh) ==
Coffee Lake Refresh die from an i9-9900K

The first 9th generation Coffee Lake CPUs were released in the fourth quarter of 2018. They include hardware mitigations against certain Meltdown/Spectre vulnerabilities.

The main differences from the 8th generation (besides increased frequency) are:

- Core i7 parts contain 8/8 cores/threads compared to 6/12 in 8th generation Core i7 parts.
- Core i3 parts are equipped with Turbo Boost technology.

Even though the CPUs with F suffix lack an integrated GPU, Intel set the same price for these CPUs as their featureful counterparts. Intel eventually reduced the official pricing of those CPUs in October 2019.

The Intel Core i9-9900KS CPU, released at the end of October 2019, features a limited one year warranty both for box and tray versions due to "its limited volume".

=== Coffee Lake-S (desktop processors) ===
Processor branding	Model	Cores (threads)	CPU clock rate (GHz)									GPU		Smart cache	TDP	Memory support	Price (USD)
Processor branding	Model	Cores (threads)	Base	Turbo								Model	max GPU clock rate	Smart cache	TDP	Memory support	Price (USD)
Processor branding	Model	Cores (threads)	Base	Number of cores used								Model	max GPU clock rate	Smart cache	TDP	Memory support	Price (USD)
Processor branding	Model	Cores (threads)	Base	1	2	3	4	5	6	7	8	Model	max GPU clock rate	Smart cache	TDP	Memory support	Price (USD)
Core i9	9900KS	8 (16)	4.0	5.0								UHD 630	1.20	16 MB	127 W	DDR4-2666 2-channel up to 128 GB	$513
Core i9	9900K	8 (16)	3.6	5.0		4.9	4.8		4.7			UHD 630	1.20	16 MB	95 W	DDR4-2666 2-channel up to 128 GB	$488
Core i9	9900KF	8 (16)	3.6	5.0		4.9	4.8		4.7			—N/a		16 MB	95 W	DDR4-2666 2-channel up to 128 GB	$488
Core i9	9900	8 (16)	3.1	5.0		4.9	4.8		4.7		4.6	UHD 630	1.20	16 MB	65 W	DDR4-2666 2-channel up to 128 GB	$423
Core i9	9900T	8 (16)	2.1	4.4	4.3	4.2	4.1	4.0	3.9	3.8	3.6	UHD 630	1.20	16 MB	35 W	DDR4-2666 2-channel up to 128 GB	$423
Core i7	9700K	8 (8)	3.6	4.9	4.8	4.7		4.6				UHD 630	1.20	12 MB	95 W	DDR4-2666 2-channel up to 128 GB	$374
Core i7	9700KF	8 (8)	3.6	4.9	4.8	4.7		4.6				—N/a		12 MB	95 W	DDR4-2666 2-channel up to 128 GB	$374
Core i7	9700	8 (8)	3.0	4.7	4.7	4.6		4.5				UHD 630	1.20	12 MB	65 W	DDR4-2666 2-channel up to 128 GB	$323
Core i7	9700F	8 (8)	3.0	4.7	4.7	4.6		4.5				—N/a		12 MB	65 W	DDR4-2666 2-channel up to 128 GB	$323
Core i7	9700T	8 (8)	2.0	4.3								UHD 630	1.20	12 MB	35 W	DDR4-2666 2-channel up to 128 GB	$323
Core i5	9600K	6 (6)	3.7	4.6	4.5	4.4		4.3		—N/a		UHD 630	1.15	9 MB	95 W	DDR4-2666 2-channel up to 128 GB	$262
Core i5	9600KF	6 (6)	3.7	4.6	4.5	4.4		4.3		—N/a		—N/a		9 MB	95 W	DDR4-2666 2-channel up to 128 GB	$262
Core i5	9600	6 (6)	3.1	4.6						—N/a		UHD 630	1.15	9 MB	65 W	DDR4-2666 2-channel up to 128 GB	$213
Core i5	9600T	6 (6)	2.3	3.9						—N/a		UHD 630	1.15	9 MB	35 W	DDR4-2666 2-channel up to 128 GB	$213
Core i5	9500	6 (6)	3.0	4.4	4.3	4.2		4.1		—N/a		UHD 630	1.10	9 MB	65 W	DDR4-2666 2-channel up to 128 GB	$192
Core i5	9500F	6 (6)	3.0	4.4	4.3	4.2		4.1		—N/a		—N/a		9 MB	65 W	DDR4-2666 2-channel up to 128 GB	$192
Core i5	9500T	6 (6)	2.2	3.7						—N/a		UHD 630	1.10	9 MB	35 W	DDR4-2666 2-channel up to 128 GB	$192
Core i5	9400	6 (6)	2.9	4.1	4.0			3.9		—N/a		UHD 630	1.05	9 MB	65 W	DDR4-2666 2-channel up to 128 GB	$182
Core i5	9400F	6 (6)	2.9	4.1	4.0			3.9		—N/a		—N/a		9 MB	65 W	DDR4-2666 2-channel up to 128 GB	$182
Core i5	9400T	6 (6)	1.8	3.4						—N/a		UHD 630	1.05	9 MB	35 W	DDR4-2666 2-channel up to 128 GB	$182
Core i3	9350KF	4 (4)	4.0	4.6				—N/a				—N/a		8 MB	91 W	DDR4-2400 2-channel up to 64 GB	$173
Core i3	9350K	4 (4)	4.0	4.6				—N/a				UHD 630	1.15	8 MB	91 W	DDR4-2400 2-channel up to 64 GB	$173
Core i3	9320	4 (4)	3.7	4.4				—N/a				UHD 630	1.15	8 MB	62 W	DDR4-2400 2-channel up to 64 GB	$154
Core i3	9300	4 (4)	3.7	4.3	4.2		4.1	—N/a				UHD 630	1.15	8 MB	62 W	DDR4-2400 2-channel up to 64 GB	$143
Core i3	9300T	4 (4)	3.2	3.8				—N/a				UHD 630	1.10	8 MB	35 W	DDR4-2400 2-channel up to 64 GB	
Core i3	9100	4 (4)	3.6	4.2	4.1	4.0		—N/a				UHD 630	1.10	6 MB	65 W	DDR4-2400 2-channel up to 64 GB	$122
Core i3	9100F	4 (4)	3.6	4.2	4.1	4.0		—N/a				—N/a		6 MB	65 W	DDR4-2400 2-channel up to 64 GB	$122
Core i3	9100T	4 (4)	3.1	3.7		3.4		—N/a				UHD 630	1.10	6 MB	35 W	DDR4-2400 2-channel up to 64 GB	$122
Pentium; Gold	G5620	2 (4)	4.0	—N/a								UHD 630	1.10	4 MB	54 W	DDR4-2400 2-channel up to 64 GB	$86
Pentium; Gold	G5600T	2 (4)	3.3	—N/a								UHD 630	1.05	4 MB	35 W	DDR4-2400 2-channel up to 64 GB	$75
Pentium; Gold	G5420	2 (4)	3.8	—N/a								UHD 610	1.05	4 MB	54 W	DDR4-2400 2-channel up to 64 GB	$64
Pentium; Gold	G5420T	2 (4)	3.2	—N/a								UHD 610	1.05	4 MB	35 W	DDR4-2400 2-channel up to 64 GB	$64
Celeron	G4950	2 (2)	3.3	—N/a								UHD 610	1.05	2 MB	54 W	DDR4-2400 2-channel up to 64 GB	$52
Celeron	G4930	2 (2)	3.2	—N/a								UHD 610	1.05	2 MB	54 W	DDR4-2400 2-channel up to 64 GB	$42
Celeron	G4930T	2 (2)	3.0	—N/a								UHD 610	1.00	2 MB	35 W	DDR4-2400 2-channel up to 64 GB	$42

=== Server/workstation processors ===
Coffee Lake-E CPUs require C242 or C246 chipset.

Processor branding	Model	Cores (threads)	CPU clock rate (GHz)									GPU	Smart cache	TDP	Memory support	Price (USD)
Processor branding	Model	Cores (threads)	Base	Turbo								GPU	Smart cache	TDP	Memory support	Price (USD)
Processor branding	Model	Cores (threads)	Base	Number of cores used								GPU	Smart cache	TDP	Memory support	Price (USD)
Processor branding	Model	Cores (threads)	Base	1	2	3	4	5	6	7	8	GPU	Smart cache	TDP	Memory support	Price (USD)
Xeon E	2288G	8 (16)	3.7	5.0	4.9		4.8		4.7			UHD P630	16 MB	95 W	DDR4-2666 2-channel up to 128 GB with ECC	$539
Xeon E	2278G	8 (16)	3.4	5.0	4.9		4.8		4.7	4.6		UHD P630	16 MB	80 W	DDR4-2666 2-channel up to 128 GB with ECC	$494
Xeon E	2286G	6 (12)	4.0	4.9	4.8		4.7		4.6	—N/a		UHD P630	12 MB	95 W	DDR4-2666 2-channel up to 128 GB with ECC	$450
Xeon E	2276G	6 (12)	3.8	4.9	4.8		4.7		4.6	—N/a		UHD P630	12 MB	80 W	DDR4-2666 2-channel up to 128 GB with ECC	$362
Xeon E	2246G	6 (12)	3.6	4.8	4.7		4.6		4.5	—N/a		UHD P630	12 MB	80 W	DDR4-2666 2-channel up to 128 GB with ECC	$311
Xeon E	2236	6 (12)	3.4	4.8	4.7		4.6		4.5	—N/a		—N/a	12 MB	80 W	DDR4-2666 2-channel up to 128 GB with ECC	$284
Xeon E	2226G	6 (6)	3.4	4.7	4.6		4.5		4.4	—N/a		UHD P630	12 MB	80 W	DDR4-2666 2-channel up to 128 GB with ECC	$255
Xeon E	2274G	4 (8)	4.0	4.9	4.8	4.6	4.4	—N/a				UHD P630	8 MB	83 W	DDR4-2666 2-channel up to 128 GB with ECC	$328
Xeon E	2244G	4 (8)	3.8	4.8	4.7	4.6	4.5	—N/a				UHD P630	8 MB	71 W	DDR4-2666 2-channel up to 128 GB with ECC	$272
Xeon E	2234	4 (8)	3.6	4.8	4.7	4.6	4.5	—N/a				—N/a	8 MB	71 W	DDR4-2666 2-channel up to 128 GB with ECC	$250
Xeon E	2224G	4 (4)	3.5	4.7	4.6	4.5	4.4	—N/a				UHD P630	8 MB	71 W	DDR4-2666 2-channel up to 128 GB with ECC	$213
Xeon E	2224	4 (4)	3.4	4.6	4.5	4.4	4.2	—N/a				—N/a	8 MB	71 W	DDR4-2666 2-channel up to 128 GB with ECC	$193

=== Mobile processors (Xeon E and Coffee Lake-H Refresh) ===
Processor branding	Model	Cores (threads)	CPU clock rate (GHz)									GPU			L3 cache (MB)	TDP (W)	cTDP (W)	Price (US$)
Processor branding	Model	Cores (threads)	Base	Turbo								Model	Clock rate		L3 cache (MB)	TDP (W)	cTDP (W)	Price (US$)
Processor branding	Model	Cores (threads)	Base	Number of cores used								Model	Base (MHz)	Max. (GHz)	L3 cache (MB)	TDP (W)	Down	Price (US$)
Processor branding	Model	Cores (threads)	Base	1	2	3	4	5	6	7	8	Model	Base (MHz)	Max. (GHz)	L3 cache (MB)	TDP (W)	Down	Price (US$)
Xeon E	2286M	8 (16)	2.4	5.0								UHD P630	350	1.25	16	45	35	623
Xeon E	2276M	6 (12)	2.8	4.7						—N/a		UHD P630	350	1.20	12	45	35	450
Core i9	9980HK	8 (16)	2.4	5.00	4.9	4.8	4.7	4.6	4.5	4.4	4.2	UHD 630	350	1.25	16	45	—N/a	583
Core i9	9880H	8 (16)	2.3	4.80								UHD 630	350	1.20	16	45	35	556
Core i7	9850H	6 (12)	2.6	4.60	4.5	4.4	4.3	4.2	4.1	—N/a		UHD 630	350	1.15	12	45	35	395
Core i7	9750H	6 (12)	2.6	4.50	4.40	4.3	4.2	4.1	4.0	—N/a		UHD 630	350	1.15	12	45	35	395
Core i7	9750HF	6 (12)	2.6	4.50						—N/a		—N/a			12	45	35	—N/a
Core i5	9400H	4 (8)	2.5	4.30				—N/a				UHD 630	350	1.10	8	45	35	250
Core i5	9300HF	4 (8)	2.4	4.10				—N/a				—N/a			8	45	35	250
Core i5	9300H	4 (8)	2.4	4.10				—N/a				UHD 630	350	1.05	8	45	35	250

== See also ==
- List of Intel CPU microarchitectures

Atom (ULV)		Node name	Pentium/Core						
Microarch.	Step	Node name	Microarch.	Step					
		600 nm	P6	Pentium Pro (133 MHz)					
		500 nm	P6	Pentium Pro (150 MHz)					
		350 nm	P6	Pentium Pro (166–200 MHz)					
		350 nm	P6	Klamath					
		250 nm	P6	Deschutes					
		250 nm	P6	Katmai	NetBurst				
		180 nm	P6	Coppermine	Willamette				
		130 nm	P6	Tualatin	Northwood				
		130 nm	Pentium M	Banias	Northwood		NetBurst(HT)		NetBurst(×2)
		90 nm	Pentium M	Dothan	Prescott	⇨	Prescott‑2M	⇨	Smithfield
		90 nm	Pentium M	Dothan	~~Tejas~~	→	⇩	→	~~Cedarmill (Tejas)~~
		65 nm	Pentium M	Yonah	~~Nehalem (NetBurst)~~		Cedar Mill	⇨	Presler
		65 nm	Core	Merom	4 cores on mainstream desktop, DDR3 introduced				
Bonnell	Bonnell	45 nm	Core	Penryn					
Bonnell	Bonnell	45 nm	Nehalem	Nehalem	HT reintroduced, integrated MC, PCH; L3-cache introduced, 256 KB L2-cache/core				
Bonnell	Saltwell	32 nm	Nehalem	Westmere	Introduced GPU on same package and AES-NI				
Bonnell	Saltwell	32 nm	Sandy Bridge	Sandy Bridge	On-die ring bus, no more non-UEFI motherboards				
Silvermont	Silvermont	22 nm	Sandy Bridge	Ivy Bridge					
Silvermont	Silvermont	22 nm	Haswell	Haswell	Fully integrated voltage regulator				
Silvermont	Airmont	14 nm	Haswell	Broadwell					
Silvermont	Airmont	14 nm	Skylake	Skylake	DDR4 introduced on mainstream desktop				
Goldmont		14 nm	Skylake	Kaby Lake					
Goldmont		14 nm	Skylake	Coffee Lake	6 cores on mainstream desktop				
Goldmont		14 nm	Skylake	Amber Lake	Mobile-only				
Goldmont Plus		14 nm	Skylake	Whiskey Lake	Mobile-only				
Goldmont Plus		14 nm	Skylake	Coffee Lake Refresh	8 cores on mainstream desktop				
Goldmont Plus		14 nm	Skylake	Comet Lake	10 cores on mainstream desktop				
Goldmont Plus		14 nm	Sunny Cove	Cypress Cove (Rocket Lake)	Backported Sunny Cove microarchitecture for 14 nm				
Tremont		10 nm	Skylake	Palm Cove (Cannon Lake)	Mobile-only				
Tremont		10 nm	Sunny Cove	Sunny Cove (Ice Lake)	512 KB L2-cache/core				
Tremont		10 nm	Sunny Cove	Willow Cove (Tiger Lake)	X^{e} graphics engine				
Gracemont		Intel 7 (10 nm ESF)	Golden Cove	Golden Cove (Alder Lake)	Hybrid, DDR5, PCIe 5.0				
Gracemont		Intel 7 (10 nm ESF)	Golden Cove	Raptor Cove (Raptor Lake)					
Crestmont		Intel 4	Redwood Cove	Meteor Lake	Mobile-only; NPU, chiplet architecture				
Crestmont		Intel 3	Redwood Cove	Arrow Lake-U					
Skymont		TSMC N3B	Lion Cove	Lunar Lake	Low power mobile only (9–30 W)				
Skymont		TSMC N3B	Lion Cove	Arrow Lake					
Darkmont		Intel 18A	Cougar Cove	Panther Lake					
Arctic Wolf		Intel 18A and/or TSMC N2P	Coyote Cove	Nova Lake					
