= Intel Graphics Technology =

Series of integrated graphics processors

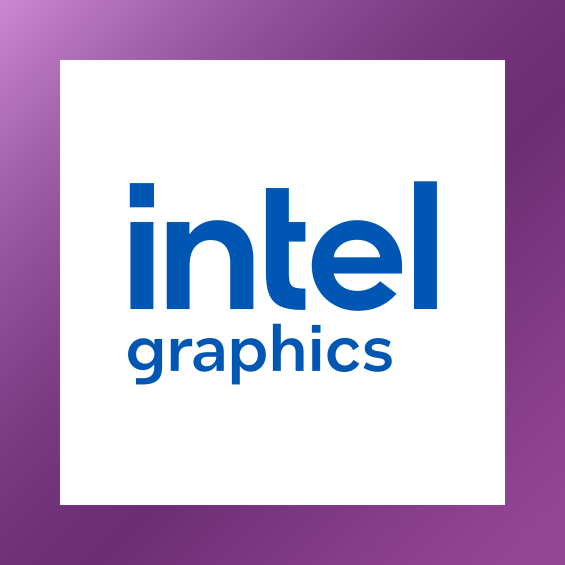
- Release date: 2010
- Manufactured by: Intel and TSMC
- Designed by: Intel

API support
- OpenCL: Varies by GPU and driver; see capabilities
- OpenGL: Varies by GPU and driver; see capabilities
- Vulkan: Varies by GPU and driver; see capabilities

History
- Predecessor: Intel GMA

Intel Graphics Technology (GT) (Note: The abbreviation "GT" appears in certain monitoring tools, such as Intel Power Gadget, in reference to the graphics core on Intel processors.) is a series of integrated graphics processors (IGPs) designed by Intel. The graphics processor is integrated into the processor package, either on the same die as the central processing unit (CPU) or on a separate die or tile. The series was introduced in 2010 as Intel HD Graphics, succeeding Graphics Media Accelerator (GMA). Intel introduced the Intel UHD Graphics name in 2017.

Intel has also used the Iris, Iris Pro, Iris Plus and Iris Xe brands for integrated graphics. Some Iris Pro and Iris Plus models include eDRAM. With Meteor Lake and subsequent Intel Core Ultra processors, integrated GPUs are sold under the Intel Graphics and Intel Arc brands.

Intel Xe architectures are used in both integrated and discrete GPUs. The Intel Arc name therefore does not by itself distinguish a processor's integrated graphics from a separate graphics card. Integrated Arc products include the 130V and 140V in Lunar Lake, the 130T and 140T in Arrow Lake-H, and the B370 and B390 in Panther Lake.

== History ==
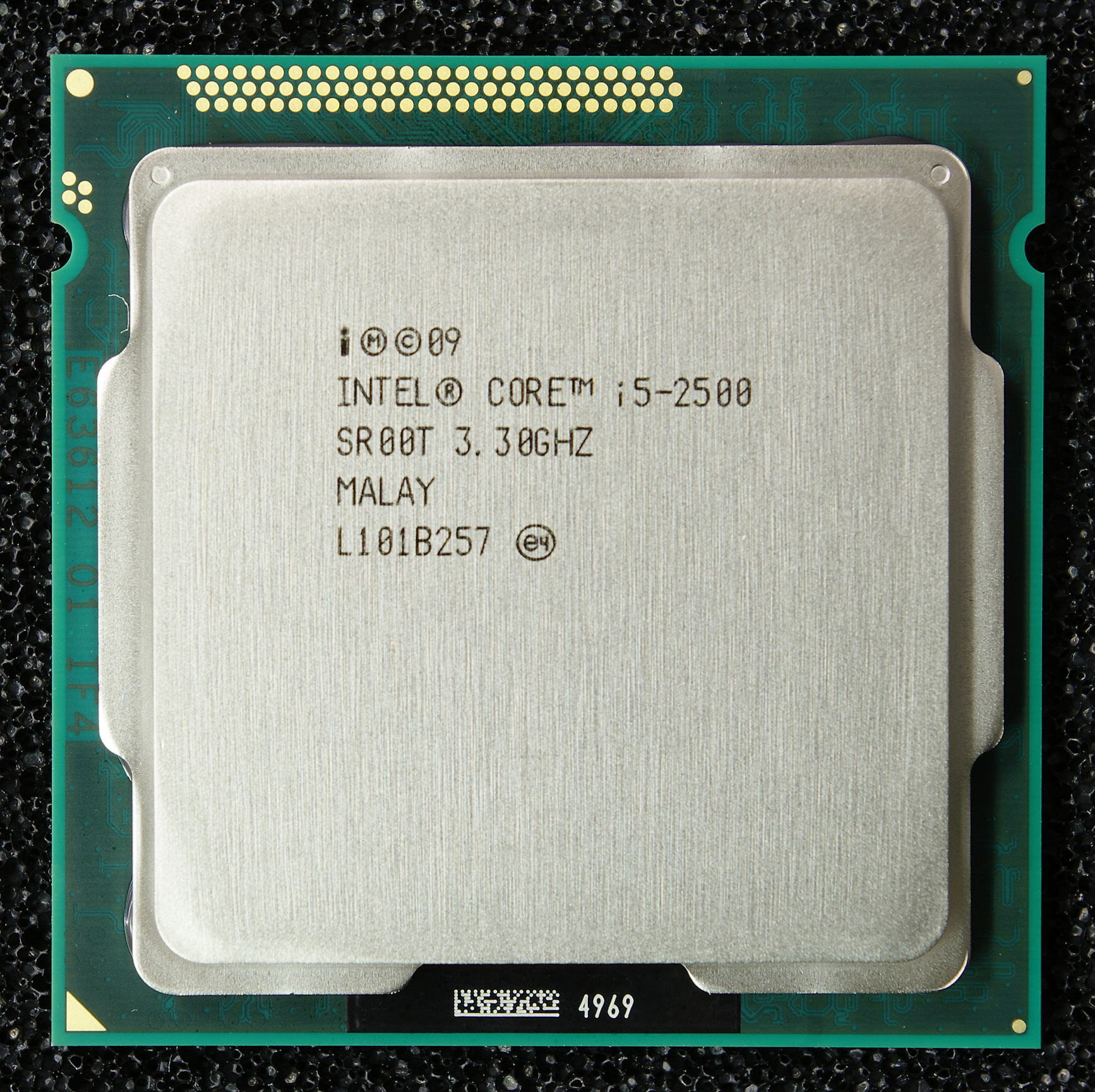
Core i5 processor with integrated HD Graphics 2000

Before the introduction of Intel HD Graphics, Intel integrated graphics were built into the motherboard's northbridge, as part of the Intel's Hub Architecture. They were known as Intel Extreme Graphics and Intel GMA. As part of the Platform Controller Hub (PCH) design, the northbridge was eliminated and graphics processing was moved into the processor package.

The previous Intel integrated graphics solution, Intel GMA, had a reputation of lacking performance and features, and therefore was not considered to be a good choice for more demanding graphics applications, such as 3D gaming. The performance increases brought by Intel's HD Graphics made the products competitive with integrated graphics adapters made by its rivals, Nvidia and ATI/AMD.

== Generations ==
Earlier Intel HD and Iris Graphics are divided into generations and, within a generation, into tiers denoted by the 'GTx' label. Each generation corresponds to the implementation of a Gen graphics microarchitecture with a corresponding GEN instruction set architecture since Gen4.

Later Xe-based products use architecture names such as Xe-LP, Xe-LPG, Xe2 and Xe3. Xe-cores contain vector engines, but the number and capabilities of these engines vary between architectures.

=== Gen5 architecture ===
==== Westmere ====
In January 2010, Clarkdale and Arrandale processors with Ironlake graphics were released, and branded as Celeron, Pentium, or Core with HD Graphics. There was only one specification: 12 execution units, up to 43.2 GFLOPS at 900 MHz. It can decode a H.264 1080p video at up to 40 fps.

Its direct predecessor, the GMA X4500, featured 10 EUs at 800 MHz, but it lacked some capabilities.

Model number	Execution units	Shading units	Base clock (MHz)	Boost clock (MHz)	GFLOPS (FP32)
HD Graphics	12	24	500	900	24.0–43.2

=== Gen6 architecture ===
==== Sandy Bridge ====
In January 2011, the Sandy Bridge processors were released, introducing the "second generation" HD Graphics:

Model number	Tier	Execution units	Boost clock (MHz)	Max GFLOPS		
Model number	Tier	Execution units	Boost clock (MHz)	FP16	FP32	FP64
HD Graphics	GT1	6	1000	192	96	24
HD Graphics 2000	GT1	6	1350	259	129.6	32
HD Graphics 3000	GT2	12	1350	518	259.2	65
HD Graphics P3000	GT2	12	1350	518	259.2	65

Sandy Bridge Celeron and Pentium have Intel HD, while Core i3 and above have either HD 2000 or HD 3000. HD Graphics 2000 and 3000 include hardware video encoding and HD postprocessing effects.

=== Gen7 architecture ===
==== Ivy Bridge ====
On 24 April 2012, Ivy Bridge was released, introducing the "third generation" of Intel's HD graphics:

Model number	Tier	Execution units	Shading units	Boost clock (MHz)	Max GFLOPS (FP32)
HD Graphics [Mobile]	GT1	6	48	1050	100.8
HD Graphics 2500	GT1	6	48	1150	110.4
HD Graphics 4000	GT2	16	128	1300	332.8
HD Graphics P4000	GT2	16	128	1300	332.8

Ivy Bridge Celeron and Pentium have Intel HD, while Core i3 and above have either HD 2500 or HD 4000. HD Graphics 2500 and 4000 include hardware video encoding and HD postprocessing effects.

For some low-power mobile CPUs there is limited video decoding support, while none of the desktop CPUs have this limitation. HD P4000 is featured on the Ivy Bridge E3 Xeon processors with the 12X5 v2 descriptor, and supports unbuffered ECC RAM.

=== Gen7.5 architecture ===
==== Haswell ====
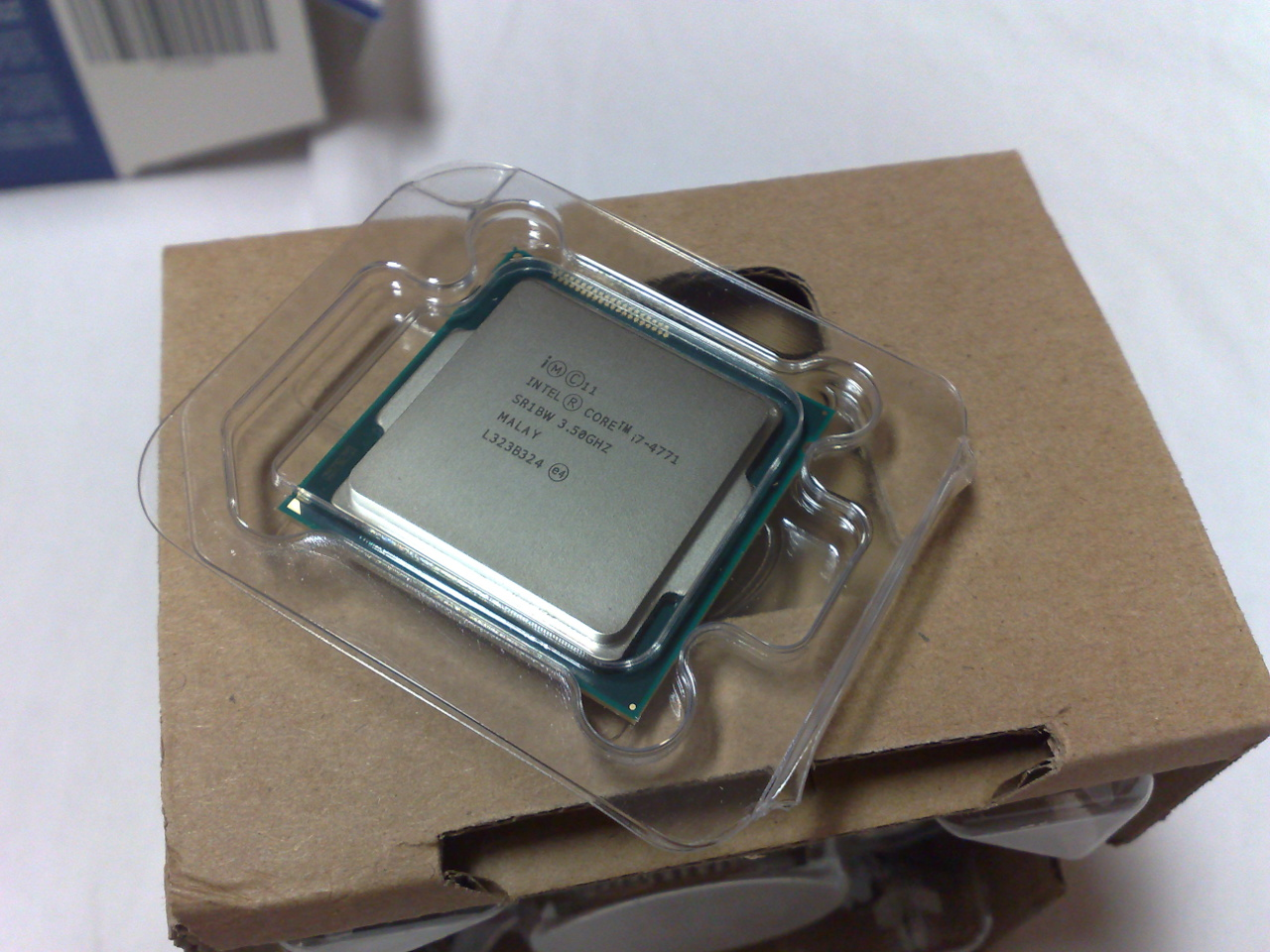
Intel Haswell i7-4771 CPU, which contains integrated HD Graphics 4600 (GT2)

In June 2013, Haswell CPUs were announced, with four tiers of integrated GPUs:

Model number	Tier	Execution units	Shading units	eDRAM (MB)	Boost clock (MHz)	Max GFLOPS		
Model number	Tier	Execution units	Shading units	eDRAM (MB)	Boost clock (MHz)	FP16	FP32	FP64
Consumer
HD Graphics	GT1	10	80	N/A	1150	384	192	48
HD Graphics 4200	GT2	20	160	N/A	850	544	272	68
HD Graphics 4400	GT2	20	160	N/A	950–1150	608-736	304–368	76-92
HD Graphics 4600	GT2	20	160	N/A	900–1350	576-864	288–432	72-108
HD Graphics 5000	GT3	40	320	N/A	1000–1100	1280–1408	640–704	160-176
Iris Graphics 5100	GT3	40	320	N/A	1100–1200	1408–1536	704–768	176-192
Iris Pro Graphics 5200	GT3e	40	320	128	1300	1280–1728	640-864	160-216
Professional
HD Graphics P4600	GT2	20	160	N/A	1200–1250	768-800	384–400	96-100
HD Graphics P4700	GT2	20	160	N/A	1250–1300	800-832	400–416	100-104

The 128 MB of eDRAM in the Iris Pro GT3e is in the same package as the CPU, but on a separate die manufactured in a different process. Intel refers to this as a Level 4 cache, available to both CPU and GPU, naming it Crystalwell. The Linux drm/i915 driver is aware and capable of using this eDRAM since kernel version 3.12.

=== Gen8 architecture ===
==== Broadwell ====
In November 2013, it was announced that Broadwell-K desktop processors (aimed at enthusiasts) would also carry Iris Pro Graphics.

The following models of integrated GPU are announced for Broadwell processors:

Model number	Tier	Execution units	Shading units	eDRAM (MB)	Boost clock (MHz)	Max GFLOPS (FP32)
Consumer
HD Graphics	GT1	12	96	—N/a	850	163.2
HD Graphics 5300	GT2	24	192	—N/a	900	345.6
HD Graphics 5500	GT2	24	192	—N/a	950	364.8
HD Graphics 5600	GT2	24	192	—N/a	1050	403.2
HD Graphics 6000	GT3	48	384	—N/a	1000	768
Iris Graphics 6100	GT3	48	384	—N/a	1100	844.8
Iris Pro Graphics 6200	GT3e	48	384	128	1150	883.2
Professional
HD Graphics P5700	GT2	24	192	–	1000	384
Iris Pro Graphics P6300	GT3e	48	384	128	1150	883.2

==== Braswell ====
Model number	CPU model	Tier	Execution units	Clock speed (MHz)
HD Graphics 400	E8000	GT1	12	320
HD Graphics 400	N30xx	GT1	12	320–600
HD Graphics 400	N31xx	GT1	12	320–640
HD Graphics 400	J3xxx	GT1	12	320–700
HD Graphics 405	N37xx	GT1	16	400–700
HD Graphics 405	J37xx	GT1	18	400–740

=== Gen9 architecture ===
==== Skylake ====
The Skylake line of processors, launched in August 2015, retires VGA support, while supporting multi-monitor setups of up to three monitors connected via HDMI 1.4, DisplayPort 1.2 or Embedded DisplayPort (eDP) 1.3 interfaces.

The following models of integrated GPU are available or announced for the Skylake processors:

Model number	Tier	Execution units	Shading units	eDRAM (MB)	Boost clock (MHz)	Max GFLOPS (FP32)
Consumer
HD Graphics 510	GT1	12	96	—N/a	1050	201.6
HD Graphics 515	GT2	24	192	—N/a	1000	384
HD Graphics 520	GT2	24	192	—N/a	1050	403.2
HD Graphics 530	GT2	24	192	—N/a	1150	441.6
Iris Graphics 540	GT3e	48	384	64	1050	806.4
Iris Graphics 550	GT3e	48	384	64	1100	844.8
Iris Pro Graphics 580	GT4e	72	576	128	1000	1152
Professional
HD Graphics P530	GT2	24	192	–	1150	441.6
Iris Pro Graphics P555	GT3e	48	384	128	1000	768
Iris Pro Graphics P580	GT4e	72	576	128	1000	1152

==== Apollo Lake ====
The Apollo Lake line of processors was launched in August 2016.

Model number	CPU model	Tier	Execution units	Shading units	Clock speed (MHz)
HD Graphics 500	E3930	GT1	12	96	400 – 550
HD Graphics 500	E3940	GT1	12	96	400–600
HD Graphics 500	N3350	GT1	12	96	200–650
HD Graphics 500	N3450	GT1	12	96	200–700
HD Graphics 500	J3355	GT1	12	96	250–700
HD Graphics 500	J3455	GT1	12	96	250–750
HD Graphics 505	E3950	GT1	18	144	500–650
HD Graphics 505	N4200	GT1	18	144	200–750
HD Graphics 505	J4205	GT1	18	144	250–800

=== Gen9.5 architecture ===
==== Kaby Lake ====
The Kaby Lake line of processors was introduced in August 2016. New features: speed increases, support for 4K UHD "premium" (DRM encoded) streaming services, media engine with full hardware acceleration of 8- and 10-bit HEVC and VP9 decode.

Model number	Tier	Execution units	Shading units	eDRAM (MB)	Base clock (MHz)	Boost clock (MHz)	Max GFLOPS (FP32)	Used in
Consumer
HD Graphics 610	GT1	12	96	—N/a	300−350	900−1100	172.8–211.2	Desktop Celeron, Desktop Pentium G4560, i3-7101
HD Graphics 615	GT2	24	192	—N/a	300	900 – 1050	345.6 – 403.2	m3-7Y30/32, i5-7Y54/57, i7-7Y75, Pentium 4415Y
HD Graphics 620	GT2	24	192	—N/a	300	1000–1050	384–403.2	i3-7100U, i5-7200U, i5-7300U, i7-7500U, i7-7600U
HD Graphics 630	GT2	24	192	—N/a	350	1000–1150	384−441.6	Desktop Pentium G46**, i3, i5 and i7, and Laptop H-series i3, i5 and i7
Iris Plus Graphics 640	GT3e	48	384	64	300	950–1050	729.6−806.4	i5-7260U, i5-7360U, i7-7560U, i7-7660U
Iris Plus Graphics 650	GT3e	48	384	64	300	1050–1150	806.4−883.2	i3-7167U, i5-7267U, i5-7287U, i7-7567U
Professional
HD Graphics P630	GT2	24	192	–	350	1000–1150	384−441.6	Xeon E3-**** v6

==== Kaby Lake Refresh / Amber Lake / Coffee Lake / Coffee Lake Refresh / Whiskey Lake / Comet Lake ====
The Kaby Lake Refresh line of processors was introduced in October 2017. New features: HDCP 2.2 support

Model number	Tier	Execution units	Shading units	eDRAM (MB)	Base clock (MHz)	Boost clock (MHz)	Max GFLOPS (FP32)	Used in
Consumer
UHD Graphics 610	GT1	12	96	–	350	1050	201.6	Pentium Gold G54**, Celeron G49** i5-10200H
UHD Graphics 615	GT2	24	192	–	300	900–1050	345.6–403.2	i7-8500Y, i5-8200Y, m3-8100Y
UHD Graphics 617	GT2	24	192	–	300	1050	403.2	i7-8510Y, i5-8310Y, i5-8210Y
UHD Graphics 620	GT2	24	192	–	300	1000–1150	422.4–441.6	i3-8130U, i5-8250U, i5-8350U, i7-8550U, i7-8650U, i3-8145U, i5-8265U, i5-8365U, i7-8565U, i7-8665U i3-10110U, i5-10210U, i5-10310U, i7-10510U i7-10610U i7-10810U
UHD Graphics 630	GT2	23	184	–	350	1100–1150	404.8–423.2	i3-8350K, i3-8100 with stepping B0
UHD Graphics 630	GT2	24	192	–	350	1050–1250	403.2–480	i9, i7, i5, i3, Pentium Gold G56**, G55** i5-10300H, i5-10400H, i5-10500H, i7-10750H, i7-10850H, i7-10870H, i7-10875H, i9-10885H, i9-10980HK
Iris Plus Graphics 645	GT3e	48	384	128	300	1050–1150	806.4-883.2	i7-8557U, i5-8257U
Iris Plus Graphics 655	GT3e	48	384	128	300	1050–1200	806.4–921.6	i7-8559U, i5-8279U, i5-8269U, i5-8259U, i3-8109U
Professional
UHD Graphics P630	GT2	24	192	–	350	1100–1200	422.4–460.8	Xeon E 21**G, 21**M, 22**G, 22**M, Xeon W-108**M

==== Gemini Lake/Gemini Lake Refresh ====
New features: HDMI 2.0 support, VP9 10-bit Profile2 hardware decoder

Model number	Tier	Execution units	Shading units	CPU model	Clock speed (MHz)	GFLOPS (FP32)
UHD Graphics 600	GT1	12	96	N4000	200–650	38.4–124.8
UHD Graphics 600	GT1	12	96	N4100	200–700	38.4–134.4
UHD Graphics 600	GT1	12	96	J4005	250–700	48.0–134.4
UHD Graphics 600	GT1	12	96	J4105	250–750	48.0–144.0
UHD Graphics 600	GT1	12	96	J4125	250–750	48.0–144.0
UHD Graphics 605	GT1.5	18	96	N5000	200–750	57.6–216
UHD Graphics 605	GT1.5	18	96	J5005	250–800	72.0–230.4

=== Gen11 architecture ===
==== Ice Lake ====
New features: 10 nm Gen 11 GPU microarchitecture, two HEVC 10-bit encode pipelines, three 4K display pipelines (or 2× 5K60, 1× 4K120), variable rate shading (VRS), and integer scaling.

While the microarchitecture continues to support double-precision floating-point as previous versions did, the mobile configurations of it do not include the feature and therefore on these it is supported only through emulation.

Name	Tier	Execution units	Shading units	Base clock (MHz)	Boost clock (MHz)	GFLOPS			Used in
Name	Tier	Execution units	Shading units	Base clock (MHz)	Boost clock (MHz)	FP16	FP32	FP64	Used in
Consumer
UHD Graphics	G1	32	256	300	900–1050	921.6–1075.2	460.8–537.6	115.2	Core i3-10**G1, i5-10**G1
Iris Plus Graphics	G4	48	384	300	900–1050	1382.4–1612.8	691.2–806.4	96-202	Core i3-10**G4, i5-10**G4
Iris Plus Graphics	G7	64	512	300	1050–1100	2150.4–2252.8	1075.2–1126.4	128-282	Core i5-10**G7, i7-10**G7

=== Xe-LP architecture (Gen12) ===
Model	Process	Execution units	Shading units	Max boost clock (MHz)	Processing power (GFLOPS)				Notes
Model	Process	Execution units	Shading units	Max boost clock (MHz)	FP16	FP32	FP64	INT8	Notes
Intel UHD Graphics 730	Intel 14++ nm	24	192	1200–1300	922–998	461–499	—N/a	1843–1997	Used in Rocket Lake-S
Intel UHD Graphics 750	Intel 14++ nm	32	256	1200–1300	1228–1332	614–666	—N/a	2457–2662	Used in Rocket Lake-S
Intel UHD Graphics P750	Intel 14++ nm	32	256	1300	1332	666	—N/a	2662	Used in Xeon W-1300 series
Intel UHD Graphics for 11th Gen Intel Processors	Intel 10SF	32	256	1400–1450	1434–1484	717–742	—N/a	2867–2970	Used in Tiger Lake-H
Intel UHD Graphics for 11th Gen Intel Processors G4	Intel 10SF	48	384	1100–1250	1690–1920	845–960	—N/a	3379–3840	Used in Tiger Lake-U/H35
Iris Xe Graphics G7	Intel 10SF	80	640	1100–1300	2816–3328	1408–1664	—N/a	5632–6656	Used in Tiger Lake-U/H35
Iris Xe Graphics G7	Intel 10SF	96	768	1050–1450	3379–4454	1690–2227	—N/a	6758–8909	Used in Tiger Lake-U/H35

These are based on the Intel Xe-LP microarchitecture, the low power variant of the Intel Xe GPU architecture also known as Gen 12. New features include Sampler Feedback, Dual Queue Support, DirectX12 View Instancing Tier2, and AV1 8-bit and 10-bit fixed-function hardware decoding. Support for FP64 was removed.

==== Xe-LP architecture (Gen12.2) ====
Alder Lake supports and enables by default GuC and HuC on some drivers.

Model	Process	Execution units	Shading units	Max boost clock (MHz)	Processing power (GFLOPS)				Notes
Model	Process	Execution units	Shading units	Max boost clock (MHz)	FP16	FP32	FP64	INT8	Notes
Intel UHD Graphics 710	Intel 7 (previously 10ESF)	16	128	1300–1350	666–692	333–346		1331–1382	Used in Alder Lake-S/HX & Raptor Lake-S/HX/S-R/HX-R
Intel UHD Graphics 730	Intel 7 (previously 10ESF)	24	192	1400–1450	1076–1114	538–557		2150–2227	Used in Alder Lake-S/HX & Raptor Lake-S/HX/S-R/HX-R
Intel UHD Graphics 770	Intel 7 (previously 10ESF)	32	256	1450–1550	1484–1588	742–794		2970–3174	Used in Alder Lake-S/HX & Raptor Lake-S/HX/S-R/HX-R
Intel UHD Graphics for 12th Gen Intel Processors Intel UHD Graphics for 13th Gen Intel Processors	Intel 7 (previously 10ESF)	48	384	700–1200	1075–1843	538–922		2151–3686	Used in Alder Lake-H/P/U & Raptor Lake-H/P/U
Intel UHD Graphics for 12th Gen Intel Processors Intel UHD Graphics for 13th Gen Intel Processors Intel Graphics	Intel 7 (previously 10ESF)	64	512	850–1400	1741–2867	870–1434		3482–5734	Used in Alder Lake-H/P/U & Raptor Lake-H/P/U
Iris Xe Graphics Intel Graphics	Intel 7 (previously 10ESF)	80	640	900–1400	2304–3584	1152–1792		4608–7168	Used in Alder Lake-H/P/U & Raptor Lake-H/P/U
Iris Xe Graphics Intel Graphics	Intel 7 (previously 10ESF)	96	768	900–1450	2765–4454	1382–2227		5530–8909	Used in Alder Lake-H/P/U & Raptor Lake-H/P/U

==== Twin Lake ====
The Twin Lake N-series processors, introduced in the first quarter of 2025, use the Intel Graphics brand. Their product specifications list execution units rather than Xe-cores.

Integrated graphics in Twin Lake processors
Processor	Graphics brand	Execution units	Maximum graphics frequency (MHz)	References
Intel Processor N150	Intel Graphics	24	1000	
Intel Processor N250	Intel Graphics	32	1250	
Core 3 N350	Intel Graphics	32	1350	
Core 3 N355	Intel Graphics	32	1350	

=== Xe-LPG architecture ===
==== Meteor Lake ====
Meteor Lake introduced Xe-LPG integrated graphics in Core Ultra Series 1 processors. H-series configurations use Intel Arc graphics, while U-series configurations use the Intel Graphics name. Arc branding on these H-series systems requires at least 16 GB of system memory in a dual-channel configuration and enablement by the computer manufacturer.

Integrated graphics in Meteor Lake mobile processors
Graphics brand	Xe-cores	Maximum graphics frequency (MHz)	Processor models	References
Intel Graphics	3	1800	Core Ultra 5 115U	
Intel Graphics	4	1750–2000	Core Ultra 5 134U, 125U, 135U; Core Ultra 7 164U, 155U, 165U	
Intel Arc graphics	7	2200	Core Ultra 5 125H	
Intel Arc graphics	7 (launch); 8 (ARK) (Note: Intel’s launch presentation lists seven Xe-cores for the Core Ultra 5 135H, whereas its product-specification page lists eight.)	2200	Core Ultra 5 135H	
Intel Arc graphics	8	2250–2350	Core Ultra 7 155H, 165H; Core Ultra 9 185H	

Meteor Lake supports hardware encoding and decoding of AV1, H.264 and HEVC. Its display interfaces include DisplayPort 2.1 and HDMI 2.1 FRL, with support for up to four displays.

==== Arrow Lake-S, Arrow Lake-HX and Core Ultra 200U ====
The desktop and HX versions of Arrow Lake use Intel Graphics rather than the larger Arc-branded graphics configurations of Arrow Lake-H. The Core Ultra 200U mobile processors also use Intel Graphics with Xe-LPG architecture.

Selected Xe-LPG configurations in Core Ultra Series 2 processors
Processor	Graphics brand	Xe-cores	Maximum graphics frequency (MHz)	References
Core Ultra 5 225	Intel Graphics	2	1800	
Core Ultra 5 245HX	Intel Graphics	3	1900	
Core Ultra 7 265U	Intel Graphics	4	2100	
Core Ultra 7 270K Plus	Intel Graphics	4	2000	
Core Ultra 9 290HX Plus	Intel Graphics	4	2000	

The Core Ultra 200HX Plus processors introduced in March 2026 retain Xe-LPG graphics: both the Core Ultra 7 270HX Plus and Core Ultra 9 290HX Plus have four Xe-cores.

=== Xe-LPG+ architecture ===
==== Arrow Lake-H ====
Core Ultra 200H processors use Xe-LPG+ graphics, sold as the Intel Arc 130T and 140T. These differ from the Xe-LPG graphics in the 200U and 200HX series and from the Xe2 graphics in the 200V series.

Integrated Arc graphics in Arrow Lake-H processors
Graphics model	Xe-cores	Maximum graphics frequency (MHz)	Processor models	References
Arc 130T	7	2200	Core Ultra 5 225H	
Arc 140T	8	2250	Core Ultra 5 235H; Core Ultra 7 255H	
Arc 140T	8	2300	Core Ultra 7 265H	
Arc 140T	8	2350	Core Ultra 9 285H	

=== Xe2 architecture ===
==== Lunar Lake ====
Lunar Lake processors, sold as Core Ultra 200V, were introduced in the third quarter of 2024. Their integrated GPUs use Xe2 architecture and are branded Arc 130V or Arc 140V.

Integrated Arc graphics in Lunar Lake processors
Graphics model	Xe-cores	Maximum graphics frequency (MHz)	Processor models	References
Arc 130V	7	1850	Core Ultra 5 226V, 228V, 236V, 238V	
Arc 140V	8	1950	Core Ultra 7 256V, 258V	
Arc 140V	8	2000	Core Ultra 7 266V, 268V	
Arc 140V	8	2050	Core Ultra 9 288V	

Lunar Lake supports hardware AV1 encoding and decoding and hardware decoding of H.266/VVC. It supports up to three displays through interfaces including DisplayPort 2.1 UHBR20, HDMI 2.1 FRL and eDP 1.5.

=== Xe3 architecture ===
==== Panther Lake ====
Panther Lake introduced Xe3 graphics in Core Ultra Series 3 processors. Intel announced the series on 5 January 2026, with the first consumer systems available from 27 January.

The graphics configurations comprise two or four Xe-cores under the Intel Graphics brand, ten Xe-cores as Arc B370, and twelve Xe-cores as Arc B390. Intel’s product guide also lists the Arc Pro B370 and Arc Pro B390 names for selected processor configurations.

Integrated graphics in Panther Lake processors
Graphics model	Xe-cores	Maximum graphics frequency (MHz)	Processor models	References
Intel Graphics	2	2300	Core Ultra 5 322, 332	
Intel Graphics	4	2300	Core Ultra 5 336H	
Intel Graphics	4	2450	Core Ultra 5 325, 335; Core Ultra 7 356H	
Intel Graphics	4	2500	Core Ultra 7 355, 365, 366H; Core Ultra 9 386H	
Arc B370	10	2400	Core Ultra 5 338H	
Arc B390	12	2500	Core Ultra X7 358H, 368H; Core Ultra X9 378H, 388H	

The GPU in the Core Ultra 9 386H is manufactured on Intel 3, while the Arc B390 GPU in the Core Ultra X9 378H and the Arc B370 GPU in the Core Ultra 5 338H use TSMC N3E. These are distinct from the Intel 18A process used for their CPU cores.

The B390 and B370 support hardware ray tracing, DirectX 12 Ultimate, AV1 encoding and decoding, and VVC decoding. Unlike the similarly named discrete Arc B-series graphics cards, these B390 and B370 implementations are integrated GPUs.

==== Arc G3 processors ====
The Arc G3 and Arc G3 Extreme are processors with integrated graphics launched in the second quarter of 2026. The G3 uses an Arc B370 GPU; the G3 Extreme uses an Arc B390 GPU.

Integrated graphics in Arc G3 processors
Processor	Graphics model	Xe-cores	Maximum graphics frequency (MHz)	References
Arc G3	Arc B370	10	2200	
Arc G3 Extreme	Arc B390	12	2300	

Both support up to two displays and LPDDR5X memory at up to 8533 MT/s. Their graphics specifications include AV1 encoding and decoding and VVC decoding.

==== Wildcat Lake ====
Wildcat Lake, sold as Core Series 3 without the Ultra designation, was introduced on 16 April 2026. It uses Xe3 graphics under the Intel Graphics brand.

Integrated graphics in Wildcat Lake processors
Processor	Graphics brand	Xe-cores	Maximum graphics frequency (MHz)	References
Core 7 360	Intel Graphics	2	2600	
Core 7 350	Intel Graphics	2	2600	
Core 5 330	Intel Graphics	2	2500	
Core 5 320	Intel Graphics	2	2500	
Core 5 315	Intel Graphics	2	2300	
Core 3 305	Intel Graphics	1	2300	
Core 3 304	Intel Graphics	1	2300	

Wildcat Lake graphics are manufactured on Intel 18A. The platform supports up to three displays, with DisplayPort HBR3, HDMI 2.0b TMDS and eDP 1.5 interfaces. It supports AV1 encoding and decoding, but not VVC hardware encoding or decoding.

== Related discrete graphics ==
Intel uses the Arc brand for both processor graphics and discrete GPUs. Arc A-series and B-series are discrete graphics families; the B-series cards use Xe2 architecture, codenamed Battlemage. Intel announced the Arc B580 and B570 on 3 December 2024. The B580 became available on 13 December 2024, followed by the B570 on 16 January 2025.

Selected specifications of discrete Arc B-series and Arc Pro B-series GPUs
Model	Xe-cores	Ray-tracing units	XMX engines	Memory (GDDR6)	Memory interface (bits)	Memory bandwidth (GB/s)	PCI Express interface	Total board power (W)	References
Arc B570	18	18	144	10 GB	160	380	4.0 ×8	150	
Arc B580	20	20	160	12 GB	192	456	4.0 ×8	190	
Arc Pro B50	16	16	128	16 GB	128	224	5.0 ×8	70	
Arc Pro B60	20	20	160	24 GB	192	456	5.0 ×8	200	
Arc Pro B65	20	20	160	32 GB	256	608	5.0 ×16	200	
Arc Pro B70	32	32	256	32 GB	256	608	5.0 ×16	230	

Intel lists the Arc Pro B60 and B50 as launched in the second and third quarters of 2025, respectively, and the B65 and B70 in the first quarter of 2026. All six GPUs in the table use TSMC N5. The power figures are Intel’s listed total board power; Intel separately lists a 120–200 W range for the B60 and a 160–290 W range for the B70.

== Features ==
=== Intel Insider ===
Beginning with Sandy Bridge, the graphics processors include a form of digital copy protection and digital rights management (DRM) called Intel Insider, which allows decryption of protected media within the processor. Previously there was a similar technology called Protected Audio Video Path (PAVP).

=== HDCP ===
Intel Graphics Technology supports the HDCP technology, but the actual HDCP support depends on the computer's motherboard.

=== Intel Quick Sync Video ===
Intel Quick Sync Video is Intel's hardware video encoding and decoding technology, which is integrated into some of the Intel CPUs. The name "Quick Sync" refers to the use case of quickly transcoding ("syncing") a video from, for example, a DVD or Blu-ray Disc to a format appropriate to, for example, a smartphone. Quick Sync was introduced with the Gen 6 in Sandy Bridge microprocessors on 9 January 2011.

=== Graphics Virtualization Technology ===
Graphics Virtualization Technology (GVT) was announced 1 January 2014 and introduced at the same time as Intel Iris Pro. Intel integrated GPUs support the following sharing methods:

- Direct passthrough (GVT-d): the GPU is available for a single virtual machine without sharing with other machines
- Paravirtualized API forwarding (GVT-s): the GPU is shared by multiple virtual machines using a virtual graphics driver; few supported graphics APIs (OpenGL, DirectX), no support for GPGPU
- Full GPU virtualization (GVT-g): the GPU is shared by multiple virtual machines (and by the host machine) on a time-sharing basis using a native graphics driver; similar to AMD's MxGPU and Nvidia's vGPU, which are available only on professional line cards (Radeon Pro and Nvidia Quadro)
- Full GPU virtualization in hardware (SR-IOV): The GPU can be partitioned and used/shared by multiple virtual machines and the host with support built-in hardware, unlike GVT-g that does this in software (driver).

Intel identifies Gen9 graphics as the last generation supported by its software-based GVT-g solution. Its documentation distinguishes GVT-g from hardware-based SR-IOV, which is available on specified newer platforms; the presence of one does not imply support for the other.

=== Multiple monitors ===
==== Ivy Bridge ====
HD 2500 and HD 4000 GPUs in Ivy Bridge CPUs are advertised as supporting three active monitors, but this only works if two of the monitors are configured identically, which covers many but not all three-monitor configurations. The reason for this is that the chipsets only include two phase-locked loops (PLLs) for generating the pixel clocks timing the data being transferred to the displays.

Therefore, three simultaneously active monitors can only be achieved when at least two of them share the same pixel clock, such as:

- Using two or three DisplayPort connections, as they require only a single pixel clock for all connections. Passive adapters from DisplayPort to some other connector do not count as a DisplayPort connection, as they rely on the chipset being able to emit a non-DisplayPort signal through the DisplayPort connector. Active adapters that contain additional logic to convert the DisplayPort signal to some other format count as a DisplayPort connection.
- Using two non-DisplayPort connections of the same connection type (for example, two HDMI connections) and the same clock frequency (like when connected to two identical monitors at the same resolution), so that a single unique pixel clock can be shared between both connections.

Another possible three-monitor solution uses the Embedded DisplayPort on a mobile CPU (which does not use a chipset PLL at all) along with any two chipset outputs.

==== Haswell ====
ASRock Z87- and H87-based motherboards support three displays simultaneously. Asus H87-based motherboards are also advertised to support three independent monitors at once.

==== Recent processor graphics ====
The number of supported displays and the available display interfaces vary by processor. The following are processor limits; the connectors and combinations available on a computer depend on its implementation. Maximum resolutions also depend on the selected interface and display configuration.

Display capabilities of selected recent processor-graphics platforms
Platform / example processor	Maximum displays	Display interfaces	References
Meteor Lake / Core Ultra 9 185H	4	eDP 1.4b; DisplayPort 2.1; HDMI 2.1 FRL	
Arrow Lake-H / Core Ultra 9 285H	4	eDP 1.4b; DisplayPort 2.1 UHBR20; HDMI 2.1 FRL	
Lunar Lake / Core Ultra 9 288V	3	eDP 1.5; DisplayPort 2.1 UHBR20; HDMI 2.1 FRL	
Panther Lake / Core Ultra 9 386H; Core Ultra X9 378H; Core Ultra 5 338H	4	eDP 1.5; DisplayPort 2.1 UHBR20; HDMI 2.1 FRL	
Arc G3 / G3 Extreme	2	eDP 1.5; DisplayPort 2.1 UHBR20; HDMI 2.1 FRL	
Wildcat Lake / Core 7 360	3	eDP 1.5; DisplayPort HBR3; HDMI 2.0b TMDS	

== Capabilities (GPU hardware) ==
=== Earlier processor graphics ===
Micro- architecture – Socket	Brand				Graphics		Vulkan		OpenGL		Direct3D		HLSL shader model	OpenCL	
Micro- architecture – Socket	Core	Xeon	Pentium	Celeron	Gen	Graphics brand	Linux	Windows	Linux	Windows	Linux	Windows	HLSL shader model	Linux	Windows
Westmere – 1156	i3/5/7-xxx	—N/a	(G/P)6000 and U5000	P4000 and U3000	5.5th	HD	—N/a		2.1		—N/a	10.1	4.1	—N/a	
Sandy Bridge – 1155	i3/5/7-2000	E3-1200	(B)900, (G)800 and (G)600	(B)800, (B)700, G500 and G400	6th	HD 3000 and 2000	—N/a		3.3	3.1	—N/a	10.1	4.1	—N/a	
Ivy Bridge – 1155	i3/5/7-3000	E3-1200 v2	(G)2000 and A1018	G1600, 1000 and 900	7th	HD 4000 and 2500	1.2 (Note: Partial support)	—N/a	4.2	4.0	—N/a	11.0	5.0	1.2 (Beignet)	1.2
Bay Trail – SoCs	—N/a	—N/a	J2000, N3500 and A1020	J1000 and N2000	7th	HD Graphics (Bay Trail)	1.2	—N/a	4.2	4.0	—N/a	11.0	5.0	1.2 (Beignet)	1.2
Haswell – 1150	i3/5/7-4000	E3-1200 v3	(G)3000	G1800 and 2000	7.5th	HD 5000, 4600, 4400 and 4200; Iris Pro 5200, Iris 5000 and 5100	1.2	—N/a	4.6	4.3	—N/a	12 (fl 11_1)	5.0	1.2 (Beignet)	1.2
Broadwell – 1150	i3/5/7-5000	E3-1200 v4	3800	3700 and 3200	8th	Iris Pro 6200 and P6300, Iris 6100 and HD 6000, P5700, 5600, 5500, 5300 and HD Graphics (Broadwell)	1.3	—N/a	4.6	4.4	11	12 (fl 11_1)	5.0	1.2 (Beignet) / 3.0 (Neo)	2.0
Braswell – SoCs	—N/a	—N/a	N3700	N3000, N3050, N3150	8th	HD Graphics (Braswell), based on Broadwell graphics	1.3	—N/a	4.6	4.4	11	12 (fl 11_1)	5.0	1.2 (Beignet)	2.0
Braswell – SoCs	—N/a	—N/a	(J/N)3710	(J/N)3010, 3060, 3160	8th	(rebranded); HD Graphics 400, 405	1.3	—N/a	4.6	4.4	11	12 (fl 11_1)	5.0	1.2 (Beignet)	2.0
Skylake – 1151	i3/5/7-6000	E3-1200 v5 E3-1500 v5	(G)4000	3900 and 3800	9th	HD 510, 515, 520, 530 and 535; Iris 540 and 550; Iris Pro 580	1.4 Mesa 25.0	1.3	4.6	4.6	11	12 (fl 12_1)	6.0	2.0 (Beignet) / 3.0 (Neo)	2.0
Apollo Lake – SoCs	—N/a	—N/a	(J/N)4xxx	(J/N)3xxx	9th	HD Graphics 500, 505	1.4 Mesa 25.0	1.3	4.6	4.6	11	12 (fl 12_1)	6.0	2.0 (Beignet) / 3.0 (Neo)	2.0
Gemini Lake – SoCs	—N/a	—N/a	Silver (J/N)5xxx	(J/N)4xxx	9.5th	UHD 600, 605	1.4 Mesa 25.0	1.3	4.6	4.6	11	12 (fl 12_1)	6.0	2.0 (Beignet) / 3.0 (Neo)	2.0
Kaby Lake – 1151	m3/i3/5/7-7000	E3-1200 v6 E3-1500 v6	(G)4000	(G)3900 and 3800	9.5th	HD 610, 615, 620, 630, Iris Plus 640, Iris Plus 650	1.4 Mesa 25.0	1.3	4.6	4.6	11	12 (fl 12_1)	6.0	2.0 (Beignet) / 3.0 (Neo)	2.1
Kaby Lake Refresh – 1151	i5/7-8000U	—N/a	—N/a	—N/a	9.5th	UHD 620	1.4 Mesa 25.0	1.3	4.6	4.6	11	12 (fl 12_1)	6.0	2.0 (Beignet) / 3.0 (Neo)	2.1
Whiskey Lake – 1151	i3/5/7-8000U	—N/a	—N/a	—N/a	9.5th	UHD 620	1.4 Mesa 25.0	1.3	4.6	4.6	11	12 (fl 12_1)	6.0	2.0 (Beignet) / 3.0 (Neo)	2.1
Coffee Lake – 1151	i3/5/7/9-8000 i3/5/7/9-9000	E-2100; E-2200	Gold (G)5xxx	(G)49xx	9.5th	UHD 630, Iris Plus 655	1.4 Mesa 25.0	1.3	4.6	4.6	11	12 (fl 12_1)	6.0	2.0 (Beignet) / 3.0 (Neo)	2.1
Ice Lake – 1526	i3/5/7-10xx(N)Gx	—N/a	—N/a	—N/a	11th	UHD, Iris Plus	1.4 Mesa 25.0	1.3	4.6	4.6	11	12 (fl 12_1)	6.0	3.0 (Neo)	
Tiger Lake	i3/5/7-11xx(N)Gx	W-11xxxM	Gold (G)7xxx	(G)6xxx	12th	Iris Xe, UHD	1.4 Mesa 25.0	1.4	4.6	4.6	11	12 (fl 12_1)	6.0	3.0 (Neo)	3.0 (Neo)

=== Recent processor graphics and driver support ===
API support depends on the GPU, operating system and driver. Intel’s Windows graphics driver 32.0.101.9030, released on 17 September 2026, lists DirectX 12, Vulkan 1.4, OpenGL 4.6 and OpenCL 3.0. Its supported-platform list includes Meteor Lake, Lunar Lake, Arrow Lake, Panther Lake and Wildcat Lake, as well as Arc A-series, Arc B-series and the listed Arc Pro B-series cards. The release is non-WHQL.

Support for DirectX 12 does not guarantee support for every optional feature or feature level. Intel, via their release notes, requires applications to query optional feature support.

DirectX designations in selected recent Intel product specifications
Platform / graphics	Intel’s listed DirectX support	References
Meteor Lake / Arc graphics	12.2	
Arrow Lake-H / Arc 130T and 140T	12.2	
Lunar Lake / Arc 130V and 140V	12.2	
Arrow Lake-S and HX / Intel Graphics (selected models)	12	
Panther Lake / Intel Graphics, Arc B370 and B390 (selected models)	DirectX 12 Ultimate	
Wildcat Lake / Intel Graphics	12	

The numerical entries above reproduce Intel’s product-specification labels; they are not declarations of a separate DirectX 12.2 runtime. Product pages may also retain API values different from those in later driver releases. For example, Intel lists OpenGL 4.5 for the Core Ultra 7 270K Plus, while the cited Windows driver release lists OpenGL 4.6.

=== Linux graphics and compute drivers ===
Support in Mesa is provided by two Gallium3D-style drivers, with the Iris driver supporting Broadwell hardware and later, while the Crocus driver supports Haswell and earlier. The classic Mesa i965 driver was removed in Mesa 22.0, although it would continue to see further maintenance as part of the Amber branch.

Intel’s open-source Graphics Compute Runtime, also called NEO, implements OpenCL and oneAPI Level Zero. Its supported-platform table lists OpenCL 3.0 for the Xe-based platforms from Tiger Lake through Panther Lake and Wildcat Lake. Gen8, Gen9 and Gen11 support is distributed separately in packages with the legacy1 suffix. The legacy table does not list Level Zero support for every OpenCL-capable platform.

Mesa also provides Rusticl, an OpenCL implementation over Gallium drivers. Device exposure and default enablement depend on the Mesa build, driver and runtime configuration.

== Capabilities (GPU video acceleration) ==
Intel developed a dedicated SIP core which implements multiple video decompression and compression algorithms branded Intel Quick Sync Video. Some are implemented completely, some only partially.

=== Hardware-accelerated algorithms ===
Hardware-accelerated video compression and decompression algorithms present in Intel Quick Sync Video
CPU's microarchitecture	Steps		Video compression and decompression algorithms							
CPU's microarchitecture	Steps		H.265 (HEVC)	H.264 (MPEG-4 AVC)	H.262 (MPEG-2)	VC-1/WMV9	JPEG / MJPEG	VP8	VP9	AV1
Westmere	Decode		✘	✓	✓	✓	✘	✘	✘	✘
Westmere	Encode		✘	✘	✘	✘	✘	✘	✘	✘
Sandy Bridge	Decode	Profiles	✘	ConstrainedBaseline, Main, High, StereoHigh	Simple, Main	Simple, Main, Advanced	✘	✘	✘	✘
Sandy Bridge	Decode	Levels	✘				✘	✘	✘	✘
Sandy Bridge	Decode	Max. resolution	✘	2048x2048			✘	✘	✘	✘
Sandy Bridge	Encode	Profiles	✘	ConstrainedBaseline, Main, High	✘	✘	✘	✘	✘	✘
Sandy Bridge	Encode	Levels	✘		✘	✘	✘	✘	✘	✘
Sandy Bridge	Encode	Max. resolution	✘		✘	✘	✘	✘	✘	✘
Ivy Bridge	Decode	Profiles	✘	ConstrainedBaseline, Main, High, StereoHigh	Simple, Main	Simple, Main, Advanced	Baseline	✘	✘	✘
Ivy Bridge	Decode	Levels	✘					✘	✘	✘
Ivy Bridge	Decode	Max. resolution	✘					✘	✘	✘
Ivy Bridge	Encode	Profiles	✘	ConstrainedBaseline, Main, High	Simple, Main	✘	✘	✘	✘	✘
Ivy Bridge	Encode	Levels	✘			✘	✘	✘	✘	✘
Ivy Bridge	Encode	Max. resolution	✘			✘	✘	✘	✘	✘
Haswell	Decode	Profiles	Partial 8-bit	Main, High, SHP, MHP	Main	Simple, Main, Advanced	Baseline	✘	✘	✘
Haswell	Decode	Levels	Partial 8-bit	4.1	Main, High	High, 3		✘	✘	✘
Haswell	Decode	Max. resolution	Partial 8-bit	1080/60p	1080/60p		16k×16k	✘	✘	✘
Haswell	Encode	Profiles	✘	Main, High	Main	✘	Baseline	✘	✘	✘
Haswell	Encode	Levels	✘	4.1	High	✘	-	✘	✘	✘
Haswell	Encode	Max. resolution	✘	1080/60p	1080/60p	✘	16k×16k	✘	✘	✘
Broadwell	Decode	Profiles	Partial 8-bit & 10-bit		Main	Simple, Main, Advanced		0	Partial	✘
Broadwell	Decode	Levels	Partial 8-bit & 10-bit		Main, High	High, 3		Unified	Partial	✘
Broadwell	Decode	Max. resolution	Partial 8-bit & 10-bit		1080/60p			1080p	Partial	✘
Broadwell	Encode	Profiles	✘	Main	-	✘		✘	✘	✘
Broadwell	Encode	Levels	✘		Main, High	✘		✘	✘	✘
Broadwell	Encode	Max. resolution	✘		1080/60p	✘		✘	✘	✘
Skylake	Decode	Profiles	Main	Main, High, SHP, MHP	Main	Simple, Main, Advanced	Baseline	0	0	✘
Skylake	Decode	Levels	5.2	5.2	Main, High	High, 3	Unified	Unified	Unified	✘
Skylake	Decode	Max. resolution	2160/60p	2160/60p	1080/60p	3840×3840	16k×16k	1080p	4k/24p@15Mbit/s	✘
Skylake	Encode	Profiles	Main	Main, High	Main	✘	Baseline	Unified	✘	✘
Skylake	Encode	Levels	5.2	5.2	High	✘	-	Unified	✘	✘
Skylake	Encode	Max. resolution	2160/60p	2160/60p	1080/60p	✘	16k×16k	-	✘	✘
Kaby Lake; Coffee Lake; Coffee Lake Refresh; Whiskey Lake; Ice Lake; Comet Lake	Decode	Profiles	Main, Main 10	Main, High, MVC, Stereo	Main	Simple, Main, Advanced	Baseline	0	0, 1, 2	✘
Kaby Lake; Coffee Lake; Coffee Lake Refresh; Whiskey Lake; Ice Lake; Comet Lake	Decode	Levels	5.2	5.2	Main, High	Simple, High, 3	Unified	Unified	Unified	✘
Kaby Lake; Coffee Lake; Coffee Lake Refresh; Whiskey Lake; Ice Lake; Comet Lake	Decode	Max. resolution		2160/60p	1080/60p	3840×3840	16k×16k	1080p		✘
Kaby Lake; Coffee Lake; Coffee Lake Refresh; Whiskey Lake; Ice Lake; Comet Lake	Encode	Profiles	Main	Main, High	Main	✘	Baseline	Unified	Support 8 bits 4:2:0; BT.2020 may be obtained the pre/post processing	✘
Kaby Lake; Coffee Lake; Coffee Lake Refresh; Whiskey Lake; Ice Lake; Comet Lake	Encode	Levels	5.2	5.2	High	✘	-	Unified	Support 8 bits 4:2:0; BT.2020 may be obtained the pre/post processing	✘
Kaby Lake; Coffee Lake; Coffee Lake Refresh; Whiskey Lake; Ice Lake; Comet Lake	Encode	Max. resolution	2160/60p	2160/60p	1080/60p	✘	16k×16k	-	Support 8 bits 4:2:0; BT.2020 may be obtained the pre/post processing	✘
Tiger Lake; Rocket Lake	Decode	Profiles	up to Main 4:4:4 12	Main, High	Main	Simple, Main, Advanced	Baseline	✘	0, 1, 2, partially 3	0
Tiger Lake; Rocket Lake	Decode	Levels	6.2	5.2	Main, High	Simple, High, 3	Unified	✘	Unified	3
Tiger Lake; Rocket Lake	Decode	Max. resolution	4320/60p	2160/60p	1080/60p	3840×3840	16k×16k	✘	4320/60p	4K×2K; 16K×16K (still picture)
Tiger Lake; Rocket Lake	Encode	Profiles	up to Main 4:4:4 10	Main, High	Main	✘	Baseline	✘	0, 1, 2, 3	✘
Tiger Lake; Rocket Lake	Encode	Levels	5.1	5.1	High	✘	-	✘	-	✘
Tiger Lake; Rocket Lake	Encode	Max. resolution	4320p	2160/60p	1080/60p	✘	16k×16k	✘	4320p	✘
Alder Lake; Raptor Lake	Decode	Profiles	up to Main 4:4:4 12	Main, High	Main	Simple, Main, Advanced	Baseline	✘	0, 1, 2, 3	0
Alder Lake; Raptor Lake	Decode	Levels	6.1	5.2	Main, High	Simple, High, 3	Unified	✘	6.1	6.1
Alder Lake; Raptor Lake	Decode	Max. resolution	4320/60p	2160/60p	1080/60p	3840×3840	16k×16k	✘	4320/60p	4320/60p 16K×16K (still picture)
Alder Lake; Raptor Lake	Encode	Profiles	up to Main 4:4:4 10	Main, High	Main	✘	Baseline	✘	0, 1, 2, 3	✘
Alder Lake; Raptor Lake	Encode	Levels	5.1	5.1	High	✘	-	✘	-	✘
Alder Lake; Raptor Lake	Encode	Max. resolution	4320p	2160/60p	1080/60p	✘	16k×16k	✘	4320p	✘
Meteor Lake Arrow Lake	Decode	Profiles	up to Main 4:4:4 12	Main, High, Constrained Baseline	Main		Baseline		0, 1, 2, 3	Main 4:2:0 8/10
Meteor Lake Arrow Lake	Decode	Levels	6.1	5.2	Main, High		Unified		Unified	6.1
Meteor Lake Arrow Lake	Decode	Max. resolution	4320/60p	2160p	1080p		16k×16k		4320p/60p 16K x 4K	4320/60p 16K×16K (still picture)
Meteor Lake Arrow Lake	Encode	Profiles	up to Main 4:4:4 10	Main, High, Constrained Baseline			Baseline		0, 1, 2, 3	Main 4:2:0 8/10
Meteor Lake Arrow Lake	Encode	Levels	6.1	5.2			-		-	6
Meteor Lake Arrow Lake	Encode	Max. resolution	4320p/60p	2160/60p			16k×16k		4320p/60p 16K x 12K	4320p/30p

=== Recent graphics platforms ===
The following table summarizes Intel’s documented hardware codec support. It does not imply support for every profile, bit depth, chroma format or resolution. Entries for Arc G3 and Wildcat Lake follow Intel’s processor specifications; the other entries follow the full-feature build of Intel’s Linux media driver. Driver builds and operating-system interfaces can expose different subsets of these capabilities.

Selected hardware video-codec capabilities
Platform	H.264	HEVC	AV1	VP9	VVC	References
Meteor Lake; Arrow Lake-S/H	Encode and decode	Encode and decode	Encode and decode	Encode and decode	Not listed	
Lunar Lake	Encode and decode	Encode and decode	Encode and decode	Decode	Decode	
Discrete Arc Battlemage (B-series)	Encode and decode	Encode and decode	Encode and decode	Decode	Not listed	
Panther Lake	Encode and decode	Encode and decode	Encode and decode	Encode and decode	Decode	
Arc G3 / G3 Extreme	Encode and decode	Encode and decode	Encode and decode	Not specified in cited product specifications	Decode	
Wildcat Lake	Encode and decode	Encode and decode	Encode and decode	Not specified in cited product specifications	No	

“Not listed” indicates that the cited media-driver matrix does not advertise the codec for that platform; it is not a claim about software decoding. The matrix lists VVC decoding for Lunar Lake and Panther Lake, but not for discrete Battlemage GPUs.

=== Intel Pentium and Celeron family ===
Intel Pentium & Celeron family	GPU video acceleration								
Intel Pentium & Celeron family	VED (Video Encode / Decode)		H.265/HEVC	H.264/MPEG-4 AVC	H.262 (MPEG-2)	VC-1/WMV9	JPEG/MJPEG	VP8	VP9
Braswell (Note: VP9 media codec GPU accelerator to be supported post TTM, for non-Windows operating systems only.) (Note: Resolution details for media codec on open source Linux OS depends on platform features and drivers used. Decode/Encode features may not align to Table 8-4 that is specific to Win8.1 and Win7 operating systems.) (Note: All capabilities dependent on OS. Here HW support is mentioned. For more info, see Table 8-4 on page 80 of PDF.)	Decode	Profile	Main	CBP, Main, High	Main, High	Advanced	850 MP/s 4:2:0; 640 MP/s 4:2:2; 420 MP/s 4:4:4		
Braswell	Decode	Level	5	5.2	High	4	850 MP/s 4:2:0; 640 MP/s 4:2:2; 420 MP/s 4:4:4		
Braswell	Decode	Max. resolution	4k×2k/30p	4k×2k/60p	1080/60p	1080/60p	850 MP/s 4:2:0; 640 MP/s 4:2:2; 420 MP/s 4:4:4	4k×2k/60p	1080/30p
Braswell	Encode	Profile	✘	CBP, Main, High	Main, High	✘	850 MP/s 4:2:0; 640 MP/s 4:2:2; 420 MP/s 4:4:4		Up to 720p30
Braswell	Encode	Level	✘	5.1	High	✘	850 MP/s 4:2:0; 640 MP/s 4:2:2; 420 MP/s 4:4:4		
Braswell	Encode	Max. resolution	✘	4k×2k/30p	1080/30p	✘	850 MP/s 4:2:0; 640 MP/s 4:2:2; 420 MP/s 4:4:4	4k×2k/30p	
Apollo Lake	Decode	Profile	Main, Main 10	CBP, Main, High	Main, High	Advanced	1067 MP/s 4:2:0 800 MP/s 4:2:2 533 MP/s 4:4:4		0
Apollo Lake	Decode	Level	5.1	5.2	High	4	1067 MP/s 4:2:0 800 MP/s 4:2:2 533 MP/s 4:4:4		
Apollo Lake	Decode	Max. resolution		1080p240, 4k×2k/60p	1080/60p	1080/60p	1067 MP/s 4:2:0 800 MP/s 4:2:2 533 MP/s 4:4:4		
Apollo Lake	Encode	Profile	Main	CBP, Main, High	✘	✘	1067 MP/s 4:2:0 800 MP/s 4:2:2 533 MP/s 4:4:4		
Apollo Lake	Encode	Level	5	5.2	✘	✘	1067 MP/s 4:2:0 800 MP/s 4:2:2 533 MP/s 4:4:4		
Apollo Lake	Encode	Max. resolution	4k×2k/30p	1080p240, 4k×2k/60p	✘	✘	1067 MP/s 4:2:0 800 MP/s 4:2:2 533 MP/s 4:4:4	4k×2k/30p	480p30 (SW only)
Gemini Lake	Decode	Profile	Main, Main 10	CBP, Main, High	Main, High	Advanced	1067 MP/s 4:2:0 800 MP/s 4:2:2 533 MP/s 4:4:4		0, 2
Gemini Lake	Decode	Level	5.1	5.2	High	4	1067 MP/s 4:2:0 800 MP/s 4:2:2 533 MP/s 4:4:4		
Gemini Lake	Decode	Max. resolution		1080p240, 4k×2k/60p	1080/60p	1080/60p	1067 MP/s 4:2:0 800 MP/s 4:2:2 533 MP/s 4:4:4		
Gemini Lake	Encode	Profile	Main	CBP, Main, High	Main, High	✘	1067 MP/s 4:2:0 800 MP/s 4:2:2 533 MP/s 4:4:4		0
Gemini Lake	Encode	Level	4	5.2	High	✘	1067 MP/s 4:2:0 800 MP/s 4:2:2 533 MP/s 4:4:4		
Gemini Lake	Encode	Max. resolution	4k×2k/30p	1080p240, 4k×2k/60p	1080/60p	✘	1067 MP/s 4:2:0 800 MP/s 4:2:2 533 MP/s 4:4:4	4k×2k/30p	

=== Intel Atom family ===
Intel Atom family	GPU video acceleration										
Intel Atom family	VED (Video Encode / Decode)		H.265/HEVC	H.264/MPEG-4 AVC	MPEG-4 Visual	H.263	H.262 (MPEG-2)	VC-1/WMV9	JPEG/MJPEG	VP8	VP9
Bay Trail-T	Decode	Profile	✘	Main, High			Main			0	✘
Bay Trail-T	Decode	Level	✘	5.1			High				✘
Bay Trail-T	Decode	Max. resolution	✘	4k×2k/30p			1080/60p	4k×2k/30p	4k×2k/30p		✘
Bay Trail-T	Encode	Profile	✘	Main, High			Main	-	-		✘
Bay Trail-T	Encode	Level	✘	5.1			High	-	-		✘
Bay Trail-T	Encode	Max. resolution	✘	4k×2k/30p			1080/60p	1080/30p	-	1080/30p	✘
Cherry Trail-T	Decode	Profile	Main	CBP, Main, High	Simple		Main	Advanced	1067 Mbit/s – 4:2:0 800 Mbit/s – 4:2:2		
Cherry Trail-T	Decode	Level	5	5.2			High	4	1067 Mbit/s – 4:2:0 800 Mbit/s – 4:2:2		
Cherry Trail-T	Decode	Max. resolution	4k×2k/30p	4k×2k/60p, 1080@240p	480/30p	480/30p	1080/60p	1080/60p	1067 Mbit/s – 4:2:0 800 Mbit/s – 4:2:2	4k×2k/30p	1080/30p
Cherry Trail-T	Encode	Profile	✘	Constrained Baseline, Main, High (MVC)					1067 Mbit/s – 4:2:0 800 Mbit/s – 4:2:2		✘
Cherry Trail-T	Encode	Level	✘	5.1 (4.2)					1067 Mbit/s – 4:2:0 800 Mbit/s – 4:2:2		✘
Cherry Trail-T	Encode	Max. resolution	✘	4k×2k/30p, 1080@120p		480/30p			1067 Mbit/s – 4:2:0 800 Mbit/s – 4:2:2	4k×2k/30p	✘

== Documentation ==
Intel publishes graphics programmer’s reference manuals describing registers, instructions, memory interfaces and device behavior. Its support documentation directs developers to the Intel Graphics for Linux programmer’s-reference collection.

== See also ==
- Graphics card
- Intel Arc
- Intel Xe
- AMD APU
- Free and open-source graphics device driver
- List of Intel graphics processing units
- List of Nvidia graphics processing units
- List of AMD graphics processing units
