= Halt and Catch Fire =

Halt and Catch Fire may refer to:

- Halt and Catch Fire (computing), idiom referring to a computer machine code instruction
- Halt and Catch Fire (TV series), American television series
- "Halt & Catch Fire", an episode in season 10 of American television series Supernatural
