= Opcode table =

Visual representation of all opcodes in an instruction set

An opcode table (also called an opcode matrix) is a visual representation of all opcodes in an instruction set. It is arranged such that each axis of the table represents an upper or lower nibble, which combined form the full byte of the opcode. Additional opcode tables can exist for additional instructions created using an opcode prefix.

== Table values ==
The structure and arrangement of an opcode table appears as follows:

	0	1	2	3	4	5	6	7	8	9	A	B	C	D	E	F
0	00	01	02	03	04	05	06	07	08	09	0A	0B	0C	0D	0E	0F
1	10	11	12	13	14	15	16	17	18	19	1A	1B	1C	1D	1E	1F
2	20	21	22	23	24	25	26	27	28	29	2A	2B	2C	2D	2E	2F
3	30	31	32	33	34	35	36	37	38	39	3A	3B	3C	3D	3E	3F
4	40	41	42	43	44	45	46	47	48	49	4A	4B	4C	4D	4E	4F
5	50	51	52	53	54	55	56	57	58	59	5A	5B	5C	5D	5E	5F
6	60	61	62	63	64	65	66	67	68	69	6A	6B	6C	6D	6E	6F
7	70	71	72	73	74	75	76	77	78	79	7A	7B	7C	7D	7E	7F
8	80	81	82	83	84	85	86	87	88	89	8A	8B	8C	8D	8E	8F
9	90	91	92	93	94	95	96	97	98	99	9A	9B	9C	9D	9E	9F
A	A0	A1	A2	A3	A4	A5	A6	A7	A8	A9	AA	AB	AC	AD	AE	AF
B	B0	B1	B2	B3	B4	B5	B6	B7	B8	B9	BA	BB	BC	BD	BE	BF
C	C0	C1	C2	C3	C4	C5	C6	C7	C8	C9	CA	CB	CC	CD	CE	CF
D	D0	D1	D2	D3	D4	D5	D6	D7	D8	D9	DA	DB	DC	DD	DE	DF
E	E0	E1	E2	E3	E4	E5	E6	E7	E8	E9	EA	EB	EC	ED	EE	EF
F	F0	F1	F2	F3	F4	F5	F6	F7	F8	F9	FA	FB	FC	FD	FE	FF

Each cell from 00–FF contains information about the operation such as the equivalent assembly instruction corresponding to the opcode, parameters, and CPU cycle counts.

== Example opcode table ==
This is the opcode table for the MOS Technology 6502 microprocessor from 1975. The 6502 uses 8-bit opcodes. Of the 256 possible opcodes available using an 8-bit pattern, the original 6502 uses only 151 of them, organized into 56 instructions with (possibly) multiple addressing modes. Because not all 256 opcodes are used, some opcode spaces are blank and the low nibble columns 3, 7, B, and F are missing from the table.

Opcode matrix for the 6502 instruction set
Addressing modes: A – accumulator, # – immediate, zpg – zero page, abs – absolute, ind – indirect, X – indexed by X register, Y – indexed by Y register, rel – relative
High nibble	Low nibble											
High nibble	0	1	2	4	5	6	8	9	A	C	D	E
0	BRK	ORA (ind,X)			ORA zpg	ASL zpg	PHP	ORA #	ASL A		ORA abs	ASL abs
1	BPL rel	ORA (ind),Y			ORA zpg,X	ASL zpg,X	CLC	ORA abs,Y			ORA abs,X	ASL abs,X
2	JSR abs	AND (ind,X)		BIT zpg	AND zpg	ROL zpg	PLP	AND #	ROL A	BIT abs	AND abs	ROL abs
3	BMI rel	AND (ind),Y			AND zpg,X	ROL zpg,X	SEC	AND abs,Y			AND abs,X	ROL abs,X
4	RTI	EOR (ind,X)			EOR zpg	LSR zpg	PHA	EOR #	LSR A	JMP abs	EOR abs	LSR abs
5	BVC rel	EOR (ind),Y			EOR zpg,X	LSR zpg,X	CLI	EOR abs,Y			EOR abs,X	LSR abs,X
6	RTS	ADC (ind,X)			ADC zpg	ROR zpg	PLA	ADC #	ROR A	JMP (ind)	ADC abs	ROR abs
7	BVS rel	ADC (ind),Y			ADC zpg,X	ROR zpg,X	SEI	ADC abs,Y			ADC abs,X	ROR abs,X
8		STA (ind,X)		STY zpg	STA zpg	STX zpg	DEY		TXA	STY abs	STA abs	STX abs
9	BCC rel	STA (ind),Y		STY zpg,X	STA zpg,X	STX zpg,Y	TYA	STA abs,Y	TXS		STA abs,X	
A	LDY #	LDA (ind,X)	LDX #	LDY zpg	LDA zpg	LDX zpg	TAY	LDA #	TAX	LDY abs	LDA abs	LDX abs
B	BCS rel	LDA (ind),Y		LDY zpg,X	LDA zpg,X	LDX zpg,Y	CLV	LDA abs,Y	TSX	LDY abs,X	LDA abs,X	LDX abs,Y
C	CPY #	CMP (ind,X)		CPY zpg	CMP zpg	DEC zpg	INY	CMP #	DEX	CPY abs	CMP abs	DEC abs
D	BNE rel	CMP (ind),Y			CMP zpg,X	DEC zpg,X	CLD	CMP abs,Y			CMP abs,X	DEC abs,X
E	CPX #	SBC (ind,X)		CPX zpg	SBC zpg	INC zpg	INX	SBC #	NOP	CPX abs	SBC abs	INC abs
F	BEQ rel	SBC (ind),Y			SBC zpg,X	INC zpg,X	SED	SBC abs,Y			SBC abs,X	INC abs,X
