= FOOF =

FOOF may refer to:

- Flags of Our Fathers, a book about the Battle of Iwo Jima
  - Flags of Our Fathers (film), a film based on the book
- Independent Order of Odd Fellows (Fraternal Order of Odd Fellows)
- Pentium F00F bug, a design flaw in early Intel microprocessors
- Foof (artist), former drummer with The Bloodhound Gang
- Dioxygen difluoride, a chemical compound with the formula FOOF
