= COP400 =

4-bit microcontroller family

National Semiconductor COP400
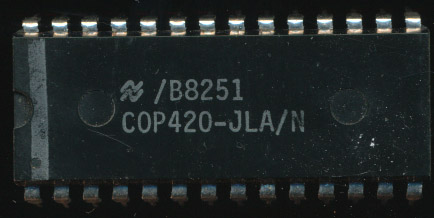
- National Semiconductor COP420 in 28-pin plastic DIP. Late 1982 date code.

General information
- Launched: 1977; 49 years ago
- Common manufacturer: National Semiconductor; Western Digital

Performance
- Max. CPU clock rate: to 250 KHz
- Data width: 4 (RAM), 8 (ROM)
- Address width: 7 (RAM), 11 (ROM)

Physical specifications
- Package: 24, 28, 40-pin DIP

Architecture and classification
- Application: Embedded
- Instruction set: COP400
- Number of instructions: 40

History
- Predecessor: MM5799 (PMOS COP)
- Successor: COP8

The COP400 or COP II is a 4-bit microcontroller family introduced in 1977 by National Semiconductor as a follow-on product to their original PMOS COP microcontroller. COP400 family members are complete microcomputers containing internal timing, logic, ROM, RAM, and I/O necessary to implement dedicated controllers. Some COP400 devices were second-sourced by Western Digital as the WD4200 family. In the Soviet Union several COP400 microcontrollers were manufactured as the 1820 series (e.g. the COP402 with designation КР1820ВЕ1). As of 1990, about 40 million COP400 devices were sold each year.

The COP400 is implemented in CMOS or N-channel silicon gate MOS technology. It was typically packaged in 24- or 28-pin DIP packages. Instruction cycle time of the faster family members is 4 microseconds. The COP400 family offered several memory and pinout configurations.

Notable products that used COP400-family chips include the Apple Lisa, Milton Bradley and Mattel electronic games, Coleco Head to Head Basketball, and the Grundy Newbrain.

== Memory ==
The COP400 uses separate memory spaces for ROM and RAM. ROM addresses are 11-bit maximum, while data addresses are 7-bit maximum.

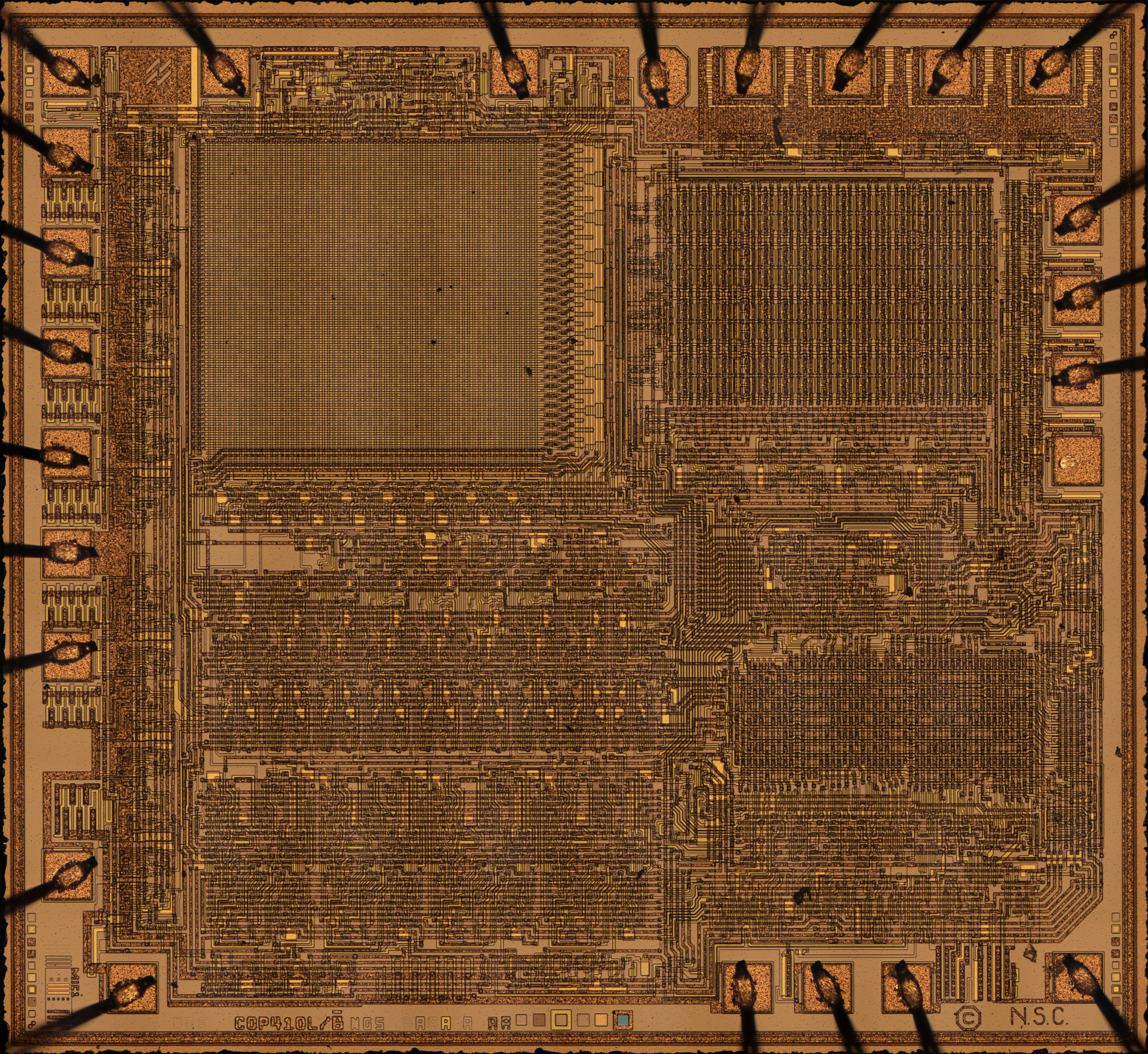
National Semiconductor COP410L die image. 512 bytes of ROM in upper left corner, 128 bits of RAM in upper right corner. Click to zoom.

=== ROM ===
Program memory consists of a 512, 1024, or 2048 × 8-bit ROM. ROM bytes may be program instructions, program data, or jump address pointers. Due to the special characteristics associated with the JP and JSRP instructions, ROM must often be conceived of as organized into pages of 64 bytes each. Also, because of the unique operations performed by the LQID and JID instructions, ROM pages must sometimes be thought of as organized into blocks of 256 bytes.

=== RAM ===
Data memory consists of a 32, 64, or 128 × 4-bit RAM, organized as several data registers of 16 4-bit digits. RAM addressing is implemented by the 6- or 7-bit B register used as a pointer. The B register's upper 2 or 3 bits (Br) select one of 4 or 8 data registers and lower 4 bits (Bd) select one of 16 4-bit digits in the selected data register. The 4-bit contents of the RAM digit pointed to by the B register are usually loaded into, exchanged with, or operate on the A register.

== CPU registers ==
COP400 registers
^{1}_{0}	^{0}_{9}	^{0}_{8}	^{0}_{7}	^{0}_{6}	^{0}_{5}	^{0}_{4}	^{0}_{3}	^{0}_{2}	^{0}_{1}	^{0}_{0}	(bit position)
							A				Accumulator
							SIO				Serial I/O
				Br			Bd				B (pointer)
			Q								Byte Register
PC (high)					PC (page)						Program Counter
SA											Stack Registers
SB
SC
Status flag
										C	Carry Flag

The register configuration shown in the diagram is for the COP400 family members with maximum ROM (2048 × 8 bits) and RAM (128 × 4 bits). Family members with only 512 or 1024 bytes of ROM will have only a 9- or 10-bit PC. Those with 64 or 32 locations of RAM will have only a 2-bit Br register.

The 4-bit A register (accumulator) is the source and destination register for most arithmetic, logic, and data memory access operations. It can also be used to load the Br and Bd portions of the B register, to load and input 4 bits of the 8-bit Q latch data, to input 4 bits of the 8-bit L port and to perform data exchanges with the SIO register.

When transferring data to an 8-bit register (such as Q or an 8-bit I/O port), the least significant 4 bits are taken from RAM(B), the RAM location pointed to by the B register, and the most significant 4 bits are taken from A. When transferring data from an 8-bit register, the halves are reversed: the least significant 4 bits are written to A, and the most significant 4 bits are written to RAM(B).

A 4-bit ALU performs the arithmetic and logic functions, storing results in A. ASC and CASC operations output a carry to the 1-bit C register, most often employed to indicate arithmetic overflow.

All ROM addressing is accomplished via the 9-, 10-, or 11-bit PC register. Its binary value selects one of the bytes contained in ROM, usually the next program instruction. The value of PC is automatically incremented by 1 prior to the execution of the current instruction to point to the next sequential ROM location. This ensures that when executing a subroutine call, the saved PC is the address of the next instruction, and when executing any control transfer, the target address written to PC is used unmodified. The PC automatically rolls over to point to the next 64 byte page or 256 byte block of program memory. The upper bits of PC are also used to complete the 8-bit addresses specified by the JID and LQID instructions.

Three levels of subroutine are implemented by the subroutine save registers, SA, SB, and SC, providing a last-in, first-out (LIFO) hardware call stack. Some implementations do not have a SC. One implementation detail is that the LQID instruction uses one level of the stack. The ROM address to be fetched from is copied to the PC register, and the stack is used to temporarily save its value, so LQID has the side effect of overwriting SC with a copy of SB.

== I/O registers and ports ==
There are no port numbers or memory addresses associated with the COP400 I/O devices. All the physical I/O registers and ports are referenced by the COP400 assembly language directly by name.

=== Baseline ===
Nearly all COP400 family devices implement the following:

- Four general-purpose inputs, IN_{0}-IN_{3}, are provided. 24-pin packages do not have IN_{0}-IN_{3}.
- The D register provides four general purpose outputs and is the destination register for the 4-bit contents of Bd. The D register is useful for synchronizing up to 16 external devices associated with the RAM pointed to by the B register.
- The G register contains four general purpose bidirectional I/O ports.
- The Q register is an internal, latched, 8-bit register used to hold data loaded to or from RAM(B) and A, as well as 8-bit program data from ROM. Its contents are output to the L ports when the L drivers are enabled under program control. Also, the contents of L may be read directly into A and RAM(B).
- The SIO register functions as a 4-bit serial-in/serial-out shift register or as a binary counter depending on the contents of the EN register. SIO can be synchronously exchanged with A, allowing it to input or output a continuous serial data stream. When not being used as a shift register or counter, it can store the contents of A.
- The EN register is an internal 4-bit register loaded under program control by the LEI instruction. The state of this register selects or deselects a particular feature associated with each bit.
- Though not directly accessible with software, the 10-bit time base counter divides the instruction cycle frequency by 1,024, setting a flag upon overflow. The SKT instruction tests for the occurrence of this flag (and if set, resets it) allowing the programmer to implement timer routines. Some low-end COP400 family members do not have this time base counter nor the SKT instruction. Some high-end COP400 devices can read and write the upper eight bits of the timer.

=== High end ===
There are a few high end members of the COP400 family such as the COP440 and COP2440 that have 40-pins. These have additional registers and ports:

- The R port is an additional eight-bit bidirectional I/O port, similar to Q. The R port contains latches and drivers. Data to be output is latched into the R register. The input path is from the pins to the accumulator and RAM. Input data at the R pins are not latched into the R register by any external signal. This must be done indirectly by the program. The R drivers, like the L drivers, can be put into a high impedance state.
- These devices have an additional bidirectional four-bit port, the H port. The H port is essentially a duplicate of the G port except that H cannot be directly tested.
- The EN register is expanded to 8 bits. EN_{4}-EN_{5} select interrupt sources. EN_{6} selects the source of the T counter. EN_{7} controls the output drivers of the R port. The 8-bit EN is written with the CAME instruction and read with CEMA. The lower 4 bits can be written with LEI.

== Instruction set ==
The COP400 family is designed to have very compact code. All instructions are one or two bytes long. The most frequently used instructions are one byte. In some cases there are special one-byte forms of two-byte instructions. Some features that can be used to make object code more compact are:

- The LBI instruction loads the seven-bit B register with an immediate value. The general-form instruction takes two bytes. There is a one-byte form of LBI that can only set Br to 0, 1, 2, and 3 and can only set Bd to 9, 10, 11, 12, 13, 14, 15, and 0 (decimal). The single byte LBI can access 32 RAM locations.
- Multiple LBI instructions can be stacked in series. Only the first LBI will be executed. Subsequent LBI instructions will execute as NOPs. This allows multiple entry points with different starting addresses for a shared routine.
- JSR, in the general subroutine branch form, is two bytes and can access any memory location directly. JSRP is a single-byte subroutine branch that can access only the locations in the third 64-byte page. This page is called the subroutine page or page 2, numbered from zero. A JSRP cannot be coded from inside page 2 or 3.
- JMP, in the general branch form, is two bytes and can access any memory location directly. JP is a single-byte branch that can access any location in the current 64-byte page. The upper bits of PC remain unchanged. If the JP instruction is executed inside page 2 or 3, then it can access any of the 128 addresses in pages 2 and 3. This is useful for creating a one byte JSRP entry point in page 2 that can then branch to a subroutine on page 3 with a single byte JP.
- The B register can be used to point to up to four RAM strings with little overhead. The LD, X, XIS, and XDS memory access instructions can Exclusive OR the lower two bits of Br with a two-bit immediate. This allows the register portion of B (Br) to be flipped to one of the other digit strings that share the same digit (Bd) address.
- The Bd register portion can be used as a memory pointer and a loop counter simultaneously. The XIS instruction will skip if Bd, after incrementing, overflows to zero, falling through the loop. Likewise the XDS instruction will skip if Bd, after decrementing, underflows to 15 (decimal).

COP400 family instruction set
Opcode								Operand	Mnemonic	Description	Skip
7	6	5	4	3	2	1	0	Operand	Mnemonic	Description	Skip
0	0	0	0	0	0	0	0	—	CLRA	A ← 0	—
0	0	0	b_{0}	0	0	b_{1}	1	—	SKMBZ b	Skip if memory bit zero	RAM(B)_{b} = 0
0	0	0	0	0	0	1	0	—	XOR	A ← A ⊻ RAM(B)	—
0	0	0	1	0	0	0	0	—	CASC	A ← ~A + RAM(B) + C, C ← Carry	carry
0	0	0	1	0	0	1	0	—	XABR	A ↔ Br, A_{3} ← 0	—
0	0	1	0	0	0	0	0	—	SKC	—	C = 1
0	0	1	0	0	0	0	1	—	SKE	—	A = RAM(B)
0	0	1	0	0	0	1	0	—	SC	C ← 1	—
0	0	1	0	0	0	1	1	0rrrdddd	LDD r,d	A ← RAM(r,d)	—
0	0	1	0	0	0	1	1	1rrrdddd	XAD r,d	A ↔ RAM(r,d)	—
0	0	1	1	0	0	0	0	—	ASC	A ← A + RAM(B) + C, C ← Carry	carry
0	0	1	1	0	0	0	1	—	ADD	A ← A + RAM(B)	—
0	0	1	1	0	0	1	0	—	RC	C ← 0	—
0	0	1	1	0	0	1	1	opcode	33H prefix	See table below for instructions with this prefix	—
0	0	r		0	1	0	0	—	XIS r	A ↔ RAM(B), Br ← Br ⊻ r, Bd ← Bd + 1	Bd = 0
0	0	r		0	1	0	1	—	LD r	A ← RAM(B), Br ← Br ⊻ r	—
0	0	r		0	1	1	0	—	X r	A ↔ RAM(B), Br ← Br ⊻ r	—
0	0	r		0	1	1	1	—	XDS r	A ↔ RAM(B), Br ← Br ⊻ r, Bd ← Bd - 1	Bd = 15
0	0	r		1	d			—	LBI r,d	Br ← r, Bd ← (d+9)∧15 (Br = 0–3, Bd = 9–15, 0)	next LBI
0	1	0	0	0	0	0	0	—	COMP	A ← ~A	—
0	1	0	0	0	0	0	1	—	SKT	Skip on timer overflow	timer
0	1	0	0	n				—	RMB n	RAM(B)_{n} ← 0 (0, 1, 2, 3 encoded 0xC 0x5 0x2 0x3)	—
0	1	0	0	n				—	SMB n	RAM(B)_{n} ← 1 (0, 1, 2, 3 encoded 0xD 0x7 0x6 0xB)	—
0	1	0	0	0	1	0	0	—	NOP	No operation	—
0	1	0	0	1	0	0	0	—	RET	Pop PC (PC ← SA, SA ← SB, SB ← SC)	—
0	1	0	0	1	0	0	1	—	RETSK	Pop PC	always
0	1	0	0	1	0	1	0	—	ADT	A ← A + 10	—
0	1	0	0	1	1	1	0	—	CBA	A ← Bd	—
0	1	0	0	1	1	1	1	—	XAS	A ↔ SIO, SK ← C	—
0	1	0	1	0	0	0	0	—	CAB	Bd ← A	—
0	1	0	1	y				—	AISC y	A ← A + y (1 ≤ y ≤ 15, C unchanged)	carry
0	1	1	0	0	addhi			addlo	JMP a	PC[10:8] ← addhi, PC[7:0] ← addlo	—
0	1	1	0	1	addhi			addlo	JSR a	Push PC, PC[10:8] ← addhi, PC[7:0] ← addlo	—
0	1	1	1	y				—	STII y	RAM(B) ← y, Bd ← Bd + 1	—
1	addr							—	JP a	If PC[10:7] = 0001: PC[6:0] ← addr	—
1	0	addr						—	JSRP a	If PC[10:7] ≠ 0001: Push PC, PC[10:6] ← 00010, PC[5:0] ← addr	—
1	0	1	1	1	1	1	1	—	LQID	Q ← ROM(PC[10:8], A, RAM(B)), SC ← SB	—
1	1	addr						—	JP a	If PC[10:7] ≠ 0001: PC[5:0] ← addr	—
1	1	1	1	1	1	1	1	—	JID	PC[7:0] ← ROM(PC[10:8], A, RAM(B))	—
7	6	5	4	3	2	1	0	Operand	Mnemonic	Description	Skip

2-byte opcodes prefixed with 33H (support depends on CPU type)
Opcode								Mnemonic	Description	Skip	CPU Types
7	6	5	4	3	2	1	0	Mnemonic	Description	Skip	CPU Types
0	0	0	b_{0}	0	0	b_{1}	1	SKGBZ b	—	G_{b} = 0	All
0	0	0	0	1	0	1	1	XAN	A[1:0] ↔ N, A[2:3] ← 0	—	3
0	0	0	0	1	1	1	1	CEMA	RAM(B) ← EN[7:4], A ← EN[3:0]	—	3
0	0	0	1	1	0	0	1	LID	RAM(B), A ← ROM(PC[10:8], A, RAM(B))	—	3
0	0	0	1	1	0	1	0	OR	A ← A ∨ RAM(B)	—	3
0	0	0	1	1	1	0	0	SKSZ	—	SIO = 0	3
0	0	0	1	1	1	1	1	CAME	EN[7:4] ← A, EN[3:0] ← RAM(B)	—	3
0	0	1	0	0	0	0	1	SKGZ	—	G = 0	All
0	0	1	0	1	0	0	0	ININ	A ← IN	—	2, 3
0	0	1	0	1	0	0	1	INIL	A ← IL_{3}, 1, 0, IL_{0} or A ← IL_{3}, CKO, 0, IL_{0}	—	2, 3
0	0	1	0	1	0	1	0	ING	A ← G	—	All
0	0	1	0	1	0	1	1	INH	A ← H	—	3
0	0	1	0	1	1	0	0	CQMA	RAM(B) ← Q[7:4], A ← Q[3:0]	—	2, 3
0	0	1	0	1	1	0	1	INR	RAM(B) ← R[7:4], A ← R[3:0]	—	3
0	0	1	0	1	1	1	0	INL	RAM(B) ← L[7:4], A ← L[3:0]	—	All
0	0	1	0	1	1	1	1	CTMA	RAM(B) ← T[7:4], A ← T[3:0]	—	3
0	0	1	1	1	0	0	0	HALT	Stop operation	—	CMOS
0	0	1	1	1	0	0	1	IT	Stop until timer overflow	—	CMOS
0	0	1	1	1	0	1	0	OMG	G ← RAM(B)	—	All
0	0	1	1	1	0	1	1	OMH	H ← RAM(B)	—	3
0	0	1	1	1	1	0	0	CAMQ	Q[7:4] ← A, Q[3:0] ← RAM(B)	—	All
0	0	1	1	1	1	0	1	CAMR	R[7:4] ← A, R[3:0] ← RAM(B)	—	3
0	0	1	1	1	1	1	0	OBD	D ← Bd	—	All
0	0	1	1	1	1	1	1	CAMT	T[7:4] ← A, T[3:0] ← RAM(B)	—	3
0	1	0	1	y				OGI y	G ← y	—	2, 3
0	1	1	0	y				LEI y	EN ← y	—	All
1	r			d				LBI r,d	Br ← r, Bd ← d	next LBI	2, 3
7	6	5	4	3	2	1	0	Mnemonic	Description	Skip	Types supported

Types supported: Type 1 is very low-end such as COP410. Type 2, such as the COP420, is most common. Type 3 typically have resources to support 40 pins even if package does not have 40 pins. Type 4 is not shown as there is no evidence that Type 4 was produced. CMOS includes COP424C, COP425C, COP426C, COP444C, COP445C, COP404C.

=== Example code ===
This example code demonstrates several of the space saving features on the instruction set:

- single-byte LBI instructions
- multiple LBI instructions in series creating multiple entry points
- LD XORing Br so B is flipped to the destination and XIS flipping B back to source
- Bd sharing pointer and loop counter duties via the skip function in XIS
- single byte jump, JP

 
 
 
 
 
 
040 09     
041 19     
042 2F     


043 15     
044 14     
045 C3     
046 48

; Copy a block of memory from one location to another.
;
; There are three entry points: copyA, copyB, and copyC.
; The values of the LBI instructions are expressed as
; LBI Br, Bd.
;
copyA:      LBI     0,10        ;Copy 6 nibbles starting 0,10 to 1,10
copyB:      LBI     1,10        ;Copy 6 nibbles starting 1,10 to 0,10
copyC:      LBI     2,0         ;Copy 16 nibbles starting 2,0 to 3,0
; Note that copy: is a universal routine that can copy from
; 1 to 16 digits from page 0 to 1, 1 to 0, 2 to 3, and 3 to 2.
copy:       LD      1           ;Load src in A. XOR Br with 1 to get dest
            XIS     1           ;Save A in dest. Inc Bd. XOR Br with 1 to get src
            JP      copy        ;loop until Bd goes past last digit location
            RET

== Interrupt ==
Early COP400 devices that have 28 pins or more support a single interrupt. The IN 1 line is used as the interrupt input. Interrupt is enabled by setting bit 1 of the EN register to 1 with a LEI instruction. In response to low-going pulse of at least two instruction cycles long on IN 1, all transfer of control instructions such as JP are completed and all sequential LBI instructions are executed. The PC is then pushed on the subroutine stack and control is transferred to the interrupt handler at address 0xFF. No subroutines may be called in the interrupt service routine on devices with a hardware stack. Curiously, later devices such as the COP440 support four interrupt sources and two service routines but only one interrupt source can be selected at a time. Subroutines are supported inside interrupt service routines on devices with a stack pointer.

== Architectural extensions ==
Although the majority of COP400 devices were targeted at low-end applications, several extensions to the architecture were created to address more demanding applications. Dual CPU, a deeper stack in RAM, and larger address spaces were added to some devices by 1985.

=== Dual CPU ===
COP400 with stack pointer
^{1}_{0}	^{0}_{9}	^{0}_{8}	^{0}_{7}	^{0}_{6}	^{0}_{5}	^{0}_{4}	^{0}_{3}	^{0}_{2}	^{0}_{1}	^{0}_{0}	(bit position)
							A				Accumulator
							SIO				Serial I/O
			Br				Bd				B (pointer)
			Q								Byte Register
			1 0 0 0				N		0 0		Stack Pointer
PC (high)					PC (page)						Program Counter
Status flag
										C	Carry Flag
(COP440 shown)

"Dual CPU" versions of the COP400 were announced by National Semiconductor in 1981. These single-chip barrel processors contain two ostensibly independent CPUs that share instructions, memory, and most I/O devices. In reality, the CPUs are not fully independent and share hardware resources similar to Intel processors with Hyper-Threading Technology (HTT). Like HTT, the dual CPU version works by duplicating certain sections of the processor—those that store the architectural state—but not duplicating the main execution resources such as ALU, buses, and memory. Separate architectural states for each of the two virtual processors is established with duplicated A (accumulators), B (pointer registers), C (carry flags), N (stack pointers), and PC (program counters).

When the reset is deasserted, both processors start at location 0 which contains a CLRA instruction, then one processor jumps to location 401 (hex) followed an instruction cycle later by the second processor executing location 1. The processors will then alternately execute one byte of code each.

At maximum clock frequency, the instruction execution time (single byte instruction) for each processor is 4 microseconds, hence, the instruction cycle time for either processor is twice that amount, 8 microseconds.

Some dual CPU versions include the 40-pin COP2440N, the 28-pin COP2441N, and the 24-pin COP2442N.

=== Return stack in RAM ===
Earlier COP400 devices included a two or three level dedicated hardware return stack. Later devices such as the COP440 feature a 4-level return stack implemented with a 2-bit stack pointer and RAM. Dual CPU versions have two separate 4-level return stacks implemented with two 2-bit stack pointers and two different RAM areas.

=== Larger address space ===
The basic COP400 instruction set supports ROM addresses of up to 11-bits (2,048 bytes), while data addresses are 7-bits maximum (128 locations). The so-called group 4 devices extended the memory limit by adding three-byte JMP, JSR, and LBI instructions with more address bits. These support ROM addresses of 15-bits maximum (32,768 bytes), while data addresses are 9-bits maximum (512 locations). Devices that support these instructions include COP408, COP484, COP485, COP409. It is unclear whether any of these group 4 devices were produced.

== Applications ==
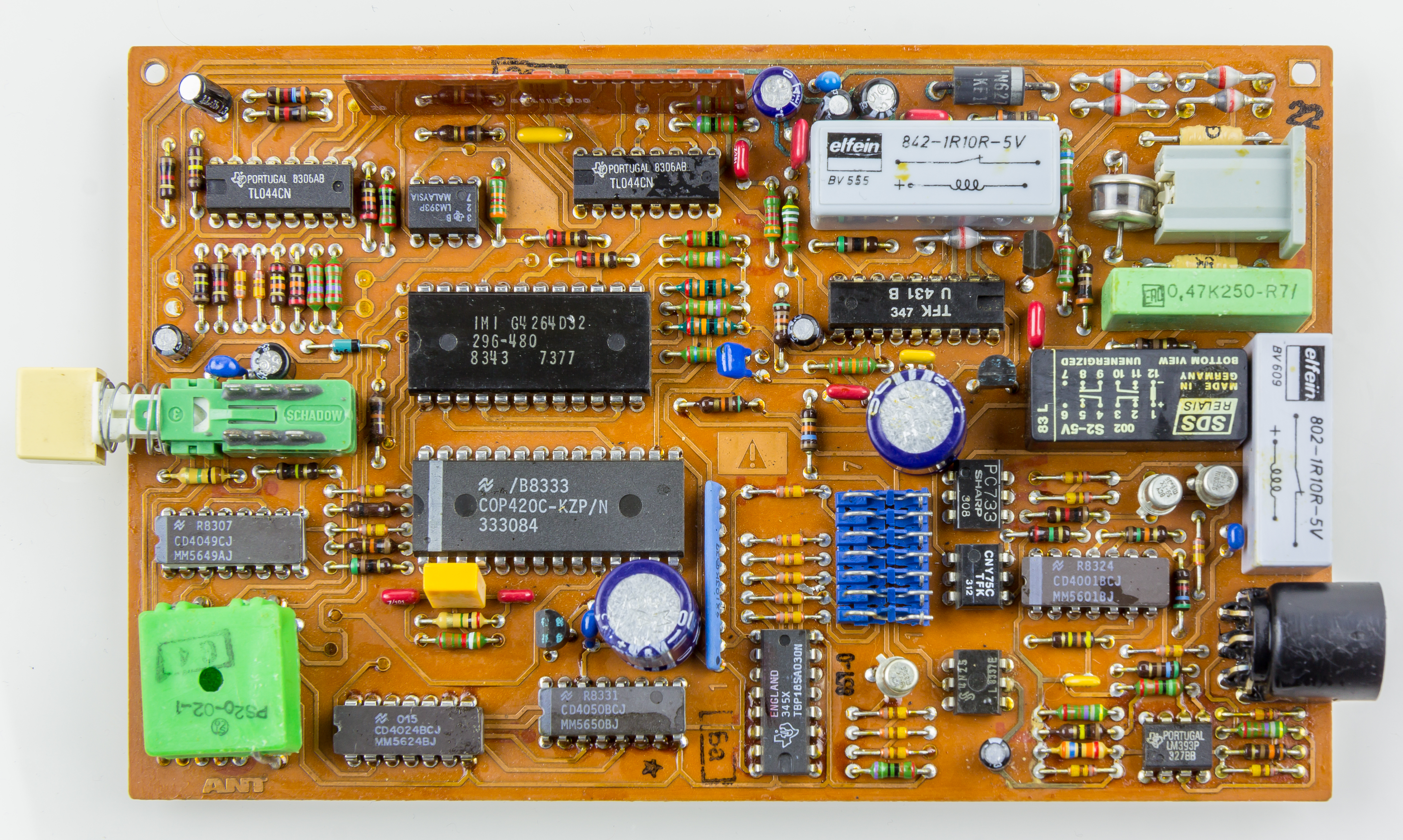
COP420C used in a DBT-03 1200 baud modem

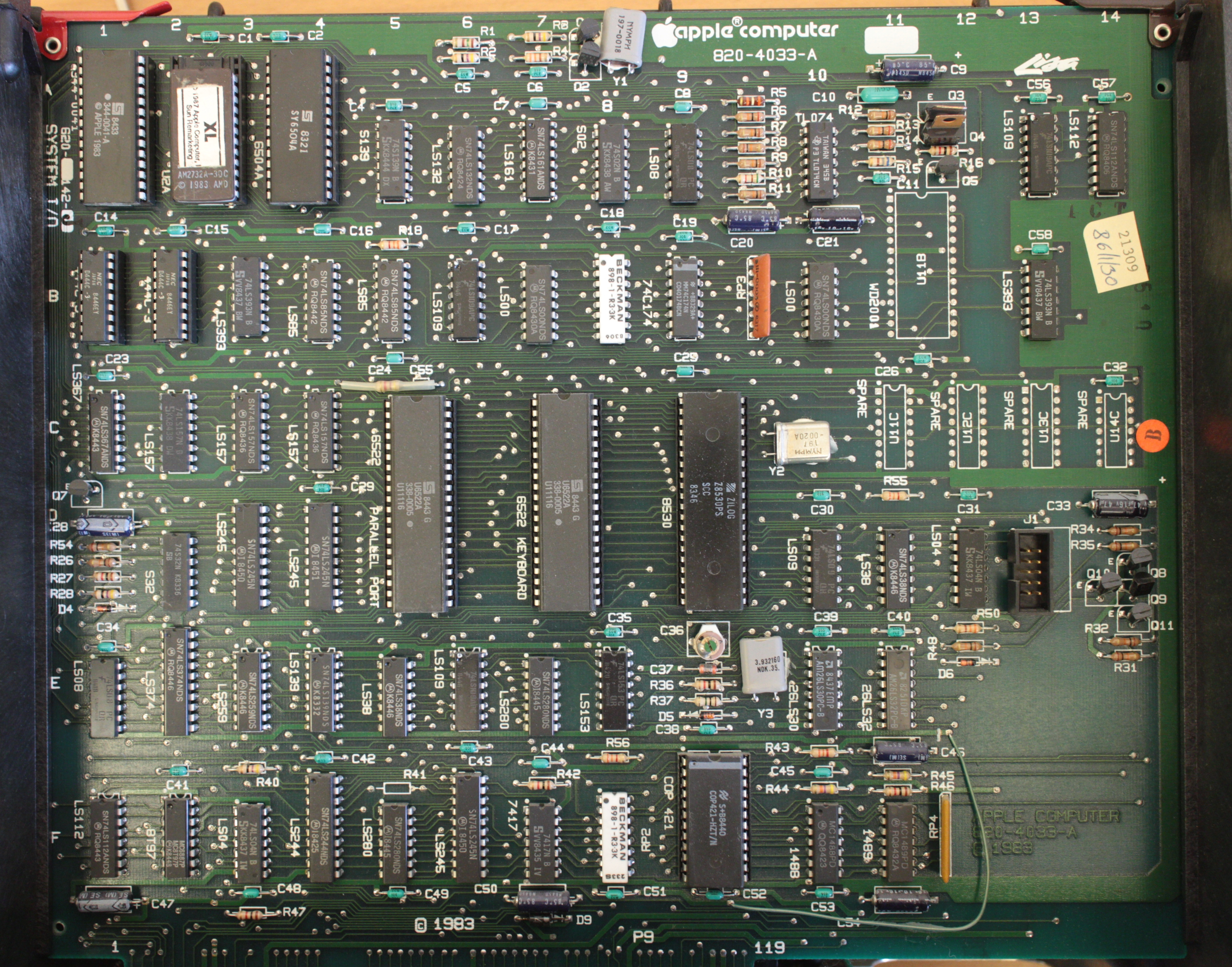
Apple Lisa I/O board. COP421 is the 24-pin chip at bottom. Click to enlarge.

- Apple Lisa utilized a COP421 to control the keyboard, mouse, RTC, and soft power switch. A second COP421 controls the spindle motor of the Widget hard disk drive.
- Several manufacturers used COP400 in their early electronic games:
  - COP410 and COP411, 512 byte ROM, 32 x 4 RAM: Mattel's Funtronics Jacks, Red Light Green Light, Tag, and Plus One.
  - COP420 and COP421, 1024 byte ROM, 64 x 4 RAM: Milton Bradley Lightfight and Electronic Battleship 1982. Castle Toy Company Einstein. Coleco Head to Head Basketball. National Semiconductor Quiz Kid Racer. LJN Toys Ltd I Took a Lickin' from a Chicken.
  - COP444, 2048 byte ROM, 128 x 4 RAM: Entex Space Invader. Mattel Dalla$, Texas Instruments My Little Computer.
- Western Digital used a WD4200 (COP420) as the basis for their WD2412 time-of-day clock.
- The Grundy Newbrain computer uses a COP420 to manage its keyboard, tape I/O, and its built-in 16 character VF alphanumeric display.
- Philips Consumer Electronics used a COP420 for FM-AM-LW digital PLL synthesizer tuner with search tuning and presets.
- The Yoko Excel-O-Tone is a toy music synthesizer that uses a COP420.

== Intellectual property ==
T400 μController is an open source implementation of the COP400 microcontroller written in VHDL. COP420/421 and COP410L/411L devices are supported. T400 is intended to be a replacement for the original chip in SOCs recreating legacy systems. T400 has been implemented in several FPGA families. T400 is available under GNU General Public License.

== Emulator ==
There is an open-source MAME emulator for the COP400 family and several hand held games and specialty calculators.

== See also ==
- National Semiconductor COP8
- American Microsystems S2000, a microcontroller with a similar instruction set
