= COP8 =

8-bit microcontroller

National Semiconductor COP8
General information
- Launched: 1988; 38 years ago
- Common manufacturer: National Semiconductor

Performance
- Max. CPU clock rate: 0 Hz to 2 MHz
- Data width: 8 (RAM), 8 (ROM)
- Address width: 8 (RAM), 15 (ROM)

Physical specifications
- Package: 20, 28, and 40-pin DIP; 16, 20, and 28 pin SOIC; 44-pin PLCC

Architecture and classification
- Application: Embedded
- Instruction set: COP8
- Number of instructions: 69

History
- Predecessor: COP400
- Successor: none

The National Semiconductor COP8 is an 8-bit CISC core microcontroller. COP8 is an enhancement to the earlier COP400 4-bit microcontroller family. COP8 main features are:

- Large amount of I/O pins
- Up to 32 KB of Flash memory/ROM for code and data
- Very low EMI
- Many integrated peripherals (meant as single chip design)
- In-System Programming
- Free assembler toolchain. Commercial C compilers available
- Free Multitasking OS and TCP/IP stack
- Peak of 2 million instructions per second

The COP8 has a basic instruction cycle time 1/10 of the clock frequency; a maximum 10 MHz clock will result in a maximum 1 MHz instruction execution rate. (The 10 MHz clock is used directly by some timer peripherals.) The maximum instruction execution rate is 1 cycle per byte, and most 1-byte instructions operate in one instruction cycle. Some, particularly branch instructions, take one or two cycles more. Some models include a clock doubler, and although they still accept a maximum 10 MHz input clock, they internally double it to a 20 MHz master clock which then results in a 2 MHz instruction execution rate.

The chip is a static logic design which can tolerate an arbitrarily slow clock; most models include a second 32768 Hz quartz clock crystal oscillator which can be used for the CPU clock while the high-speed clock is disabled to save power.

== Registers and memory map ==
COP8 registers
Main registers
								A								Accumulator
	PCU							PCL								Program Counter
^{1}_{5}	^{1}_{4}	^{1}_{3}	^{1}_{2}	^{1}_{1}	^{1}_{0}	^{0}_{9}	^{0}_{8}	^{0}_{7}	^{0}_{6}	^{0}_{5}	^{0}_{4}	^{0}_{3}	^{0}_{2}	^{0}_{1}	^{0}_{0}	(bit position)
Note: All other programmer-visible registers and status bits are allocated in RAM.

The COP8 uses separate instruction and data spaces (Harvard architecture). Instruction address space is 15-bit (32 KiB maximum), while data addresses are 8-bit (256 bytes maximum, extended via bank-switching).

To allow software bugs to be caught, all invalid instruction addresses read as zero, which is a trap instruction. Invalid RAM above the stack reads as all-ones, which is an invalid address.

The CPU has an 8-bit accumulator and 15-bit program counter. 16 additional 8-bit registers (R0–R15) and an 8-bit program status word are memory mapped. There are special instructions to access them, but general RAM access instructions may also be used.

The memory map is divided into half RAM and half control registers as follows:

COP8 data address space
Addresses	Use
0x00–6F	General purpose RAM, used for stack
0x70–7F	Unused, reads as all-ones (0xFF) to trap stack underflows
0x80–8F	Unused, reads undefined
0x90–BF	Additional peripheral control registers
0xC0–CF	Peripheral control registers.
0xD0–DF	General purpose I/O ports L, G, I, C and D
0xE0–E8	Reserved
0xE9	Microwire shift register
0xEA–ED	Timer 1 registers
0xEE	CNTRL register, control bits for Microwire & Timer 1
0xEF	PSW, CPU program status word
0xF0–FB	R0–R11, on-chip RAM mapped as registers
0xFC	R12, a.k.a. X, secondary indirect pointer register
0xFD	R13, a.k.a. SP, stack pointer register
0xFE	R14, a.k.a. B, primary indirect pointer register
0xFF	R15, a.k.a. S, data segment extension register

If RAM is not banked, then R15 (S) is just another general-purpose register. If RAM is banked, then the low half of the data address space (addresses 0x00–7F) is directed to a RAM bank selected by S. The special purpose registers in the high half of the data address space are always visible. The data registers at 0xFx can be used to copy data between banks.

RAM banks other than bank 0 have all 128 bytes available. The stack (addressed via the stack pointer) is always on bank 0, no matter how the S register is set.

== Control transfers ==
In addition to 3-byte JMPL and JSRL instructions which can address the entire address space, 2-byte versions of these instructions, JMP and JSR, can jump within a 4K page. The instruction specifies the low 12 bits, and the high 3 bits of the PC are preserved. (These are intended primarily for models with up to 4K of ROM.) For short-distance branches, there are 63 1-byte instructions, JP, which perform PC-relative branches from PC−32 to PC+31. This is a 15-bit addition, and no page boundary requirements apply.

There are also jump indirect and load accumulator indirect instructions which use the accumulator contents as the low 8 bits of an address; the high 7 bits of the current PC are preserved.

Conditional branches per se do not exist, nor does the processor provide the traditional ZCVN status flags, although the program status word contains carry and half-carry flags for multi-byte arithmetic. Rather, there are a number of compare-and-skip instructions. For example, IFEQ compares its two operands, and skips the following instruction if they are unequal. Any instruction may be skipped; it is not limited to branches.

An interesting extension of this mechanism is the RETSK return-and-skip instruction, which lets any subroutine conditionally skip the instruction following the call. This provides a very compact way to return a boolean value from a subroutine.

Another feature unique to the COP8 architecture is the IFBNE instruction. This one-byte instruction compares the low 4 bits of the B (memory pointer) register with a 4-bit immediate constant, and can be used to loop until B has reached the end of a small (up to 16 byte) buffer. There is also a one-byte LD B,#imm4 instruction.

== Instruction set ==
COP8 operands are listed in destination, source order. Most instructions have the accumulator A as one of the operands. The other operand is generally chosen from an 8-bit immediate value, an 8-bit RAM address, or [B], the RAM address selected by the B register. The LD and X (exchange with accumulator) instructions also support RAM addressing by the X register ([X]) and post-inc/decrement variants ([B+], [B−], [X+], [X−]).

Indirect addressing via B is particularly fast, and can be done in the same cycle that the instruction is executed; even X A,[B] is a one-cycle instruction.

On the other hand, absolute RAM addressing is only directly encoded for five instructions: LD A,addr8, X A,addr8, LD addr8,#imm8, IFEQ addr8,#imm8, and DIR addr8. The latter is a "direct addressing" opcode prefix which may be prepended to any instruction with a [B] operand, and changes the operand to the specified memory location. (Conditional-skip instructions skip the prefix and following instruction as a pair.) Using DIR with the LD A,[B], X A,[B] and LD [B],#imm8 instructions is not documented, as the dedicated instructions are more efficient.

All "move" instructions are called LD (load) even if the destination is a memory address (LD addr8,#imm8). Unusually, there are no LD instructions with the accumulator as a source; stores must be done with the X instruction which exchanges the accumulator with the memory operand, storing A and loading the previous memory contents.

There are instructions to fetch from tables in ROM. These combine the high 7 bits of the program counter (PCU) with the accumulator, fetch a byte from that address, and place it in the accumulator (LAID instruction) or the low 8 bits of the program counter PCL (JID instruction). Because the next instruction executed must be in the same 256-byte page of ROM as the table itself, a 256-entry table is not possible.

COP8 family instruction set
Opcode								Operands		Mnemonic	Cycles	Description
7	6	5	4	3	2	1	0	b2	b3	Mnemonic	Cycles	Description
0	0	0	0	0	0	0	0	—	—	INTR	7	Software interrupt (push PC, PC ← 0x00ff)
0	0	0	offset					—	—	JP +disp5	3	PC ← PC + offset; jump 1–31 bytes forward (offset≠0)
0	0	1	0	high				low	—	JMP addr12	3	PC[11:0] ← addr. Top 3 bits of PC preserved.
0	0	1	1	high				low	—	JSR addr12	5	Jump to subroutine: push PC, proceed as JMP.
0	1	0	0	k				—	—	IFBNE #imm4	1	Skip next instruction if (B & 15) = k.
0	1	0	1	k				—	—	LD B,#imm4	1	B ← 15 − k (zero-extended)
0	1	1	0	0	opcode				—	Miscellaneous instructions		
0	1	1	0	0	0	0	0	k	—	ANDSZ A,#imm8 (Note: Only on "feature family" (COP888/COP8SA) cores; not present on "basic family" (COP800) cores.)	2	Skip if A & k = 0 (=IFBIT #bit,A)
0	1	1	0	0	0	0	1	addr	—	JSRB addr8 (Note: Only on "flash family" (COP8TA/COP8C) models with boot ROM for in-system programming.)	5	Push PC, jump to boot ROM subroutine at address
0	1	1	0	0	0	1	–	—	—	(reserved for boot ROM)		
0	1	1	0	0	1	0	0	—	—	CLR A	1	A ← 0
0	1	1	0	0	1	0	1	—	—	SWAP A	1	A ← A<<4 | A>>4; swap nibbles
0	1	1	0	0	1	1	0	—	—	DCOR A	1	Decimal correct after BCD addition
0	1	1	0	0	1	1	1	—	—	PUSH A	3	[SP] ← A, SP ← SP−1
0	1	1	opc		bit			—	—	Bit operations on [B] (Note: Operand may be changed from [B] to 8-bit absolute address with a DIR prefix (+2 bytes, +3 cycles).)		
0	1	1	0	1	bit			—	—	RBIT #bit,[B]	1	Reset (clear to 0) given bit of RAM
0	1	1	1	0	bit			—	—	IFBIT #bit,[B]	1	Test given bit of RAM, skip if zero
0	1	1	1	1	bit			—	—	SBIT #bit,[B]	1	Set (to 1) given bit of RAM
1	0	0	m	0	opcode			k?	—	Binary operations, A ← A op operand		
1	0	0	0	0	opcode			—	—	OP A,[B]	1	A ← A op [B]
1	0	0	1	0	opcode			k	—	OP A,#imm8	2	A ← A op k
1	0	0	m	0	0	0	0	k?	—	ADC A,operand		C,A ← A + operand + C; add with carry
1	0	0	m	0	0	0	1	k?	—	SUBC A,operand		C,A ← A + ~operand + C (A − operand − ~C)
1	0	0	m	0	0	1	0	k?	—	IFEQ A,operand		Skip if A ≠ operand
1	0	0	m	0	0	1	1	k?	—	IFGT A,operand		Skip if A ≤ operand
1	0	0	m	0	1	0	0	k?	—	ADD A,operand		A ← A + operand (carry unchanged!)
1	0	0	m	0	1	0	1	k?	—	AND A,operand		A ← A & operand
1	0	0	m	0	1	1	0	k?	—	XOR A,operand		A ← A ^ operand
1	0	0	m	0	1	1	1	k?	—	OR A,operand		A ← A | operand
1	0	0	0	1	opcode			—	—	Zero-operand instructions		
1	0	0	0	1	0	0	0	—	—	IFC	1	Skip if carry clear
1	0	0	0	1	0	0	1	—	—	IFNC	1	Skip if carry set
1	0	0	0	1	0	1	0	—	—	INC A	1	A ← A + 1 (carry unchanged)
1	0	0	0	1	0	1	1	—	—	DEC A	1	A ← A − 1 (carry unchanged)
1	0	0	0	1	1	0	0	—	—	POP A	3	SP ← SP+1, A ← [SP]
1	0	0	0	1	1	0	1	—	—	RETSK	5	Pop PC, skip one instruction
1	0	0	0	1	1	1	0	—	—	RET	5	Pop PC high, pop PC low
1	0	0	0	1	1	1	1	—	—	RETI	5	Return and enable interrupts
1	0	0	1	1	opcode			k	—	Instructions with immediate operand		
1	0	0	1	1	0	0	0	k	—	LD A,#imm8	2	A ← k
1	0	0	1	1	0	0	1	k	—	IFNE A,#imm8	2	Skip if A = k
1	0	0	1	1	0	1	0	k	—	LD [B+],#imm8	3	[B] ← k, B ← B + 1
1	0	0	1	1	0	1	1	k	—	LD [B−],#imm8	3	[B] ← k, B ← B − 1
1	0	0	1	1	1	0	0	addr	—	X A,addr8	3	A ↔ [addr], exchange
1	0	0	1	1	1	0	1	addr	—	LD A,addr8	3	A ← [addr]
1	0	0	1	1	1	1	0	k	—	LD [B],#imm8	2	[B] ← k
1	0	0	1	1	1	1	1	k	—	LD B,#imm8	2	B ← k (=LD R14,#k, one cycle faster)
1	0	1	opcode			0	c			Miscellaneous instructions		
1	0	1	0	0	0	0	0	—	—	RC	1	C ← 0; reset carry to 0
1	0	1	0	0	0	0	1	—	—	SC	1	C ← 1; set carry to 1
1	0	1	0	0	1	0	0	—	—	LAID	3	A ← ROM[PCU:A]; load from ROM
1	0	1	0	0	1	0	1	—	—	JID	3	PCL ← ROM[PCU:A]; jump via ROM table
1	0	1	0	1	0	0	0	—	—	RLC A	1	C,A ← A,C; rotate left through carry (=ADC A,A)
1	0	1	0	1	0	0	1	addr	k	IFEQ addr8,#imm8	3	Skip if [addr] ≠ k
1	0	1	0	1	1	0	0	high	low	JMPL addr15	4	PC ← address
1	0	1	0	1	1	0	1	high	low	JSRL addr15	5	Push PC, PC ← address
1	0	1	1	0	0	0	0	—	—	RRC A	1	A,C ← C,A; rotate right through carry
1	0	1	1	0	0	0	1	—	—	(reserved)		
1	0	1	1	0	1	0	0	—	—	VIS	5	PC ← ROM[vector table]; Vector Interrupt Select
1	0	1	1	0	1	0	1	—	—	RPND	1	Reset pending interrupt flag
1	0	1	1	1	0	0	0	—	—	NOP	1	No operation
1	0	1	1	1	0	0	1	—	—	IFNE A,[B]	1	Skip if A = [B]
1	0	1	1	1	1	0	0	addr	k	LD addr8,#imm8	3	[addr] ← k
1	0	1	1	1	1	0	1	addr	—	DIR addr8	3	Change next instruction's operand from [B] to [addr]
1	0	1	R	L	=	1	±	—	—	Load/exchange operations		
1	0	1	0	0	0	1	0	—	—	X A,[B+]	2	A ↔ [B], B ← B+1
1	0	1	0	0	0	1	1	—	—	X A,[B−]	2	A ↔ [B], B ← B−1
1	0	1	0	0	1	1	0	—	—	X A,[B]	1	A ↔ [B]
1	0	1	0	1	0	1	0	—	—	LD A,[B+]	2	A ← [B], B ← B+1
1	0	1	0	1	0	1	1	—	—	LD A,[B−]	2	A ← [B], B ← B−1
1	0	1	0	1	1	1	0	—	—	LD A,[B]	1	A ← [B]
1	0	1	1	0	0	1	0	—	—	X A,[X+]	3	A ↔ [X], X ← X+1
1	0	1	1	0	0	1	1	—	—	X A,[X−]	3	A ↔ [X], X ← X−1
1	0	1	1	0	1	1	0	—	—	X A,[X]	3	A ↔ [X]
1	0	1	1	1	0	1	0	—	—	LD A,[X+]	3	A ← [X], X ← X+1
1	0	1	1	1	0	1	1	—	—	LD A,[X−]	3	A ← [X], X ← X−1
1	0	1	1	1	1	1	0	—	—	LD A,[X]	3	A ← [X]
1	0	1	—		1	1	1	—	—	(reserved)		
1	1	0	0	register				—	—	DRSZ register	3	register ← register − 1, skip if result is zero
1	1	0	1	register				k	—	LD register,#imm8	3	register ← k (=LD 0xf0+register,#k, one byte shorter)
1	1	1	offset					—	—	JP −disp5	3	PC ← PC − 32 + offset; jump 1–32 bytes backward
7	6	5	4	3	2	1	0	b2	b3	Mnemonic	Cycles	Description

== Notable uses ==
- The COP8 family is employed in the FMU-139 aerial bomb fuze
- The COP822 is employed in the M732A2 artillery fuze
