= Hardware bug =

Engineering flaw in a manufactured device

A hardware bug is a bug in computer hardware. It is the hardware counterpart of software bug, a defect in software. A bug is different from a glitch which describes an undesirable behavior as more quick, transient and repeated than constant, and different from a quirk which is a behavior that may be considered useful even though not intentionally designed.

Errata, corrections to the documentation, may be published by the manufacturer to describe hardware bugs, and errata is sometimes used as a term for the bugs themselves.

== Unintended operation ==
Sometimes users take advantage of the unintended or undocumented operation of hardware to serve some purpose, in which case a flaw may be considered a feature. This gives rise to the often ironically employed acronym INABIAF, "It's Not A Bug It's A Feature". For example, undocumented instructions, known as illegal opcodes, on the MOS Technology 6510 of the Commodore 64 and MOS Technology 6502 of the Apple II computers are sometimes utilized.

== Security vulnerabilities ==
Some flaws in hardware may lead to security vulnerabilities where memory protection or other features fail to work properly. Starting in 2017 a series of security vulnerabilities were found in the implementations of speculative execution on common processor architectures that allowed a violation of privilege level.

In 2019 researchers discovered that a manufacturer debugging mode, known as VISA, had an undocumented feature on Intel Platform Controller Hubs, known as chipsets, which made the mode accessible with a normal motherboard possibly leading to a security vulnerability.

== Pentium bugs ==
The Intel Pentium series of CPUs had two well-known bugs discovered after it was brought to market, the FDIV bug affecting floating point division which resulted in a recall in 1994, and the F00F bug discovered in 1997 which causes the processor to stop operating until rebooted.
