= Brutus (disambiguation) =

Brutus is a Latin surname, which usually refers to Marcus Junius Brutus (85–42 BC), one of the assassins of the Roman dictator Julius Caesar.

Brutus may also refer to:

== People ==
=== Romans ===
- Lucius Junius Brutus, putative founder of the Roman Republic
- Marcus Junius Brutus (tribune 83 BC), father of the homonymous tyrannicide
- Marcus Junius Brutus, Julius Caesar's most famous assassin, usually the one referred to in literature and art
- Decimus Junius Brutus Albinus, another of Caesar's assassins
- Junius Brutus (disambiguation), others with similar names

=== People with the surname ===
- Dennis Brutus (1924–2009), South African poet
- Duly Brutus, Haitian politician
- Joel Brutus (born 1974), Haitian judoka

=== Other people ===
- Brutus of Troy, legendary founder of Britain
- Brutus Greenshield, Brutus II
- Brutus (Antifederalist), author of several Anti-Federalist Papers
- Brutus Babington, 1558–1611, Irish bishop
- Brutus Beefcake, stage name of professional wrestler Edward Leslie
- Brutus (rapper), Dutch rapper
- Junius Brutus, pseudonym of Charles Blount (deist) (1654–1693)
- Brutus, pseudonym of Lucien Bonaparte during the French Revolution
- Roman Czerniawski or Brutus (1910–1985), World War II double agent

== Fictional characters ==
- Bluto or Brutus, a cartoon character from "Popeye"
- Brutus, a character in Anima: Age of the Robots
- Brutus, an unlockable character in the Chapter 2, Season 2 Battle Pass in Fortnite Battle Royale
- Brutus, a character in Human Killing Machine
- Brutus, a character in The Hunger Games
- Brutus, a character in Race for Your Life, Charlie Brown
- Brutus, a character in The Rescuers
- Brutus, an anthropomorphic guard rat in The Secret of NIMH

== Places ==
- Brutus, Łódź Voivodeship, in central Poland
- Brutus, Michigan, unincorporated community in Emmet County, Michigan, United States
- Brutus, New York, a town in Cayuga County, New York, United States

== Music ==
- Brutus (Canadian band), a 1970s Canadian band
- Brutus (Czech band), a Czech rock band
- Brutus (Norwegian band), a Norwegian blues rock band
  - Brutus (album), a 2010 album by the Norwegian band
- Brutus (Belgian band), a Belgian post-hardcore band
- "Brutus", a song by Em Beihold, 2025

== Transportation ==
- Brutus (car), an aero-engined car
- Texan schooner Brutus, a ship in the Texas Navy
- Brutus, a South Devon Railway Dido-class steam locomotives

== Other uses ==
- Brutus (1911 film), an Italian film
- Brutus (2016 film)
- Brutus (Cicero), an oratory by Cicero
- Brutus (magazine), a Japanese magazine
- Brutus (play), an 1818 play by John Howard Payne
- Brutus (sculpture), a sculpture by Michelangelo
- Brutus (tragedy), a 1730 play by Voltaire
- Brutus, or The Lictors Bring to Brutus the Bodies of His Sons, a painting by Jacques-Louis David
- Brutus, a character in Shakespeare's Julius Caesar
- Brutus, or The Fall of Tarquin, a play by John Howard Payne
- Brutus, a Shell oil drilling rig that leaked oil in the Gulf of Mexico in 2016

== See also ==
- Brutus Buckeye, the athletics mascot of Ohio State University
- Brutus cluster, a high-performance cluster at ETH Zurich
- Brutus Jeans, maker of denim apparel in the 1970s and '80s
