= ABCI =

ABCI or ABCi may refer to:

- Aden Bowman Collegiate
- Association of Baptist Churches in Ireland
- Association of Baptist Churches in Israel
- AI Bridging Cloud Infrastructure, a Japanese supercomputer under development
- Australian Bureau of Criminal Intelligence, precursor of the Australian Criminal Intelligence Commission
