= UniDIMM =

Specification for DIMMs

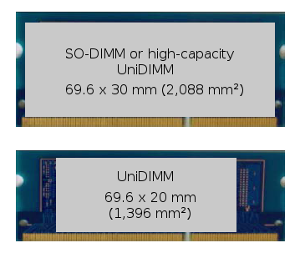
A comparison of the standard (top) and low-profile UniDIMM version (bottom). The standard UniDIMM version has the same dimensions as DDR4 SO-DIMMs.

UniDIMM (short for Universal DIMM) is a specification for dual in-line memory modules (DIMMs), which are printed circuit boards (PCBs) designed to carry dynamic random-access memory (DRAM) chips. UniDIMMs can be populated with either DDR3 or DDR4 chips, with no support for any additional memory control logic; as a result, the computer's memory controller must support both DDR3 and DDR4 memory standards. The UniDIMM specification was created by Intel for its Skylake microarchitecture, whose integrated memory controller (IMC) supports both DDR3 (more specifically, the DDR3L low-voltage variant) and DDR4 memory technologies.

UniDIMM is a SO-DIMM form factor available in two dimensions: 69.6 mm × 30 mm (2.74 by 1.18 inches) for the standard UniDIMM version (the same size as DDR4 SO-DIMMs), and 69.6 mm × 20 mm (2.74 by 0.79 inches) for the low-profile version. UniDIMMs have a 260-pin edge connector, which has the same pin count as the one on DDR4 SO-DIMMs, with the keying notch in a position that prevents incompatible installation by making UniDIMMs physically incompatible with standard DDR3 and DDR4 SO-DIMM sockets. Because of the lower operating voltage of DDR4 chips (1.2 V) compared with the operating voltage of DDR3 chips (1.5 V for regular DDR3 and 1.35 V for low-voltage DDR3L), UniDIMMs are designed to contain additional built-in voltage regulation circuitry.

The UniDIMM specification was created to ease the market transition from DDR3 to DDR4 SDRAM. In previous RAM standard transitions, as it was the case when DDR2 was phased out in favor of DDR3, having an emerging RAM standard as a new product line created a "chicken-and-egg" problem because its manufacturing is initially more expensive, yields low demand, and results in low production rates. The DDR2 to DDR3 transition issues were sometimes handled with specific motherboards that provided separate slots for DDR2 and DDR3 modules, out of which only one kind could be used. By its design, the UniDIMM specification allows either DDR3 or DDR4 memory to be used in the same memory module slots, resulting in no wasted motherboard space that would otherwise be occupied by unused slots.

As of April 2018, UniDIMM is not standardized by JEDEC, having Kingston and Micron as its main supporters. Despite the availability of UniDIMM specification and announced manufacturer support, as of April 2018 there are no commercial UniDIMM products available and no release dates have been set by the manufacturers. As DDR3 has become more irrelevant after years of DDR4 availability, it is looking increasingly unlikely that manufacturers will ever implement UniDIMM.

== See also ==
- Centaur (computing) – POWER8's external memory controller that makes POWER8 independent of the actual memory technology
- Memory geometry – describes the logical configuration of RAM modules, including channels, ranks and banks
