= Brutus (album) =

Studio album by Brutus
- Released: 16 April 2010
- Genre: Hard rock, psychedelic rock, doom rock, blues rock
- Length: 44:00
- Label: Svart Records; Transubstans records
- Producer: Brutus, Henryk Lipp

Brutus chronology
Brutus (2010)	Behind the Mountains (2013)

Brutus is the first full-length studio album by Norwegian hard rock, heavy blues rock band Brutus. It was released on 16 April 2010. It came in two versions: digipak CD (Transubstans Records) and vinyl LP, released by Svart Records. The album received good reviews and critical acclaim.

== Track listing ==
- All songs written by Brutus.
1. "Hypnotized" - 5:25
2. "Solution" - 4:44
3. "Feel Free" - 4:44
4. "Hey Mama" - 4:32
5. "(The) Golden Town" - 5:35
6. "Spirit of Time" - 7:25
7. "Swedish Lady" - 4:28
8. "Swamp City Blues" - 7:31
9. "Stagnant Pool" (Leaf Hound cover) LP version only bonus track) - 3:46

== Personnel ==
=== Brutus ===
- Karl Johan Forsberg: Guitars
- Kim Molander: Guitars
- Christian "Krille" Hellqvist: Bass
- Nils Joakim Stenby: Vocals
- Knut-Ole Mathisen: Drums, Percussion

=== Additional musicians ===
- Henryk Lipp: Piano
- Axel Lennart Söderberg: Backing vocals
