= Junius Brutus =

Junius Brutus may refer to:

- Decimus Junius Brutus (disambiguation)
- Marcus Junius Brutus, assassin of Julius Caesar
- Marcus Junius Brutus (tribune 83 BC), father of preceding
- Lucius Junius Brutus, legendary founder of the Roman Republic
- Lucius Junius Brutus Damasippus
- Junius Brutus Booth, father of John Wilkes Booth, assassin of US President Abraham Lincoln

== See also ==
- Gaius Junius Bubulcus Brutus, Roman consul in 317 and 311 BC
- Junia gens
