= Whiskey Lake =

Intel microprocessor, released in 2018

General information
- Launched: August 28, 2018; 7 years ago
- Product code: 80684

Performance
- Max. CPU clock rate: 4.8 GHz

Physical specifications
- Cores: 2–4
- Socket: BGA1528

Cache
- L1 cache: 64 KB per core
- L2 cache: 256 KB per core
- L3 cache: Up to 8 MB, shared

Architecture and classification
- Technology node: 14 nm (Tri-Gate) transistors
- Microarchitecture: Skylake
- Instruction set: x86-16, IA-32, x86-64
- Extensions: MMX, AES-NI, CLMUL, FMA3, RDRAND; SSE, SSE2, SSE3, SSSE3, SSE4.1, SSE4.2; AVX, AVX2, TXT, TSX, SGX; VT-x, VT-d

Products, models, variants
- Brand name: Celeron; Pentium; Core i3; Core i5; Core i7

History
- Predecessor: Mobile: Kaby Lake Refresh (2nd optimization)
- Successors: Ice Lake (Architecture); Comet Lake (4th optimization)

Support status
- Legacy support for iGPU

Whiskey Lake is Intel's codename for a family of third-generation 14nm Skylake low-power mobile processors. Intel announced Whiskey Lake on August 28, 2018.

== Changes ==
- 14++ nm process, same as Coffee Lake
- Increased turbo clocks (300–600 MHz)
- 14 nm PCH
- Native USB 3.1 gen 2 support (10 Gbit/s)
- Integrated Wi-Fi 802.11ac 160 MHz / WiFi 5 and Bluetooth 5.0
- Intel Optane Memory support

== List of Whiskey Lake CPUs ==
=== Mobile processors ===
The TDP for these CPUs is 15 W, but is configurable.

Core i5-8365U and i7-8665U support Intel vPro Technology.

Pentium Gold and Celeron CPUs lack AVX2 support.

Processor branding	Model	Cores (threads)	CPU clock rate (GHz)	Turbo clock (GHz) Num of cores			GPU	Max GPU clock rate	L3 cache	cTDP		Memory	Price
Processor branding	Model	Cores (threads)	CPU clock rate (GHz)	1	2	4	GPU	Max GPU clock rate	L3 cache	Up	Down	Memory	Price
Core i7	8665U	4 (8)	1.9	4.8	4.7	4.2	UHD; 620	1150 MHz	8 MB	25 W	10 W	DDR4-2400 LPDDR3-2133	$409
Core i7	8565U	4 (8)	1.8	4.6	4.5	4.1	UHD; 620	1150 MHz	8 MB	25 W	10 W	DDR4-2400 LPDDR3-2133	$409
Core i5	8365U	4 (8)	1.6	4.1		3.8	UHD; 620	1100 MHz	6 MB	25 W	10 W	DDR4-2400 LPDDR3-2133	$297
Core i5	8265U	4 (8)	1.6	3.9		3.7	UHD; 620	1100 MHz	6 MB	25 W	10 W	DDR4-2400 LPDDR3-2133	$297
Core i3	8145U	2 (4)	2.1	3.9	3.7	—N/a	UHD; 620	1000 MHz	4 MB	25 W	10 W	DDR4-2400 LPDDR3-2133	$281
Pentium Gold	5405U	2 (4)	2.3	—N/a			UHD; 610	950 MHz	2 MB	—N/a	12.5 W	DDR4-2133 LPDDR3-1866	$161
Celeron	4205U	2 (2)	1.8	—N/a			UHD; 610	900 MHz	2 MB	—N/a	12.5 W	DDR4-2133 LPDDR3-1866	$107

Atom (ULV)		Node name	Pentium/Core						
Microarch.	Step	Node name	Microarch.	Step					
		600 nm	P6	Pentium Pro (133 MHz)					
		500 nm	P6	Pentium Pro (150 MHz)					
		350 nm	P6	Pentium Pro (166–200 MHz)					
		350 nm	P6	Klamath					
		250 nm	P6	Deschutes					
		250 nm	P6	Katmai	NetBurst				
		180 nm	P6	Coppermine	Willamette				
		130 nm	P6	Tualatin	Northwood				
		130 nm	Pentium M	Banias	Northwood		NetBurst(HT)		NetBurst(×2)
		90 nm	Pentium M	Dothan	Prescott	⇨	Prescott‑2M	⇨	Smithfield
		90 nm	Pentium M	Dothan	~~Tejas~~	→	⇩	→	~~Cedarmill (Tejas)~~
		65 nm	Pentium M	Yonah	~~Nehalem (NetBurst)~~		Cedar Mill	⇨	Presler
		65 nm	Core	Merom	4 cores on mainstream desktop, DDR3 introduced				
Bonnell	Bonnell	45 nm	Core	Penryn					
Bonnell	Bonnell	45 nm	Nehalem	Nehalem	HT reintroduced, integrated MC, PCH; L3-cache introduced, 256 KB L2-cache/core				
Bonnell	Saltwell	32 nm	Nehalem	Westmere	Introduced GPU on same package and AES-NI				
Bonnell	Saltwell	32 nm	Sandy Bridge	Sandy Bridge	On-die ring bus, no more non-UEFI motherboards				
Silvermont	Silvermont	22 nm	Sandy Bridge	Ivy Bridge					
Silvermont	Silvermont	22 nm	Haswell	Haswell	Fully integrated voltage regulator				
Silvermont	Airmont	14 nm	Haswell	Broadwell					
Silvermont	Airmont	14 nm	Skylake	Skylake	DDR4 introduced on mainstream desktop				
Goldmont		14 nm	Skylake	Kaby Lake					
Goldmont		14 nm	Skylake	Coffee Lake	6 cores on mainstream desktop				
Goldmont		14 nm	Skylake	Amber Lake	Mobile-only				
Goldmont Plus		14 nm	Skylake	Whiskey Lake	Mobile-only				
Goldmont Plus		14 nm	Skylake	Coffee Lake Refresh	8 cores on mainstream desktop				
Goldmont Plus		14 nm	Skylake	Comet Lake	10 cores on mainstream desktop				
Goldmont Plus		14 nm	Sunny Cove	Cypress Cove (Rocket Lake)	Backported Sunny Cove microarchitecture for 14 nm				
Tremont		10 nm	Skylake	Palm Cove (Cannon Lake)	Mobile-only				
Tremont		10 nm	Sunny Cove	Sunny Cove (Ice Lake)	512 KB L2-cache/core				
Tremont		10 nm	Sunny Cove	Willow Cove (Tiger Lake)	X^{e} graphics engine				
Gracemont		Intel 7 (10 nm ESF)	Golden Cove	Golden Cove (Alder Lake)	Hybrid, DDR5, PCIe 5.0				
Gracemont		Intel 7 (10 nm ESF)	Golden Cove	Raptor Cove (Raptor Lake)					
Crestmont		Intel 4	Redwood Cove	Meteor Lake	Mobile-only; NPU, chiplet architecture				
Crestmont		Intel 3	Redwood Cove	Arrow Lake-U					
Skymont		TSMC N3B	Lion Cove	Lunar Lake	Low power mobile only (9–30 W)				
Skymont		TSMC N3B	Lion Cove	Arrow Lake					
Darkmont		Intel 18A	Cougar Cove	Panther Lake					
Arctic Wolf		Intel 18A and/or TSMC N2P	Coyote Cove	Nova Lake					
