= Skylake (microarchitecture) =

CPU microarchitecture by Intel

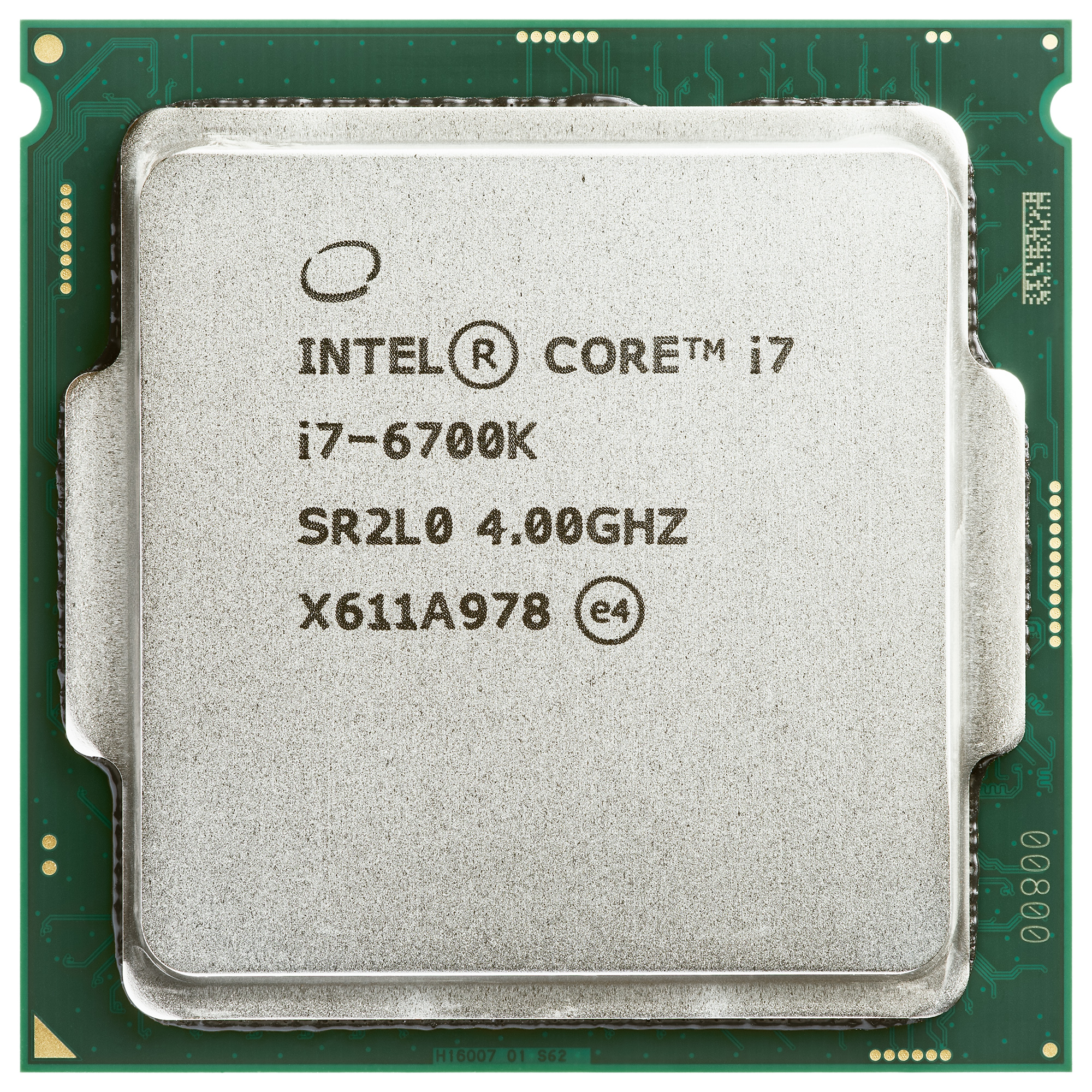
- Intel Core i7-6700K with four physical cores

General information
- Launched: August 5, 2015; 11 years ago
- Discontinued: March 4, 2019; 7 years ago (desktop processors)
- Marketed by: Intel
- Designed by: Intel
- Common manufacturer: Intel
- CPUID code: 0406e3h, 0506e3h
- Product code: 80662 (mainstream and mobile Xeon E3); 80673 (enthusiast and server)

Performance
- Max. CPU clock rate: Up to 5.0 GHz

Physical specifications
- Cores: 2–28
- Sockets: Desktop; LGA 1151; LGA 2066; Server & Workstation; LGA 3647; LGA 2066; Mobile; BGA 1168; BGA 1356; BGA 1515; BGA 1440

Cache
- L1 cache: 64 KB per core (32 KB instructions + 32 KB data)
- L2 cache: 256 KB per core (1 MB per core for Skylake-X, SP, and W)
- L3 cache: Up to 38.5 MB shared
- L4 cache: 128 MB of eDRAM (on Iris Pro models)

Architecture and classification
- Technology node: 14 nm bulk silicon 3D transistors (Tri-Gate)
- Microarchitecture: Skylake
- Instruction set: x86-16, IA-32, x86-64
- Extensions: AES-NI, CLMUL, RDRAND, MPX, TXT, SGX; MMX, SSE, SSE2, SSE3, SSSE3, SSE4, SSE4.1, SSE4.2, ADX; AVX, AVX2, AVX-512 (Skylake-SP, Skylake-W & Skylake-X), TSX, FMA3; VT-x, VT-d

Products, models, variants
- Product code name: SKL
- Brand name: Core i3; Core i5; Core i7; Core i9; Core X-Series; Core m3; Core m5; Core m7; Xeon; Celeron; Pentium

History
- Predecessors: Haswell (tock) and Broadwell (tick/process)
- Successors: Kaby Lake (optimization, desktop, laptop, low-end server, and mobile workstation), Cascade Lake (HEDT, workstation, and mid- to high-end server) and Palm Cove (process)

Support status
- Client: Unsupported as of December 30, 2022 for iGPU; Xeon E3 v5: Unsupported as of December 30, 2022 for iGPU; Other Xeon: Supported

Skylake is Intel's codename for its sixth generation Core-branded microprocessor family that was launched on August 5, 2015, replacing the Haswell and Broadwell microarchitectures. Skylake is a microarchitecture redesign using the same 14 nm manufacturing process technology as its predecessor, serving as a tock in Intel's tick–tock manufacturing and design model. According to Intel, the redesign brings greater CPU and GPU performance and reduced power consumption. Skylake CPUs share their microarchitecture with Kaby Lake, Coffee Lake, Whiskey Lake, and Comet Lake CPUs.

Skylake is the last Intel platform on which Windows versions earlier than Windows 10 are officially supported by Microsoft, although enthusiast-created modifications are available that disabled the Windows Update check and allowed Windows 8.1 and earlier to continue to receive Windows Updates on this and later platforms.

Some of the processors based on the Skylake microarchitecture are marketed as sixth-generation Core.

Intel officially declared end of life and discontinued Skylake LGA 1151 CPUs (except i3-6100, i5-6500, and Xeon E3 v5) on March 4, 2019.

== Development history ==
Skylake's development, as with previous processors such as Banias, Dothan, Conroe, Sandy Bridge, and Ivy Bridge, was primarily undertaken by Intel Israel at its engineering research center in Haifa, Israel. The final design was largely an evolution of Haswell, with minor improvements to performance and several power-saving features being added. A major priority of Skylake's design was to design a microarchitecture for envelopes as low as 4.5W to embed within tablet computers and notebooks in addition to higher-power desktop computers and servers.

In September 2014, Intel announced the Skylake microarchitecture at the Intel Developer Forum in San Francisco, and that volume shipments of Skylake CPUs were scheduled for the second half of 2015. The Skylake development platform was announced to be available in Q1 2015. During the announcement, Intel also demonstrated two computers with desktop and mobile Skylake prototypes: the first was a desktop testbed system, running the latest version of 3DMark, while the second computer was a fully functional laptop, playing 4K video.

An initial batch of Skylake CPU models (i5-6600K and i7-6700K) was announced for immediate availability during the Gamescom on August 5, 2015, unusually soon after the release of its predecessor, Broadwell, which had suffered from launch delays. Intel acknowledged in 2014 that moving from 22 nm (Haswell) to 14 nm (Broadwell) had been its most difficult process to develop yet, causing Broadwell's planned launch to slip by several months; yet, the 14 nm production was back on track and in full production as of Q3 2014. Industry observers had initially believed that the issues affecting Broadwell would also cause Skylake to slip to 2016, but Intel was able to bring forward Skylake's release and shorten Broadwell's release cycle instead. As a result, the Broadwell architecture had an unusually short run.

== Overclocking of unsupported processors ==
Officially Intel supported overclocking of only the K and X versions of Skylake processors. However, it was later discovered that other non-K chips could be overclocked by modifying the base clock value – a process made feasible by the base clock applying only to the CPU, RAM, and integrated graphics on Skylake. Through beta UEFI firmware updates, some motherboard vendors, such as ASRock (which prominently promoted it under the name Sky OC) allowed the base clock to be modified in this manner.

When overclocking unsupported processors using these UEFI firmware updates, several issues arise:

- C-states are disabled, therefore the CPU will constantly run at its highest frequency and voltage
- Turbo-boost is disabled
- Integrated graphics are disabled
- AVX2 instruction performance is poor, approximately 4-5 times slower due to the upper 128-bit half of the execution units and data buses not being taken out of their power saving states
- CPU core temperature readings are incorrect

These issues are partly caused by the power management of the processor needing to be disabled for base clock overclocking to work.

In February 2016, however, an ASRock firmware update removed the feature. On February 9, 2016, Intel announced that it would no longer allow such overclocking of non-K processors, and that it had issued a CPU microcode update that removes the function. In April 2016, ASRock started selling motherboards that allow overclocking of unsupported CPUs using an external clock generator.

== Operating system support ==
In January 2016, Microsoft announced that it would end support of Windows 7 and Windows 8.1 on Skylake processors effective July 17, 2017; after this date, only the most critical updates for the two operating systems would be released for Skylake users if they have been judged not to affect the reliability of the OS on older hardware (until July 31, 2019; August 2019 critical update requires at least Windows 10), and Windows 10 would be the only Microsoft Windows platform officially supported on Skylake and on later Intel CPU microarchitectures beginning with Skylake's successor Kaby Lake. Terry Myerson stated that Microsoft had to make a large investment in order to reliably support Skylake on older versions of Windows, and that future generations of processors would require further investments. Microsoft also stated that due to the age of the platform, it would be challenging for newer hardware, firmware, and device driver combinations to properly run under Windows 7.

On March 18, 2016, in response to criticism over the move, primarily from enterprise customers, Microsoft announced revisions to the support policy, changing the cutoff for support and non-critical updates to July 17, 2018, and stating that Skylake users would receive all critical security updates for Windows 7 and 8.1 through the end of extended support. In August 2016, citing "a strong partnership with our OEM partners and Intel", Microsoft stated that it would continue to fully support 7 and 8.1 on Skylake through the end of their respective lifecycles. In addition, an enthusiast-created modification was released that disabled the Windows Update check and allowed Windows 8.1 and earlier to continue to be updated on this and later platforms.

As of Linux kernel 4.10, Skylake mobile power management is supported with most Package C states supported seeing some use. Linux 4.11 enables Frame-Buffer Compression for the integrated graphics chipset by default, which lowers power consumption.

Skylake is fully supported on OpenBSD 6.2 and later, including accelerated graphics.

For Windows 11, only the high-end Skylake-X processors are officially listed as compatible. All other Skylake processors are not officially supported due to security concerns. However, it is still possible to manually upgrade using an ISO image (as Windows 10 users on those processors will not be offered to upgrade to Windows 11 via Windows Update), or perform a clean installation as long as the system has Trusted Platform Module (TPM) 2.0 enabled, but the user must accept that they will not be entitled to receive updates, and that damage caused by using Windows 11 on an unsupported configuration are not covered by the manufacturer's warranty.

Most Skylake UEFI firmware implementations no longer support Windows XP and Windows Server 2003 because of incompatible ACPI, even if using legacy boot mode.

== Features ==
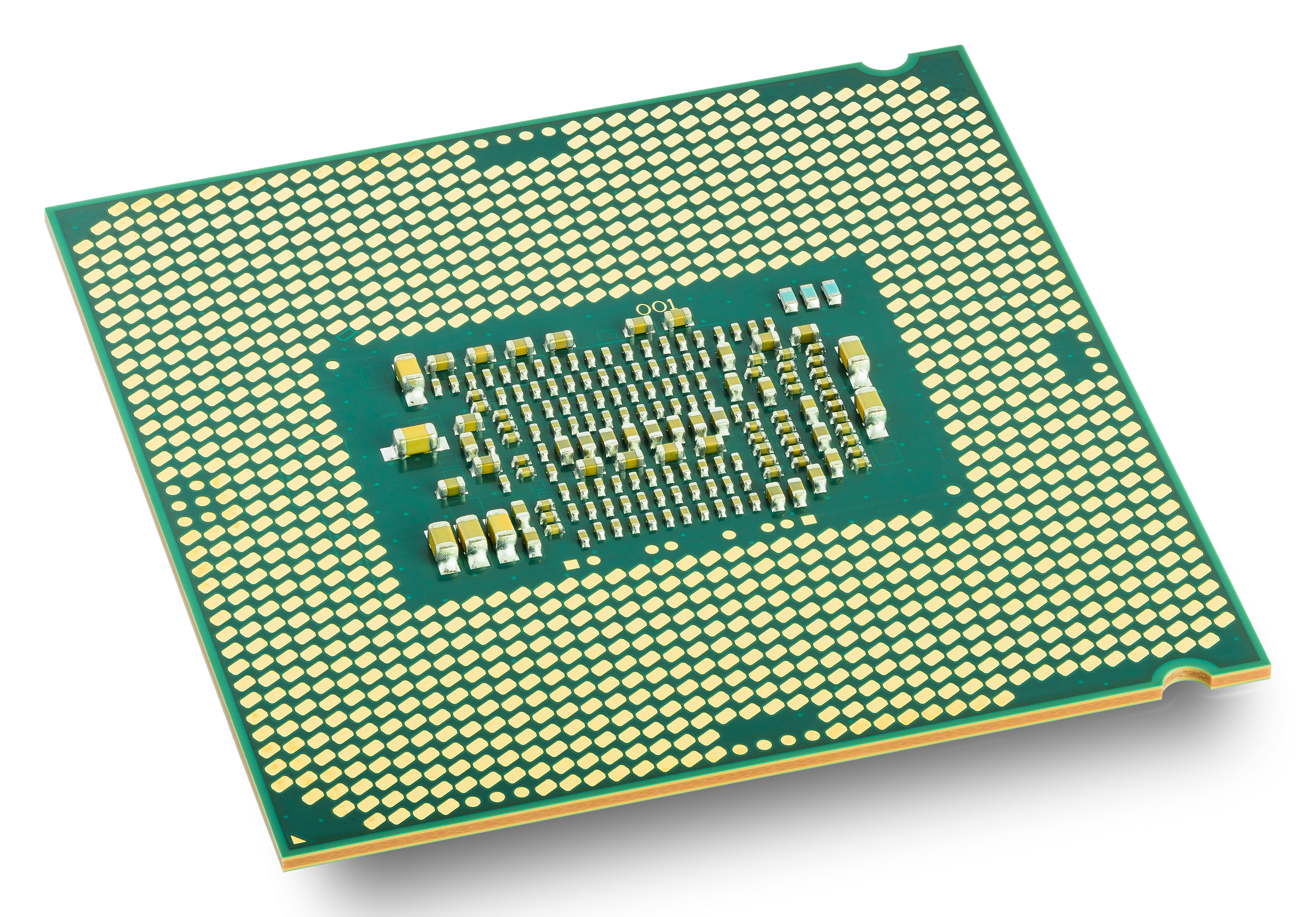
Skylake i7-6700K

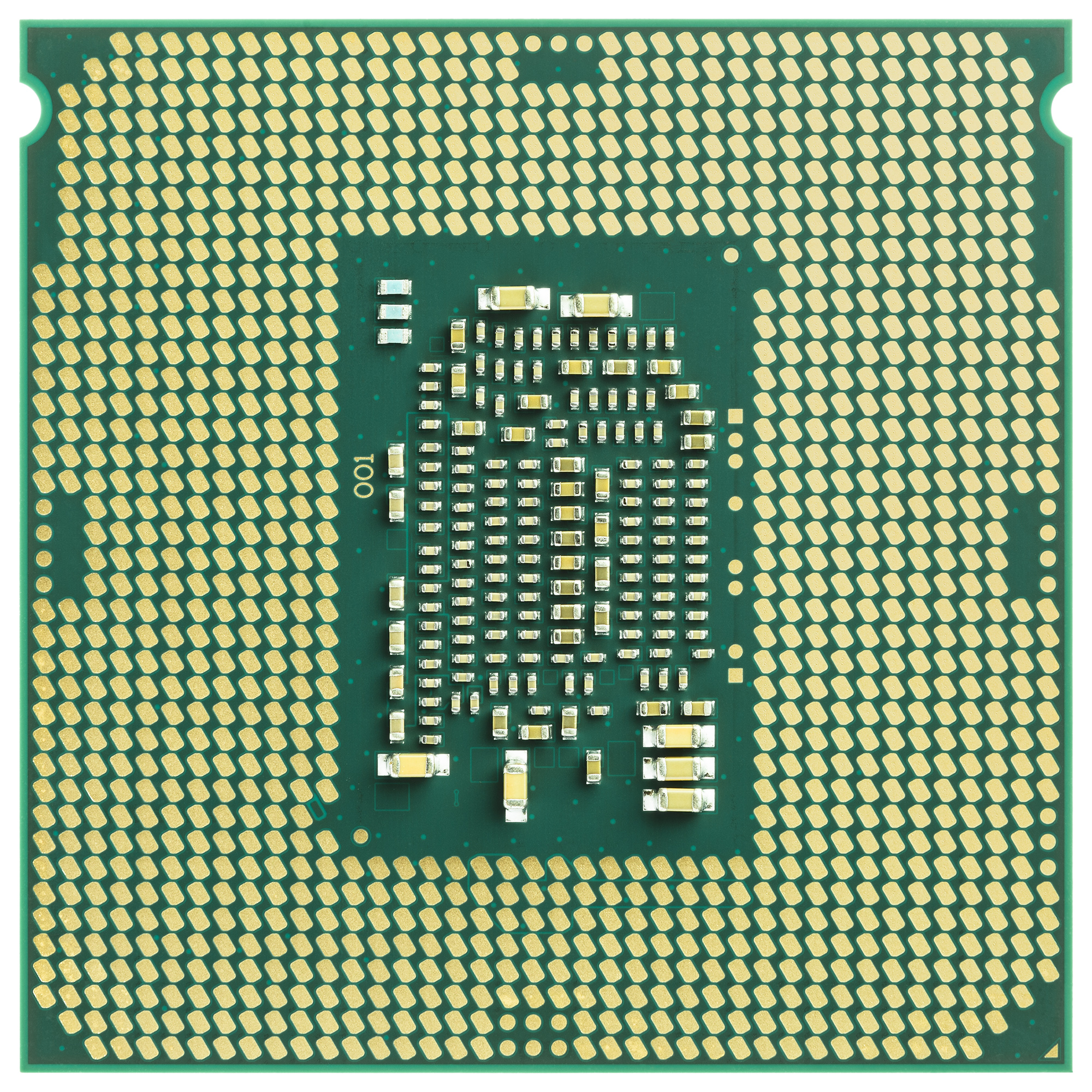
Skylake i7-6700K: bottom view

Like its predecessor, Broadwell, Skylake is available in five variants, identified by the suffixes S (SKL-S), X (SKL-X), H (SKL-H), U (SKL-U), and Y (SKL-Y). SKL-S and SKL-X contain overclockable K and X variants with unlocked multipliers. The H, U and Y variants are manufactured in ball grid array (BGA) packaging, while the S and X variants are manufactured in land grid array (LGA) packaging using a new socket, LGA 1151 (LGA 2066 for Skylake X). Skylake is used in conjunction with Intel 100 Series chipsets, also known as Sunrise Point.

The major changes between the Haswell and Skylake architectures include the removal of the fully integrated voltage regulator (FIVR) introduced with Haswell. On the variants that will use a discrete Platform Controller Hub (PCH), Direct Media Interface (DMI) 2.0 is replaced by DMI 3.0, which allows speeds of up to 8 GT/s.

Skylake's U and Y variants support one DIMM slot per channel, while H and S variants support two DIMM slots per channel. Skylake's launch and sales lifespan occur at the same time as the ongoing SDRAM market transition, with DDR3 SDRAM memory gradually being replaced by DDR4 SDRAM. Rather than working exclusively with DDR4, the Skylake microarchitecture remains backward compatible by interoperating with both types of memory. Accompanying the microarchitecture's support for both memory standards, a new SO-DIMM type capable of carrying either DDR3 or DDR4 memory chips, called UniDIMM, was also announced.

Skylake's few P variants have a reduced on-die graphics unit (12 execution units enabled instead of 24 execution units) over their direct counterparts; see the table below. In contrast, with Ivy Bridge CPUs the P suffix was used for CPUs with completely disabled on-die video chipset.

Other enhancements include Thunderbolt 3.0, Serial ATA Express, Iris Pro graphics with Direct3D feature level 12_1 with up to 128 MB of L4 eDRAM cache on certain SKUs. The Skylake line of processors retires VGA support, while supporting up to three monitors connected via HDMI 1.4, DisplayPort 1.2 or Embedded DisplayPort (eDP) interfaces. HDMI 2.0 (4K@60 Hz) is only supported on motherboards equipped with Intel's Alpine Ridge Thunderbolt controller.

The Skylake instruction set changes include Intel MPX (Memory Protection Extensions) and Intel SGX (Software Guard Extensions). Xeon variants also support Advanced Vector Extensions 3.2 (AVX-512F).

Skylake-based laptops were predicted to use wireless technology called Rezence for charging, and other wireless technologies for communication with peripherals. Many major PC vendors agreed to use this technology in Skylake-based laptops; however, no laptops were released with the technology as of 2019.

The integrated GPU of Skylake's S variant supports DirectX 12 Feature Level 12_1 on Windows, OpenGL 4.6 with a Windows 10 driver update and on Linux, and OpenCL 3.0 standards. The Quick Sync video engine now includes support for VP9 (GPU accelerated decode only), VP8 and HEVC (hardware accelerated 8-bit encode/decode and GPU accelerated 10-bit decode), and supports for resolutions up to 4096 × 2048.

Intel also released unlocked (overclocking capable) mobile Skylake CPUs.

Unlike previous generations, Skylake-based Xeon E3 no longer works with a desktop chipset that supports the same socket, and requires either the C232 or the C236 chipset to operate.

Starting from Skylake, Intel removed IDE mode of SATA and EHCI controllers from its client platform chipsets.

== Known issues ==
Short loops with a specific combination of instruction use may cause unpredictable system behavior on CPUs with hyper-threading. A microcode update was issued to fix the issue.

Skylake is vulnerable to Spectre attacks. In fact, it is more vulnerable than other processors because it uses indirect branch speculation not just on indirect branches but also when the return prediction stack underflows.

The latency for the spinlock PAUSE instruction has been increased dramatically (from the usual 10 cycles to 141 cycles in Skylake), which can cause performance issues with older programs or libraries using pause instructions. Intel documents the increased latency as a feature that improves power efficiency.

== Architecture changes compared to Broadwell microarchitecture ==
=== CPU ===
- Improved front-end, deeper out-of-order buffers, improved execution units, more execution units (third vector integer ALU(VALU)) for five ALUs in total, more load/store bandwidth, improved hyper-threading (wider retirement), speedup of AES-GCM and AES-CBC by 17% and 33% accordingly.
- Up to four cores as the default mainstream configuration and up to 18 cores for X-series
- AVX-512: F, CD, VL, BW, and DQ for Xeon Scalable and W variants, but not Xeon E3
- Intel Memory Protection Extensions (MPX)
- Intel Software Guard Extensions (SGX)
- Intel Transactional Synchronization Extensions (Disabled in 2021)
- Intel Speed Shift
- Larger re-order buffer (224 entries, up from 192)
- L2 cache was changed from 8-way to 4-way set associative
- Voltage regulator module (FIVR) is moved back to the motherboard
- Enhancements of Intel Processor Trace: fine-grained timing through CYC packets (cycle-accurate mode) and support for Instruction Pointer (IP) address filtering.
- 64 to 128 MB L4 eDRAM cache on certain SKUs
- Add C10 C-states on certain SKUs (mobile)
- Improved RAPL sensor interfaces to reduce OEM deviation

=== GPU ===
- Skylake's integrated Gen9 GPU supports Direct3D 12 at feature level 12_1
- OpenGL 4.6 support on both Windows and Linux
- Vulkan 1.3 support (1.4 on Linux by Mesa 25.0 and intel ANV driver)
- Improve multimedia features
  - Full fixed function HEVC Main/8bit encoding(only 4:2:0) and decoding acceleration (Level 5.1).
  - Hybrid/Partial HEVC Main10/10bit decoding acceleration.
  - Partial VP9 decoding acceleration.
  - JPEG encoding acceleration for resolutions up to 16,000×16,000 pixels.
  - Offloading some media decoding functionality to HEVC/H.265 micro controller (HuC)
- Frame Buffer Compression (FBC)
- Up to 72 Execution Units (from 48)
- Add Multiplane Overlay (MPO)
- 16-bit float support

=== I/O ===
- LGA 1151 socket for mainstream desktop processors and LGA 2066 socket for enthusiast gaming/workstation X-series processors
- 100-series chipset (Sunrise Point) and 200-series chipset (Union Point)
- NVMe PCIe 3.0 x4 support through chipset
- X-series uses X299-series chipset
- DMI 3.0 (From DMI 2.0)
- Support for both DDR3L SDRAM and DDR4 SDRAM in mainstream variants, using custom UniDIMM SO-DIMM form factor with up to 64 GB of RAM on LGA 1151 variants. Usual DDR3 memory is also supported by certain motherboard vendors even though Intel does not officially support it.
- Support for 16 PCI Express 3.0 lanes from CPU, 20 PCI Express 3.0 lanes from PCH (LGA 1151), 44 PCI Express 3.0 lanes for Skylake-X
- Support for Thunderbolt 3 (Alpine Ridge)

=== Other ===
- Thermal design power (TDP) up to 95 W (LGA 1151); up to 165 W (LGA 2066)
- 14 nm manufacturing process

== Configurations ==
Skylake processors are produced in seven main families: Y, U, H, S, X, W, and SP. Multiple configurations are available within each family:

Feature	Family								
Feature	Y	U	H	T	S	R	X	W	SP
Max cores	2		4				18	28	
Integrated L4 cache (eDRAM)		•	•			•			
Low-power mobile/embedded systems	•	•	•	•					
Socket	BGA			LGA 1151			LGA 2066		LGA 3647
LPDDR3 SDRAM	•	•	•						
DDR3L SDRAM	•	•	•	•	•	•			
DDR4 SDRAM		•	•	•	•	•	•	•	
128 GB to 1.5 TB of physical RAM							•	•	•+
28 to 44 PCIe 3.0 lanes							•	•	•

== List of Skylake processor models ==
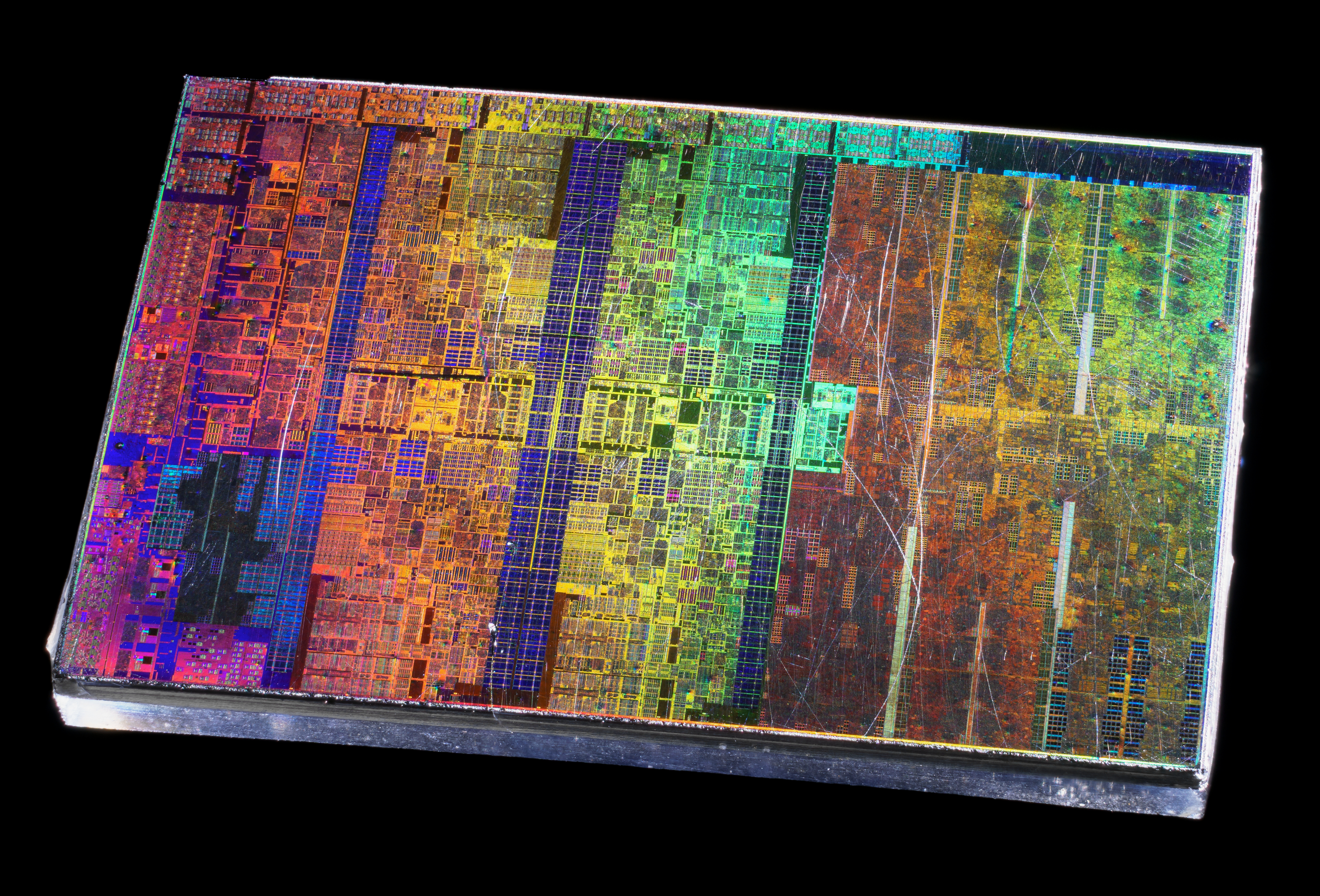
Core i7-6700 die shot

=== Mainstream desktop processors ===
Common features of the mainstream desktop Skylake CPUs:

- DMI 3.0 and PCIe 3.0 interfaces
- Dual-channel memory support in the following configurations: DDR3L-1600 1.35 V (32 GB maximum) or DDR4-2133 1.2 V (64 GB maximum). DDR3 is unofficially supported through some motherboard vendors
- 16 PCIe 3.0 lanes
- The Core-branded processors support the AVX2 instruction set. The Celeron and Pentium-branded ones only support up to SSE4.2
- 350 MHz base graphics clock rate

Processor branding and model		Cores (threads)	Clock rate (GHz)				GPU			Cache			TDP	Socket	Release date	Release price (USD)
Processor branding and model		Cores (threads)	Base	Turbo Boost 2.0			Model	EUs	Max freq. (GHz)	L2	L3	L4 (eDRAM)	TDP	Socket	Release date	Release price (USD)
Processor branding and model		Cores (threads)	Base	1	2	4	Model	EUs	Max freq. (GHz)	L2	L3	L4 (eDRAM)	TDP	Socket	Release date	Release price (USD)
Core i7	6700K	4 (8)	4.0	4.2	4.0		HD 530	24	1.15	1 MB	8 MB	—N/a	91 W	LGA 1151	August 5, 2015	$339
Core i7	6785R	4 (8)	3.3	3.9	3.8	3.5	Iris Pro 580	72	1.15	1 MB	8 MB	128 MB	65 W	BGA 1440	May 3, 2016	$370
Core i7	6700	4 (8)	3.4	4.0	3.9	3.7	HD 530	24	1.15	1 MB	8 MB	—N/a	65 W	LGA 1151	September 1, 2015	$303
Core i7	6700T	4 (8)	2.8	3.6	3.5	3.4	HD 530	24	1.15	1 MB	8 MB	—N/a	35 W	LGA 1151	September 1, 2015	$303
Core i5	6600K	4 (4)	3.5	3.9	3.8	3.6	HD 530	24	1.15	1 MB	6 MB	—N/a	91 W	LGA 1151	August 5, 2015	$242
Core i5	6685R	4 (4)	3.2	3.8	3.7	3.3	Iris Pro 580	72	1.15	1 MB	6 MB	128 MB	65 W	BGA 1440	May 3, 2016	$288
Core i5	6600	4 (4)	3.3	3.9	3.8	3.6	HD 530	24	1.15	1 MB	6 MB	—N/a	65 W	LGA 1151	September 1, 2015	$213
Core i5	6585R	4 (4)	2.8	3.6	3.5	3.1	Iris Pro 580	72	1.1	1 MB	6 MB	128 MB	65 W	BGA 1440	May 3, 2016	$255
Core i5	6500	4 (4)	3.2	3.6	3.5	3.3	HD 530	24	1.05	1 MB	6 MB	—N/a	65 W	LGA 1151	September 1, 2015	$192
Core i5	6600T	4 (4)	2.7	3.5	3.4	3.3	HD 530	24	1.1	1 MB	6 MB	—N/a	35 W	LGA 1151	Q3 2015	$213
Core i5	6500T	4 (4)	2.5	3.1	3.0	2.8	HD 530	24	1.1	1 MB	6 MB	—N/a	35 W	LGA 1151	Q3 2015	$192
Core i5	6402P	4 (4)	2.8	3.4		3.2	HD 510	12	0.95	1 MB	6 MB	—N/a	65 W	LGA 1151	December 27, 2015	$182
Core i5	6400T	4 (4)	2.2	2.8	2.7	2.5	HD 530	24	0.95	1 MB	6 MB	—N/a	35 W	LGA 1151	Q3 2015	$182
Core i5	6400	4 (4)	2.7	3.3		3.1	HD 530	24	0.95	1 MB	6 MB	—N/a	65 W	LGA 1151	August 5, 2015	$182
Core i3	6320	2 (4)	3.9	—N/a			HD 530	24	1.15	512 KB	4 MB	—N/a	51 W	LGA 1151	Q3 2015	$149
Core i3	6300	2 (4)	3.8	—N/a			HD 530	24	1.15	512 KB	4 MB	—N/a	51 W	LGA 1151	Q3 2015	$138
Core i3	6100	2 (4)	3.7	—N/a			HD 530	24	1.05	512 KB	3 MB	—N/a	51 W	LGA 1151	October 2015	$117
Core i3	6300T	2 (4)	3.3	—N/a			HD 530	24	0.95	512 KB	4 MB	—N/a	35 W	LGA 1151	October 2015	$138
Core i3	6100T	2 (4)	3.2	—N/a			HD 530	24	0.95	512 KB	3 MB	—N/a	35 W	LGA 1151	October 2015	$117
Core i3	6098P	2 (4)	3.6	—N/a			HD 510	12	1.050	512 KB	3 MB	—N/a	54 W	LGA 1151	December 27, 2015	$117
Pentium	G4520	2 (2)	3.6	—N/a			HD 530	24	1.050	512 KB	3 MB	—N/a	51 W	LGA 1151	October 2015	$86
Pentium	G4500	2 (2)	3.5	—N/a			HD 530	24	1.050	512 KB	3 MB	—N/a	51 W	LGA 1151	October 2015	$75
Pentium	G4500T	2 (2)	3.0	—N/a			HD 530	24	0.95	512 KB	3 MB	—N/a	35 W	LGA 1151	Q3 2015	$75
Pentium	G4400	2 (2)	3.3	—N/a			HD 510	12	1.0	512 KB	3 MB	—N/a	54 W	LGA 1151	October 2015	$64
Pentium	G4400T	2 (2)	2.9	—N/a			HD 510	12	0.95	512 KB	3 MB	—N/a	35 W	LGA 1151	Q3 2015	$64
Pentium	G4400TE	2 (2)	2.4	—N/a			HD 510	12	0.95	512 KB	3 MB	—N/a	35 W	LGA 1151	Q4 2015	$70
Celeron	G3920	2 (2)	2.9	—N/a			HD 510	12	0.95	512 KB	2 MB	—N/a	51 W	LGA 1151	Q4 2015	$52
Celeron	G3900	2 (2)	2.8	—N/a			HD 510	12	0.95	512 KB	2 MB	—N/a	51 W	LGA 1151	Q4 2015	$42
Celeron	G3900TE	2 (2)	2.3	—N/a			HD 510	12	0.95	512 KB	2 MB	—N/a	35 W	LGA 1151	Q4 2015	$42
Celeron	G3900T	2 (2)	2.6	—N/a			HD 510	12	0.95	512 KB	2 MB	—N/a	35 W	LGA 1151	Q4 2015	$42

=== High-end desktop processors (Skylake-X) ===
Common features of the high-performance Skylake-X CPUs:

- In addition to the AVX2 instruction set, they also support the AVX-512 instructions
- No built-in iGPU (integrated graphics processor)
- Turbo Boost Max Technology 3.0 for up to two/four threads workloads for CPUs that have eight cores and more (7820X, 7900X, 7920X, 7940X, 7960X, 7980XE, and all ninth generation chips)
- A different cache hierarchy (when compared to client Skylake CPUs or previous architectures)

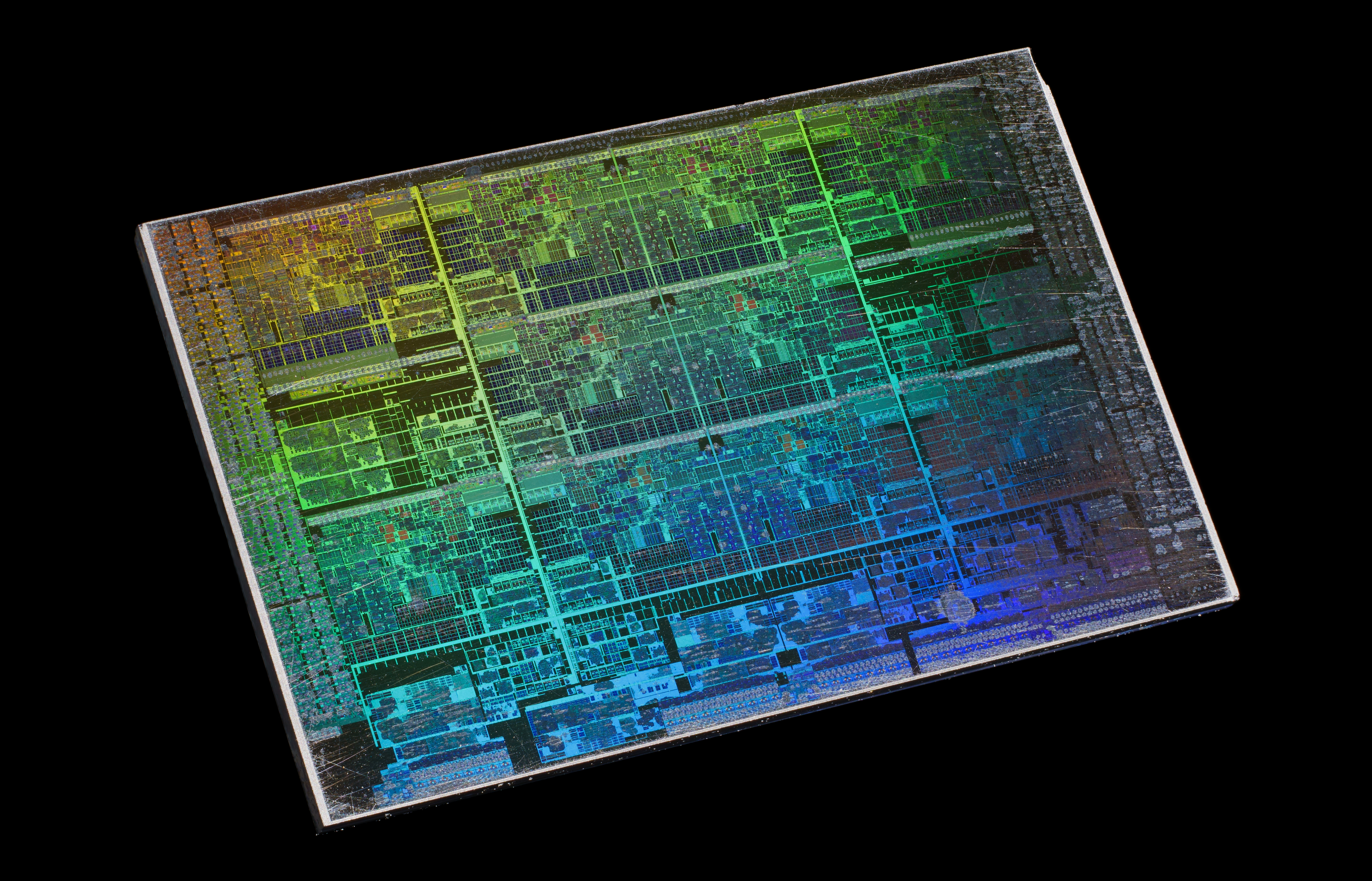
Core i7-7820X die shot

Seventh-generation Skylake-X high-end desktop CPUs
Processor branding and model		Cores (threads)	Clock rate (GHz)			Cache		PCIe lanes	Memory support	Socket	TDP	Release date	Release price (USD)
Processor branding and model		Cores (threads)	Base	Turbo		L2	L3	PCIe lanes	Memory support	Socket	TDP	Release date	Release price (USD)
Processor branding and model		Cores (threads)	Base	2.0	3.0	L2	L3	PCIe lanes	Memory support	Socket	TDP	Release date	Release price (USD)
Core i9	7980XE	18 (36)	2.6	4.2	4.4	18 MB	24.75 MB	44; PCIe 3.0	DDR4-2666 quad-channel	LGA 2066	165 W	Sep 25, 2017	$1999
Core i9	7960X	16 (32)	2.8	4.2	4.4	16 MB	22 MB	44; PCIe 3.0	DDR4-2666 quad-channel	LGA 2066	165 W	Sep 25, 2017	$1699
Core i9	7940X	14 (28)	3.1	4.3	4.4	14 MB	19.25 MB	44; PCIe 3.0	DDR4-2666 quad-channel	LGA 2066	165 W	Sep 25, 2017	$1399
Core i9	7920X	12 (24)	2.9	4.3	4.4	12 MB	16.5 MB	44; PCIe 3.0	DDR4-2666 quad-channel	LGA 2066	140 W	Aug 28, 2017	$1189
Core i9	7900X	10 (20)	3.3	4.3	4.5	10 MB	13.75 MB	44; PCIe 3.0	DDR4-2666 quad-channel	LGA 2066	140 W	Jun 19, 2017	$999
Core i7	7820X	8 (16)	3.6	4.3	4.5	8 MB	11 MB	28; PCIe 3.0	DDR4-2666 quad-channel	LGA 2066	140 W	Jun 19, 2017	$599
Core i7	7800X	6 (12)	3.5	4.0	—N/a	6 MB	8.25 MB	28; PCIe 3.0	DDR4-2400 quad-channel	LGA 2066	140 W	Jun 19, 2017	$389

Ninth-generation Skylake-X high-end desktop CPUs
Processor branding and model		Cores (threads)	Clock rate (GHz)			Cache		PCIe lanes	Memory support	Socket	TDP	Release date	Release price (USD)
Processor branding and model		Cores (threads)	Base	Turbo Boost		L2	L3	PCIe lanes	Memory support	Socket	TDP	Release date	Release price (USD)
Processor branding and model		Cores (threads)	Base	2.0	3.0	L2	L3	PCIe lanes	Memory support	Socket	TDP	Release date	Release price (USD)
Core i9	9990XE	14 (28)	4.0	5.0	5.0	14 MB	19.25 MB	44; PCIe 3.0	DDR4-2666 quad-channel	LGA 2066	255 W	Jan 3, 2019	OEM
Core i9	9980XE	18 (36)	3.0	4.4	4.5	18 MB	24.75 MB	44; PCIe 3.0	DDR4-2666 quad-channel	LGA 2066	165 W	Oct 9, 2018	$1979
Core i9	9960X	16 (32)	3.1	4.4	4.5	16 MB	22 MB	44; PCIe 3.0	DDR4-2666 quad-channel	LGA 2066	165 W	Oct 9, 2018	$1684
Core i9	9940X	14 (28)	3.3	4.4	4.5	14 MB	19.25 MB	44; PCIe 3.0	DDR4-2666 quad-channel	LGA 2066	165 W	Oct 9, 2018	$1387
Core i9	9920X	12 (24)	3.5	4.4	4.5	12 MB	19.25 MB	44; PCIe 3.0	DDR4-2666 quad-channel	LGA 2066	165 W	Oct 9, 2018	$1189
Core i9	9900X	10 (20)	3.5	4.4	4.5	10 MB	19.25 MB	44; PCIe 3.0	DDR4-2666 quad-channel	LGA 2066	165 W	Oct 9, 2018	$989
Core i9	9820X	10 (20)	3.3	4.1	4.2	10 MB	16.5 MB	44; PCIe 3.0	DDR4-2666 quad-channel	LGA 2066	165 W	Oct 9, 2018	$889
Core i7	9800X	8 (16)	3.8	4.4	4.5	8 MB	16.5 MB	44; PCIe 3.0	DDR4-2666 quad-channel	LGA 2066	165 W	Oct 9, 2018	$589

=== Xeon high-end desktop processors (Skylake-X) ===
- Marketed as a Xeon
- Uses the C621 chipset
- Xeon W-3175X was the only Xeon with a multiplier officially unlocked for overclocking until the introduction of Sapphire Rapids-WS Xeon CPUs in 2023.

Model	sSpec number	Cores (threads)	Clock rate	Turbo Boost all-core/2.0 (/max. 3.0)	L2 cache	L3 cache	TDP	Socket	I/O bus	Memory	Release date	Part number(s)	Release price (USD)
Xeon W-3175X	SRF6L (H0)	28 (56)	3.1 GHz	3.8/4.3 GHz	28 × 1 MB	38.50 MB	255 W	LGA 3647	DMI 3.0	6 × DDR4-2666	January 30, 2019	CD8067304237800; BX80673W3175X	$2999

=== Mobile processors ===
For mobile workstation processors, see Server processors

Processor branding and model		Cores (threads)	CPU clock rate	CPU Turbo clock rate			GPU	GPU clock rate		Cache		Max. PCIe lanes	TDP	cTDP		Release date	Price (USD)
Processor branding and model		Cores (threads)	CPU clock rate	Single core	Dual core	Quad core	GPU	Base	Turbo	L3	L4 (eDRAM)	Max. PCIe lanes	TDP	Up	Down	Release date	Price (USD)
Core i7	6970HQ	4 (8)	2.8 GHz	3.7 GHz	?		Iris Pro 580	350 MHz	1050 MHz	8 MB	128 MB	16	45 W	—N/a	35 W	Q1 2016	$623
Core i7	6920HQ	4 (8)	2.9 GHz	3.8 GHz	3.6 GHz	3.4 GHz	HD 530	350 MHz	1050 MHz	8 MB	—N/a	16	45 W	—N/a	35 W	September 1, 2015	$568
Core i7	6870HQ	4 (8)	2.7 GHz	3.6 GHz	?		Iris Pro 580	350 MHz	1000 MHz	8 MB	128 MB	16	45 W	—N/a	35 W	Q1 2016	$434
Core i7	6820HQ	4 (8)	2.7 GHz	3.6 GHz	3.4 GHz	3.2 GHz	HD 530	350 MHz	1050 MHz	8 MB	—N/a	16	45 W	—N/a	35 W	September 1, 2015	$378
Core i7	6820HK	4 (8)	2.7 GHz	3.6 GHz	3.4 GHz	3.2 GHz	HD 530	350 MHz	1050 MHz	8 MB	—N/a	16	45 W	—N/a	35 W	September 1, 2015	$378
Core i7	6770HQ	4 (8)	2.6 GHz	3.5 GHz	?		Iris Pro 580	350 MHz	950 MHz	6 MB	128 MB	16	45 W	—N/a	35 W	Q1 2016	$434
Core i7	6700HQ	4 (8)	2.6 GHz	3.5 GHz	3.3 GHz	3.1 GHz	HD 530	350 MHz	1050 MHz	6 MB	—N/a	16	45 W	—N/a	35 W	September 1, 2015	$378
Core i7	6660U	2 (4)	2.4 GHz	3.4 GHz	3.2 GHz	—N/a	Iris 540	300 MHz	1050 MHz	4 MB	64 MB	12	15 W	—N/a	9.5 W	Q1 2016	$415
Core i7	6650U	2 (4)	2.2 GHz	3.4 GHz	3.2 GHz	—N/a	Iris 540	300 MHz	1050 MHz	4 MB	64 MB	12	15 W	—N/a	9.5 W	Q3 2015	$415
Core i7	6600U	2 (4)	2.6 GHz	3.4 GHz	—N/a	—N/a	HD 520	300 MHz	1050 MHz	4 MB	—N/a	12	15 W	25 W	7.5 W	September 1, 2015	$393
Core i7	6567U	2 (4)	3.3 GHz	3.6 GHz	3.4 GHz	—N/a	Iris 550	300 MHz	1100 MHz	4 MB	64 MB	12	28 W	—N/a	23 W	Q3 2015	TBD
Core i7	6560U	2 (4)	2.2 GHz	3.2 GHz	3.1 GHz	—N/a	Iris 540	300 MHz	1050 MHz	4 MB	64 MB	12	15 W	—N/a	9.5 W	Q3 2015	TBD
Core i7	6500U	2 (4)	2.5 GHz	3.1 GHz	3.0 GHz	—N/a	HD 520	300 MHz	1050 MHz	4 MB	—N/a	12	15 W	—N/a	7.5 W	September 1, 2015	$393
Core i5	6440HQ	4 (4)	2.6 GHz	3.5 GHz	3.3 GHz	3.1 GHz	HD 530	350 MHz	950 MHz	6 MB	—N/a	16	45 W	—N/a	35 W	September 1, 2015	$250
Core i5	6360U	2 (4)	2.0 GHz	3.1 GHz	2.9 GHz	—N/a	Iris 540	300 MHz	1000 MHz	4 MB	64 MB	12	15 W	—N/a	9.5 W	Q3 2015	$304
Core i5	6350HQ	4 (4)	2.3 GHz	3.2 GHz	?		Iris Pro 580	350 MHz	900 MHz	6 MB	128 MB	16	45 W	—N/a	35 W	Q1 2016	$306
Core i5	6300HQ	4 (4)	2.3 GHz	3.2 GHz	3.0 GHz	2.8 GHz	HD 530	350 MHz	950 MHz	6 MB	—N/a	16	45 W	—N/a	35 W	September 1, 2015	$250
Core i5	6300U	2 (4)	2.4 GHz	3.0 GHz	2.9 GHz	—N/a	HD 520	300 MHz	1000 MHz	3 MB	—N/a	12	15 W	—N/a	7.5 W	September 1, 2015	$281
Core i5	6287U	2 (4)	3.1 GHz	3.5 GHz	3.3 GHz	—N/a	Iris 550	300 MHz	1100 MHz	4 MB	64 MB	12	28 W	—N/a	23 W	Q3 2015	$304
Core i5	6267U	2 (4)	2.9 GHz	3.3 GHz	3.1 GHz	—N/a	Iris 550	300 MHz	1050 MHz	4 MB	64 MB	12	28 W	—N/a	23 W	Q3 2015	$304
Core i5	6260U	2 (4)	1.8 GHz	2.9 GHz	2.7 GHz	—N/a	Iris 540	300 MHz	950 MHz	4 MB	64 MB	12	15 W	—N/a	9.5 W	Q3 2015	$304
Core i5	6200U	2 (4)	2.3 GHz	2.8 GHz	2.7 GHz	—N/a	HD 520	300 MHz	1000 MHz	3 MB	—N/a	12	15 W	—N/a	7.5 W	September 1, 2015	$281
Core i3	6167U	2 (4)	2.7 GHz	—N/a	—N/a	—N/a	Iris 550	300 MHz	1000 MHz	3 MB	64 MB	12	28 W	—N/a	23 W	Q3 2015	$304
Core i3	6157U	2 (4)	2.4 GHz	—N/a	—N/a	—N/a	Iris 550	300 MHz	1000 MHz	3 MB	64 MB	12	28 W	—N/a	23 W	Q3 2016	$304
Core i3	6100H	2 (4)	2.7 GHz	—N/a	—N/a	—N/a	HD 530	350 MHz	900 MHz	3 MB	—N/a	12	35 W	—N/a	—N/a	September 1, 2015	$225
Core i3	6100U	2 (4)	2.3 GHz	—N/a	—N/a	—N/a	HD 520	300 MHz	1000 MHz	3 MB	—N/a	12	15 W	—N/a	7.5 W	September 1, 2015	$281
Core i3	6006U	2 (4)	2.0 GHz	—N/a	—N/a	—N/a	HD 520	300 MHz	900 MHz	3 MB	—N/a	12	15 W	—N/a	—N/a	November, 2016	$281
Core m7	6Y75	2 (4)	1.2 GHz	3.1 GHz	2.9 GHz	—N/a	HD 515	300 MHz	1000 MHz	4 MB	—N/a	10	4.5 W	7 W	3.5 W	September 1, 2015	$393
Core m5	6Y57	2 (4)	1.1 GHz	2.8 GHz	2.4 GHz	—N/a	HD 515	300 MHz	900 MHz	4 MB	—N/a	10	4.5 W	7 W	3.5 W	September 1, 2015	$281
Core m5	6Y54	2 (4)	1.1 GHz	2.7 GHz	2.4 GHz	—N/a	HD 515	300 MHz	900 MHz	4 MB	—N/a	10	4.5 W	7 W	3.5 W	September 1, 2015	$281
Core m3	6Y30	2 (4)	0.9 GHz	2.2 GHz	2.0 GHz	—N/a	HD 515	300 MHz	850 MHz	4 MB	—N/a	10	4.5 W	7 W	3.8 W	September 1, 2015	$281
Pentium	4405U	2 (4)	2.1 GHz	—N/a	—N/a	—N/a	HD 510	300 MHz	950 MHz	2 MB	—N/a	10	15 W	—N/a	10 W	Q3 2015	$161
Pentium	4405Y	2 (4)	1.5 GHz	—N/a	—N/a	—N/a	HD 515	300 MHz	800 MHz	2 MB	—N/a	10	6 W	—N/a	4.5 W	Q3 2015	$161
Celeron	G3902E	2 (2)	1.6 GHz	—N/a			HD 510	350 MHz	950 MHz	2 MB	—N/a	16	25 W	—N/a	—N/a	Q1 2016	$107
Celeron	G3900E	2 (2)	2.4 GHz	—N/a			HD 510	350 MHz	950 MHz	2 MB	—N/a	16	35 W	—N/a	—N/a	Q1 2016	$107
Celeron	3955U	2 (2)	2.0 GHz	—N/a			HD 510	300 MHz	900 MHz	2 MB	—N/a	10	15 W	—N/a	10 W	Q4 2015	$107
Celeron	3855U	2 (2)	1.6 GHz	—N/a			HD 510	300 MHz	900 MHz	2 MB	—N/a	10	15 W	—N/a	10 W	Q4 2015	$107

=== Workstation processors ===
- All models support: MMX, SSE, SSE2, SSE3, SSSE3, SSE4.1, SSE4.2, AVX, AVX2, AVX-512, FMA3, MPX, Enhanced Intel SpeedStep Technology (EIST), Intel 64, XD bit (an NX bit implementation), Intel VT-x, Intel VT-d, Turbo Boost (excluding W-2102 and W-2104), Hyper-threading (excluding W-2102 and W-2104), AES-NI, Intel TSX-NI, Smart Cache.
- PCI Express lanes: 48
- Supports up to eight DIMMs of DDR4 memory, maximum 512 GB.

Model	sSpec number	Cores (threads)	Clock rate	Turbo Boost all-core/2.0 (/max. 3.0)	L2 cache	L3 cache	TDP	Socket	I/O bus	Memory	Release date	Part number(s)	Release price (USD)
Xeon W-2195	SR3RX (M0)	18 (36)	2.3 GHz	3.2/4.3 GHz	18 × 1 MB	24.75 MB	140 W	LGA 2066	DMI 3.0	4 × DDR4-2666	August 29, 2017	CD8067303805901	$2553
Xeon W-2191B	SR3RW (H0)	18 (36)	2.3 GHz	3.2/4.3 GHz	18 × 1 MB	24.75 MB	140 W	LGA 2066	DMI 3.0	4 × DDR4-2666	December 21, 2017		OEM for Apple
Xeon W-2175	SR3W2 (M0)	14 (28)	2.5 GHz	3.3/4.3 GHz	14 × 1 MB	19.25 MB	140 W	LGA 2066	DMI 3.0	4 × DDR4-2666	October 15, 2017	CD8067303842300	$1947
Xeon W-2170B	SR3W3 (H0)	14 (28)	2.5 GHz	3.3/4.3 GHz	14 × 1 MB	19.25 MB	140 W	LGA 2066	DMI 3.0	4 × DDR4-2666	December 21, 2017		OEM for Apple
Xeon W-2155	SR3LR (U0)	10 (20)	3.3 GHz	4.0/4.5 GHz	10 × 1 MB	13.75 MB	140 W	LGA 2066	DMI 3.0	4 × DDR4-2666	August 29, 2017	CD8067303533703	$1440
Xeon W-2150B	SR3LS (H0)	10 (20)	3 GHz	4.0/4.5 GHz	10 × 1 MB	13.75 MB	120 W	LGA 2066	DMI 3.0	4 × DDR4-2666	December 21, 2017		OEM for Apple
Xeon W-2145	SR3LQ (U0)	8 (16)	3.7 GHz	4.3/4.5 GHz	8 × 1 MB	11.00 MB	140 W	LGA 2066	DMI 3.0	4 × DDR4-2666	August 29, 2017	CD8067303533601	$1113
Xeon W-2140B	SR3LK (H0)	8 (16)	3.2 GHz	3.9/4.2 GHz	8 × 1 MB	11.00 MB	120 W	LGA 2066	DMI 3.0	4 × DDR4-2666	December 21, 2017		OEM for Apple
Xeon W-2135	SR3LN (U0)	6 (12)	3.7 GHz	4.4/4.5 GHz	6 × 1 MB	8.25 MB	140 W	LGA 2066	DMI 3.0	4 × DDR4-2666	August 29, 2017	CD8067303533403	$835
Xeon W-2133	SR3LL (U0)	6 (12)	3.6 GHz	3.8/3.9 GHz	6 × 1 MB	8.25 MB	140 W	LGA 2066	DMI 3.0	4 × DDR4-2666	August 29, 2017	CD8067303533204	$617
Xeon W-2125	SR3LM (U0)	4 (8)	4 GHz	4.4/4.5 GHz	4 × 1 MB	8.25 MB	120 W	LGA 2066	DMI 3.0	4 × DDR4-2666	August 29, 2017	CD8067303533303	$444
Xeon W-2123	SR3LJ (U0)	4 (8)	3.6 GHz	3.7/3.9 GHz	4 × 1 MB	8.25 MB	120 W	LGA 2066	DMI 3.0	4 × DDR4-2666	August 29, 2017	CD8067303533002	$294
Xeon W-2104	SR3LH (U0)	4 (4)	3.2 GHz	N/A	4 × 1 MB	8.25 MB	120 W	LGA 2066	DMI 3.0	4 × DDR4-2400	August 29, 2017	CD8067303532903	$255
Xeon W-2102	SR3LG (U0)	4 (4)	2.9 GHz	N/A	4 × 1 MB	8.25 MB	120 W	LGA 2066	DMI 3.0	4 × DDR4-2400	August 29, 2017	CD8067303532802	$202

=== Server processors ===
E3 series server chips all consist of System Bus 9 GT/s, maximum memory bandwidth of 34.1 GB/s dual channel memory. Unlike its predecessor, the Skylake Xeon CPUs require C230 series (C232/C236) or C240 series (C242/C246) chipset to operate, with integrated graphics working only with C236 and C246 chipsets. Mobile counterparts uses CM230 and CM240 series chipsets.

Skylake E3-12xx and E3 15xx v5 SKUs
Target segment	Cores (threads)	Processor branding and model		GPU	Clock rate				Cache		TDP	Release date	Release price (USD) tray / box	Motherboard		
Target segment	Cores (threads)	Processor branding and model		GPU	CPU		Graphics		L3	L4 (eDRAM)	TDP	Release date	Release price (USD) tray / box	Socket	Interface	Memory
Target segment	Cores (threads)	Processor branding and model		GPU	Normal	Turbo	Normal	Turbo	L3	L4 (eDRAM)	TDP	Release date	Release price (USD) tray / box	Socket	Interface	Memory
Server	4 (8)	Xeon E3 v5	1280v5	—N/a	3.7 GHz	4.0 GHz	—N/a		8 MB	—N/a	80 W	Q4 2015	$612 / —	LGA; 1151	DMI 3.0; PCIe 3.0	DDR4; 2133/1866 or DDR3L; 1333/1600 with ECC
Server	4 (8)	Xeon E3 v5	1275v5	HD P530	3.6 GHz	4.0 GHz	350 MHz	1.15 GHz	8 MB	—N/a	80 W	Q4 2015	$339 / —	LGA; 1151	DMI 3.0; PCIe 3.0	DDR4; 2133/1866 or DDR3L; 1333/1600 with ECC
Server	4 (8)	Xeon E3 v5	1270v5	—N/a	3.6 GHz	4.0 GHz	—N/a		8 MB	—N/a	80 W	Q4 2015	$328 / $339	LGA; 1151	DMI 3.0; PCIe 3.0	DDR4; 2133/1866 or DDR3L; 1333/1600 with ECC
Server	4 (8)	Xeon E3 v5	1260Lv5	—N/a	2.9 GHz	3.9 GHz	—N/a		8 MB	—N/a	45 W	Q4 2015	$294 / —	LGA; 1151	DMI 3.0; PCIe 3.0	DDR4; 2133/1866 or DDR3L; 1333/1600 with ECC
Server	4 (8)	Xeon E3 v5	1245v5	HD P530	3.5 GHz	3.9 GHz	350 MHz	1.15 GHz	8 MB	—N/a	80 W	Q4 2015	$284 / —	LGA; 1151	DMI 3.0; PCIe 3.0	DDR4; 2133/1866 or DDR3L; 1333/1600 with ECC
Server	4 (8)	Xeon E3 v5	1240v5	—N/a	3.5 GHz	3.9 GHz	—N/a		8 MB	—N/a	80 W	Q4 2015	$272 / $282	LGA; 1151	DMI 3.0; PCIe 3.0	DDR4; 2133/1866 or DDR3L; 1333/1600 with ECC
Server	4 (8)	Xeon E3 v5	1240Lv5	—N/a	2.1 GHz	3.2 GHz	—N/a		8 MB	—N/a	25 W	Q4 2015	$278 / —	LGA; 1151	DMI 3.0; PCIe 3.0	DDR4; 2133/1866 or DDR3L; 1333/1600 with ECC
Server	4 (8)	Xeon E3 v5	1230v5	—N/a	3.4 GHz	3.8 GHz	—N/a		8 MB	—N/a	80 W	Q4 2015	$250 / $260	LGA; 1151	DMI 3.0; PCIe 3.0	DDR4; 2133/1866 or DDR3L; 1333/1600 with ECC
Server	4 (4)	Xeon E3 v5	1235Lv5	HD P530	2.0 GHz	3.0 GHz	350 MHz	1.15 GHz	8 MB	—N/a	25 W	Q4 2015	$250 / —	LGA; 1151	DMI 3.0; PCIe 3.0	DDR4; 2133/1866 or DDR3L; 1333/1600 with ECC
Server	4 (4)	Xeon E3 v5	1225v5	HD P530	3.3 GHz	3.7 GHz	350 MHz	1.15 GHz	8 MB	—N/a	80 W	Q4 2015	$213 / —	LGA; 1151	DMI 3.0; PCIe 3.0	DDR4; 2133/1866 or DDR3L; 1333/1600 with ECC
Server	4 (4)	Xeon E3 v5	1220v5	—N/a	3.0 GHz	3.5 GHz	—N/a		8 MB	—N/a	80 W	Q4 2015	$193 / —	LGA; 1151	DMI 3.0; PCIe 3.0	DDR4; 2133/1866 or DDR3L; 1333/1600 with ECC
Mobile workstation	4 (8)	Xeon E3 v5	1575Mv5	Iris Pro P580	3.0 GHz	3.9 GHz	350 MHz	1.1 GHz	8 MB	128 MB	45 W	Q1 2016	$1207 / —	BGA; 1440	DMI 3.0; PCIe 3.0	DDR4-2133; LPDDR3-1866; DDR3L-1600 with ECC
Mobile workstation	4 (8)	Xeon E3 v5	1545Mv5	Iris Pro P580	2.9 GHz	3.8 GHz	350 MHz	1.05 GHz	8 MB	128 MB	45 W	Q1 2016	$679 / —	BGA; 1440	DMI 3.0; PCIe 3.0	DDR4-2133; LPDDR3-1866; DDR3L-1600 with ECC
Mobile workstation	4 (8)	Xeon E3 v5	1535Mv5	HD P530	2.9 GHz	3.8 GHz	350 MHz	1.05 GHz	8 MB	—N/a	45 W	Q3 2015	$623 / —	BGA; 1440	DMI 3.0; PCIe 3.0	DDR4-2133; LPDDR3-1866; DDR3L-1600 with ECC
Mobile workstation	4 (8)	Xeon E3 v5	1505Mv5	HD P530	2.8 GHz	3.7 GHz	350 MHz	1.05 GHz	8 MB	—N/a	45 W	Q3 2015	$434 / —	BGA; 1440	DMI 3.0; PCIe 3.0	DDR4-2133; LPDDR3-1866; DDR3L-1600 with ECC
Embedded	4 (8)	Xeon E3 v5	1505Lv5	HD P530	2.0 GHz	2.8 GHz	350 MHz	1.0 GHz	8 MB	—N/a	25 W	Q4 2015	$433 / —	BGA; 1440	DMI 3.0; PCIe 3.0	DDR4-2133; LPDDR3-1866; DDR3L-1600 with ECC

=== Skylake-SP (14 nm) Scalable Performance ===
- Xeon Platinum supports up to eight sockets. Xeon Gold supports up to four sockets. Xeon Silver and Bronze support up to two sockets.
  - −M: 1536 GB RAM per socket instead of 768 GB RAM for non−M SKUs
  - −F: integrated OmniPath fabric
  - −T: High thermal-case and extended reliability
- Support for up to 12 DIMMs of DDR4 memory per CPU socket.
- Xeon Platinum, Gold 61XX, and Gold 5122 have two AVX-512 FMA units per core. Xeon Gold 51XX (except 5122), Silver, and Bronze have a single AVX-512 FMA unit per core.

==== Xeon Bronze and Silver (dual processor) ====
- Xeon Bronze 31XX has no HT or Turbo Boost support.
- Xeon Bronze 31XX supports DDR4-2133 MHz RAM. Xeon Silver 41XX supports DDR4-2400 MHz RAM.
- Xeon Bronze 31XX and Xeon Silver 41XX support two UPI links at 9.6 GT/s.

Model	sSpec number	Cores (threads)	Clock rate	Turbo Boost all-core/2.0 (/max. 3.0)	L2 cache	L3 cache	TDP	Socket	I/O bus	Memory	Release date	Part number(s)	Release price (USD)
Xeon Silver 4116	SR3HQ (M0)	12 (24)	2.1 GHz	2.4/3.0 GHz	12 × 1 MB	16.50 MB	85 W	LGA 3647	2 × 9.6 GT/s UPI	6 × DDR4-2400	11 July 2017	CD8067303567200; BX806734116	$1002 $1012
Xeon Silver 4116T	SR3MQ (M0)	12 (24)	2.1 GHz	2.4/3.0 GHz	12 × 1 MB	16.50 MB	85 W	LGA 3647	2 × 9.6 GT/s UPI	6 × DDR4-2400	Q3 2017	CD8067303645400	$1112
Xeon Silver 4114	SR3GK (U0)	10 (20)	2.2 GHz	2.5/3.0 GHz	10 × 1 MB	13.75 MB	85 W	LGA 3647	2 × 9.6 GT/s UPI	6 × DDR4-2400	11 July 2017	CD8067303561800; BX806734114	$694 $704
Xeon Silver 4114T	SR3MM (U0)	10 (20)	2.2 GHz	2.5/3.0 GHz	10 × 1 MB	13.75 MB	85 W	LGA 3647	2 × 9.6 GT/s UPI	6 × DDR4-2400	Q3 2017	CD8067303645300	$773
Xeon Silver 4112	SR3GN (U0)	4 (8)	2.6 GHz	2.9/3.0 GHz	4 × 1 MB	8.25 MB	85 W	LGA 3647	2 × 9.6 GT/s UPI	6 × DDR4-2400	11 July 2017	CD8067303562100; BX806734112	$473 $483
Xeon Silver 4110	SR3GH (U0)	8 (16)	2.1 GHz	2.4/3.0 GHz	8 × 1 MB	11.00 MB	85 W	LGA 3647	2 × 9.6 GT/s UPI	6 × DDR4-2400	11 July 2017	CD8067303561400; BX806734110	$501 $511
Xeon Silver 4109T	SR3GP (U0)	8 (16)	2 GHz	2.3/3.0 GHz	8 × 1 MB	11.00 MB	70 W	LGA 3647	2 × 9.6 GT/s UPI	6 × DDR4-2400	11 July 2017	CD8067303562200	$501
Xeon Silver 4108	SR3GJ (U0)	8 (16)	1.8 GHz	2.1/3.0 GHz	8 × 1 MB	11.00 MB	85 W	LGA 3647	2 × 9.6 GT/s UPI	6 × DDR4-2400	11 July 2017	CD8067303561500; BX806734108	$417 $427
Xeon Bronze 3106	SR3GL (U0)	8 (8)	1.7 GHz	N/A	8 × 1 MB	11.00 MB	85 W	LGA 3647	2 × 9.6 GT/s UPI	6 × DDR4-2133	11 July 2017	CD8067303561900; BX806733106	$306 $316
Xeon Bronze 3104	SR3GM (U0)	6 (6)	1.7 GHz	N/A	6 × 1 MB	8.25 MB	85 W	LGA 3647	2 × 9.6 GT/s UPI	6 × DDR4-2133	11 July 2017	CD8067303562000; BX806733104	$223 $213

==== Xeon Gold (quad processor) ====
- Xeon Gold 51XX and F SKUs has two UPIs at 10.4 GT/s. Xeon Gold 61XX has three UPIs at 10.4 GT/s.
- Xeon Gold 51XX support DDR4-2400 MHz RAM (except 5122). Xeon Gold 5122 and 61XX support DDR4-2666 MHz RAM.

Model	sSpec number	Cores (threads)	Clock rate	Turbo Boost all-core/2.0 (/max. 3.0)	L2 cache	L3 cache	TDP	Socket	I/O bus	Memory	Release date	Part number(s)	Release price (USD)
Xeon Gold 6161	SR3G7 (H0)	22 (44)	2.2 GHz	2.7/3.0GHz	22 × 1 MB	30.25 MB	165 W	LGA 3647	3 × 10.4 GT/s UPI	6 × DDR4-2666	2017	CD8067303532100	
Xeon Gold 6154	SR3J5 (H0)	18 (36)	3 GHz	3.7/3.7GHz	18 × 1 MB	24.75 MB	200 W	LGA 3647	3 × 10.4 GT/s UPI	6 × DDR4-2666	11 July 2017	CD8067303592700	$3543
Xeon Gold 6152	SR3B4 (H0)	22 (44)	2.1 GHz	2.8/3.7GHz	22 × 1 MB	30.25 MB	140 W	LGA 3647	3 × 10.4 GT/s UPI	6 × DDR4-2666	11 July 2017	CD8067303406000; BX806736152	$3655 $3661
Xeon Gold 6150	SR37K (H0)	18 (36)	2.7 GHz	3.4/3.7GHz	18 × 1 MB	24.75 MB	165 W	LGA 3647	3 × 10.4 GT/s UPI	6 × DDR4-2666	11 July 2017	CD8067303328000	$3358
Xeon Gold 6149		16 (32)	3.1 GHz		16 × 1 MB	MB		LGA 3647	3 × 10.4 GT/s UPI	6 × DDR4-2666			OEM
Xeon Gold 6148	SR3B6 (H0)	20 (40)	2.4 GHz	3.1/3.7GHz	20 × 1 MB	27.50 MB	150 W	LGA 3647	3 × 10.4 GT/s UPI	6 × DDR4-2666	11 July 2017	CD8067303406200; BX806736148	$3072 $3078
Xeon Gold 6148F	SR3KJ (H0)	20 (40)	2.4 GHz	3.1/3.7GHz	20 × 1 MB	27.50 MB	150 W	LGA 3647	2 × 10.4 GT/s UPI	6 × DDR4-2666	11 July 2017	CD8067303593800	$3227
Xeon Gold 6146	SR3MA (H0)	12 (24)	3.2 GHz	3.9/4.2GHz	12 × 1 MB	24.75 MB	165 W	LGA 3647	3 × 10.4 GT/s UPI	6 × DDR4-2666	11 July 2017	CD8067303657201	$3286
Xeon Gold 6145	SR3G4 (H0)	20 (40)	2 GHz	2.7/3.7GHz	20 × 1 MB	27.50 MB	145 W	LGA 3647	3 × 10.4 GT/s UPI	6 × DDR4-2666	2017	CD8067303528200	
Xeon Gold 6144	SR3MB (H0)	8 (16)	3.5 GHz	4.1/4.2GHz	8 × 1 MB	24.75 MB	150 W	LGA 3647	3 × 10.4 GT/s UPI	6 × DDR4-2666	Q3 2017	CD8067303657302	$2925
Xeon Gold 6142M	SR3B1 (H0)	16 (32)	2.6 GHz	3.3/3.7GHz	16 × 1 MB	22.00 MB	150 W	LGA 3647	3 × 10.4 GT/s UPI	6 × DDR4-2666	11 July 2017	CD8067303405700	$5949
Xeon Gold 6142F	SR3KH (H0)	16 (32)	2.6 GHz	3.3/3.7GHz	16 × 1 MB	22.00 MB	160 W	LGA 3647	2 × 10.4 GT/s UPI	6 × DDR4-2666	11 July 2017	CD8067303593700	$3101
Xeon Gold 6142	SR3AY (H0)	16 (32)	2.6 GHz	3.3/3.7GHz	16 × 1 MB	22.00 MB	150 W	LGA 3647	3 × 10.4 GT/s UPI	6 × DDR4-2666	11 July 2017	CD8067303405400; BX806736142	$2946 $2952
Xeon Gold 6140	SR3AX (H0)	18 (36)	2.3 GHz	3.0/3.7GHz	18 × 1 MB	24.75 MB	140 W	LGA 3647	3 × 10.4 GT/s UPI	6 × DDR4-2666	11 July 2017	CD8067303405200; BX806736140	$2445 $2451
Xeon Gold 6140M	SR3AZ (H0)	18 (36)	2.3 GHz	3.0/3.7GHz	18 × 1 MB	24.75 MB	140 W	LGA 3647	3 × 10.4 GT/s UPI	6 × DDR4-2666	11 July 2017	CD8067303405500	$5448
Xeon Gold 6138	SR3B5 (H0)	20 (40)	2 GHz	2.7/3.7GHz	20 × 1 MB	27.50 MB	125 W	LGA 3647	3 × 10.4 GT/s UPI	6 × DDR4-2666	11 July 2017	CD8067303406100; BX806736138	$2612 $2618
Xeon Gold 6138F	SR3KK (H0)	20 (40)	2 GHz	2.7/3.7GHz	20 × 1 MB	27.50 MB	135 W	LGA 3647	2 × 10.4 GT/s UPI	6 × DDR4-2666	11 July 2017	CD8067303593900	$2767
Xeon Gold 6138T	SR3J7 (H0)	20 (40)	2 GHz	2.7/3.7GHz	20 × 1 MB	27.50 MB	125 W	LGA 3647	3 × 10.4 GT/s UPI	6 × DDR4-2666	11 July 2017	CD8067303592900	$2742
Xeon Gold 6136	SR3B2 (H0)	12 (24)	3 GHz	3.6/3.7GHz	12 × 1 MB	24.75 MB	150 W	LGA 3647	3 × 10.4 GT/s UPI	6 × DDR4-2666	11 July 2017	CD8067303405800	$2460
Xeon Gold 6134	SR3AR (H0)	8 (16)	3.2 GHz	3.7/3.7GHz	8 × 1 MB	24.75 MB	130 W	LGA 3647	3 × 10.4 GT/s UPI	6 × DDR4-2666	11 July 2017	CD8067303330302; BX806736134	$2214 $2220
Xeon Gold 6134M	SR3AS (H0)	8 (16)	3.2 GHz	3.7/3.7GHz	8 × 1 MB	24.75 MB	130 W	LGA 3647	3 × 10.4 GT/s UPI	6 × DDR4-2666	11 July 2017	CD8067303330402	$5217
Xeon Gold 6132	SR3J3 (H0)	14 (28)	2.6 GHz	3.3/3.7GHz	14 × 1 MB	19.25 MB	140 W	LGA 3647	3 × 10.4 GT/s UPI	6 × DDR4-2666	11 July 2017	CD8067303592500	$2111
Xeon Gold 6130	SR3B9 (H0)	16 (32)	2.1 GHz	2.8/3.7GHz	16 × 1 MB	22.00 MB	125 W	LGA 3647	3 × 10.4 GT/s UPI	6 × DDR4-2666	11 July 2017	CD8067303409000; BX806736130	$1900
Xeon Gold 6130F	SR3KD (H0)	16 (32)	2.1 GHz	2.8/3.7GHz	16 × 1 MB	22.00 MB	125 W	LGA 3647	2 × 10.4 GT/s UPI	6 × DDR4-2666	11 July 2017	CD8067303593300	$2049
Xeon Gold 6130T	SR3J8 (H0)	16 (32)	2.1 GHz	2.8/3.7GHz	16 × 1 MB	22.00 MB	125 W	LGA 3647	3 × 10.4 GT/s UPI	6 × DDR4-2666	11 July 2017	CD8067303593000	$1988
Xeon Gold 6128	SR3J4 (H0)	6 (12)	3.4 GHz	3.7/3.7GHz	6 × 1 MB	19.25 MB	115 W	LGA 3647	3 × 10.4 GT/s UPI	6 × DDR4-2666	11 July 2017	CD8067303592600; BX806736128	$1691 $1697
Xeon Gold 6126	SR3B3 (H0)	12 (24)	2.6 GHz	3.3/3.7GHz	12 × 1 MB	19.25 MB	125 W	LGA 3647	3 × 10.4 GT/s UPI	6 × DDR4-2666	11 July 2017	CD8067303405900	$1776
Xeon Gold 6126F	SR3KE (H0)	12 (24)	2.6 GHz	3.3/3.7GHz	12 × 1 MB	19.25 MB	135 W	LGA 3647	2 × 10.4 GT/s UPI	6 × DDR4-2666	11 July 2017	CD8067303593400	$1931
Xeon Gold 6126T	SR3J9 (H0)	12 (24)	2.6 GHz	3.3/3.7GHz	12 × 1 MB	19.25 MB	125 W	LGA 3647	3 × 10.4 GT/s UPI	6 × DDR4-2666	11 July 2017	CD8067303593100	$1865
Xeon Gold 5122	SR3AT (H0)	4 (8)	3.6 GHz	3.7/3.7GHz	4 × 1 MB	16.50 MB	105 W	LGA 3647	2 × 10.4 GT/s UPI	6 × DDR4-2666	11 July 2017	CD8067303330702; BX806735122	$1221 $1227
Xeon Gold 5120	SR3GD (M0)	14 (28)	2.2 GHz	2.6/3.2GHz	14 × 1 MB	19.25 MB	105 W	LGA 3647	2 × 10.4 GT/s UPI	6 × DDR4-2400	11 July 2017	CD8067303535900; BX806735120	$1555 $1561
Xeon Gold 5120T	SR3GC (M0)	14 (28)	2.2 GHz	2.6/3.2GHz	14 × 1 MB	19.25 MB	105 W	LGA 3647	2 × 10.4 GT/s UPI	6 × DDR4-2400	11 July 2017	CD8067303535700	$1727
Xeon Gold 5119T	SR3MN (M0)	14 (28)	1.9 GHz	2.3/3.2GHz	14 × 1 MB	19.25 MB	85 W	LGA 3647	2 × 10.4 GT/s UPI	6 × DDR4-2400	11 July 2017	CD8067303567703	$1555
Xeon Gold 5118	SR3GF (M0)	12 (24)	2.3 GHz	2.7/3.2GHz	12 × 1 MB	16.50 MB	105 W	LGA 3647	2 × 10.4 GT/s UPI	6 × DDR4-2400	11 July 2017	CD8067303536100	$1273
Xeon Gold 5117	SR37S (M0)	14 (28)	2 GHz	2.3/2.8GHz	14 × 1 MB	19.25 MB	105 W	LGA 3647	2 × 10.4 GT/s UPI	6 × DDR4-2400	11 July 2017	CD8067303317801	$1286
Xeon Gold 5117F	SR3KM (M0)	14 (28)	2 GHz	2.3/2.8GHz	14 × 1 MB	19.25 MB	113 W	LGA 3647	2 × 10.4 GT/s UPI	6 × DDR4-2400	11 July 2017	CD8067303680501	
Xeon Gold 5115	SR3GB (M0)	10 (20)	2.4 GHz	2.8/3.2GHz	10 × 1 MB	13.75 MB	85 W	LGA 3647	2 × 10.4 GT/s UPI	6 × DDR4-2400	11 July 2017	CD8067303535601	$1221

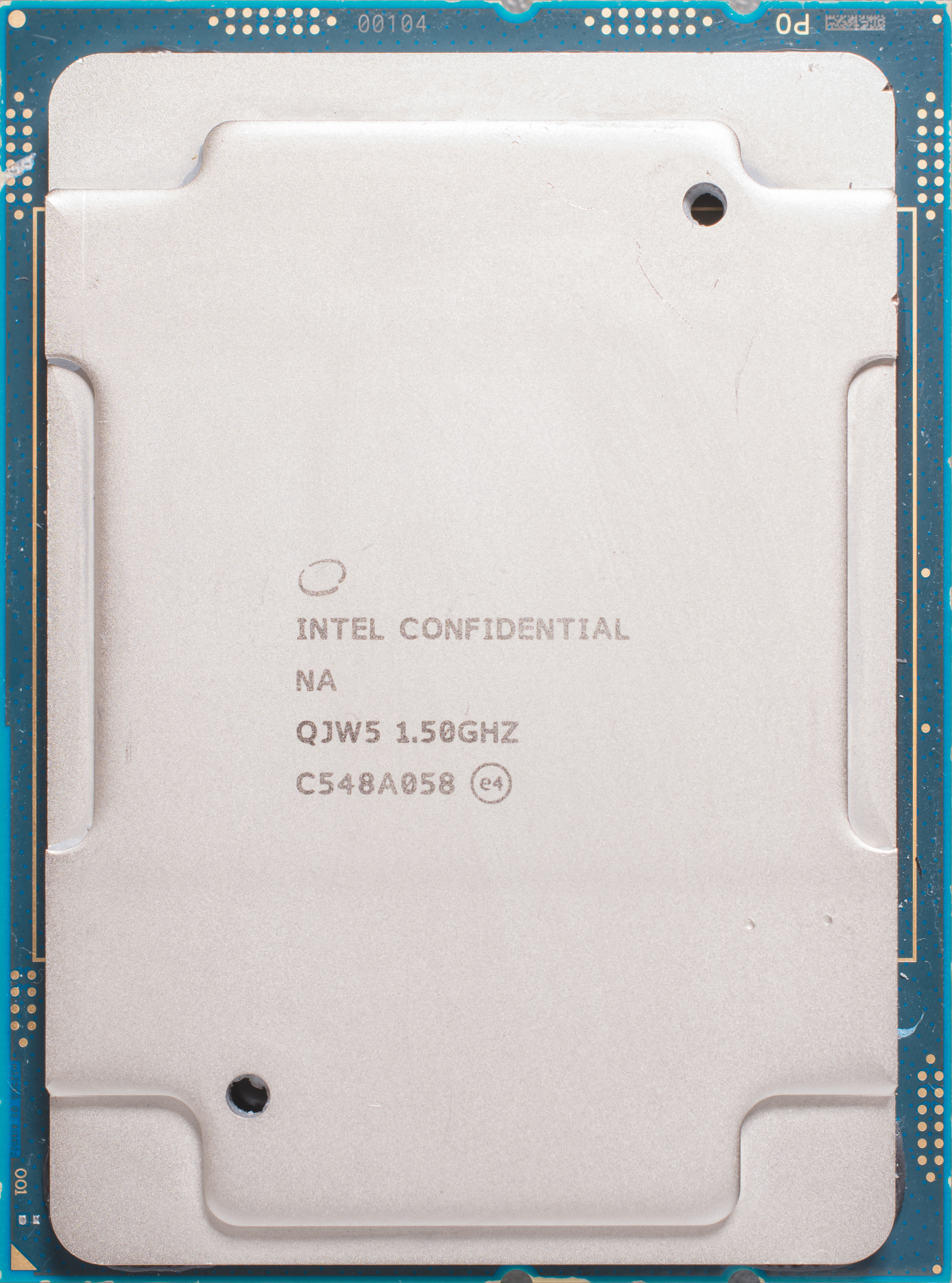
Intel Skylake Xeon gold processor

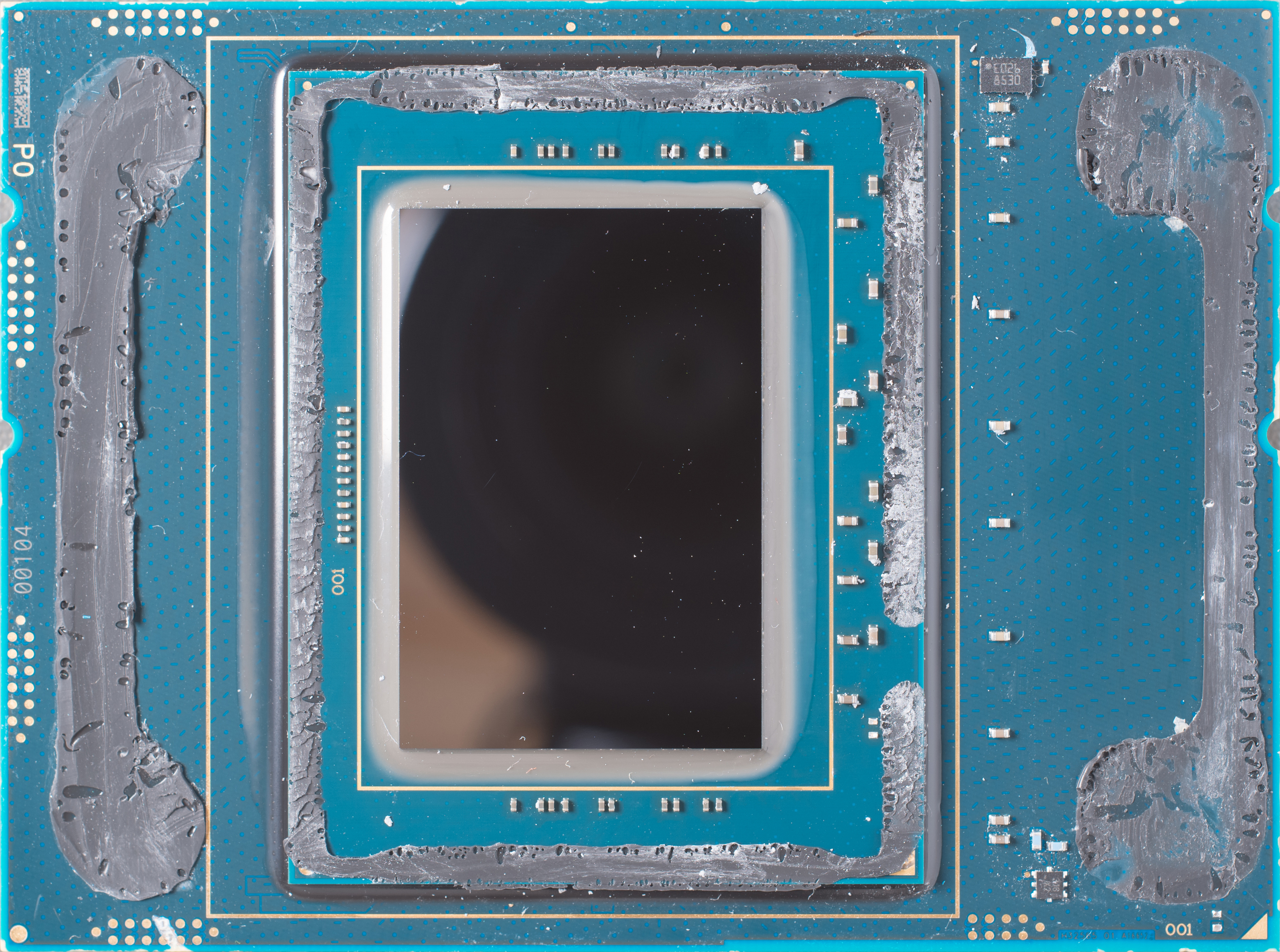
Intel Skylake Xeon gold processor, delidded

Die shot

==== Xeon Platinum (octal processor) ====
- Xeon Platinum non-F SKUs have three UPIs at 10.4 GT/s. Xeon Platinum F-SKUs have two UPIs at 10.4 GT/s.
- Xeon Platinum supports DDR4-2666 MHz RAM.

Model	sSpec number	Cores (threads)	Clock rate	Turbo Boost all-core/2.0 (/max. 3.0)	L2 cache	L3 cache	TDP	Socket	I/O bus	Memory	Release date	Part number(s)	Release price (USD)
Xeon Platinum 8180	SR377 (H0)	28 (56)	2.5 GHz	3.2/3.8 GHz	28 × 1 MB	38.50 MB	205 W	LGA 3647	3 × 10.4 GT/s UPI	6 × DDR4-2666	11 July 2017	CD8067303314400	$10,009
Xeon Platinum 8180M	SR37T (H0)	28 (56)	2.5 GHz	3.2/3.8 GHz	28 × 1 MB	38.50 MB	205 W	LGA 3647	3 × 10.4 GT/s UPI	6 × DDR4-2666	11 July 2017	CD8067303192101	$13,011
Xeon Platinum 8176	SR37A (H0)	28 (56)	2.1 GHz	2.8/3.8 GHz	28 × 1 MB	38.50 MB	165 W	LGA 3647	3 × 10.4 GT/s UPI	6 × DDR4-2666	11 July 2017	CD8067303314700	$8790
Xeon Platinum 8176F	SR3MK (H0)	28 (56)	2.1 GHz	2.8/3.8 GHz	28 × 1 MB	38.50 MB	173 W	LGA 3647	2 × 10.4 GT/s UPI	6 × DDR4-2666	Q3, 2017	CD8067303694600	$8874
Xeon Platinum 8176M	SR37U (H0)	28 (56)	2.1 GHz	2.8/3.8 GHz	28 × 1 MB	38.50 MB	165 W	LGA 3647	3 × 10.4 GT/s UPI	6 × DDR4-2666	11 July 2017	CD8067303133605	$11,722
Xeon Platinum 8173M	SR37Q (H0)	28 (56)	2 GHz	2.7/3.5 GHz	28 × 1 MB	38.50 MB	165 W	LGA 3647	3 × 10.4 GT/s UPI	6 × DDR4-2666	2017	CD8067303172400	
Xeon Platinum 8170	SR37H (H0)	26 (52)	2.1 GHz	2.8/3.7 GHz	26 × 1 MB	35.75 MB	165 W	LGA 3647	3 × 10.4 GT/s UPI	6 × DDR4-2666	11 July 2017	CD8067303327601; BX806738170	$7405 $7411
Xeon Platinum 8170M	SR3BD (H0)	26 (52)	2.1 GHz	2.8/3.7 GHz	26 × 1 MB	35.75 MB	165 W	LGA 3647	3 × 10.4 GT/s UPI	6 × DDR4-2666	11 July 2017	CD8067303319201	$10,409
Xeon Platinum 8168	SR37J (H0)	24 (48)	2.7 GHz	3.4/3.7 GHz	24 × 1 MB	33.00 MB	205 W	LGA 3647	3 × 10.4 GT/s UPI	6 × DDR4-2666	11 July 2017	CD8067303327701	$5890
Xeon Platinum 8167M	SR3A0 (H0)	26 (52)	2 GHz	2.4/2.4 GHz	26 × 1 MB	35.75 MB	165 W	LGA 3647	3 × 10.4 GT/s UPI	6 × DDR4-2666	2017	CD8067303180701	
Xeon Platinum 8164	SR3BB (H0)	26 (52)	2 GHz	2.7/3.7 GHz	26 × 1 MB	35.75 MB	150 W	LGA 3647	3 × 10.4 GT/s UPI	6 × DDR4-2666	11 July 2017	CD8067303408800; BX806738164	$6114 $6120
Xeon Platinum 8163	SR3G1 (H0)	24 (48)	2.4 GHz	2.7/3.1 GHz	24 × 1 MB	33.00 MB	165 W	LGA 3647	3 × 10.4 GT/s UPI	6 × DDR4-2666	2017	CD8067303527200	
Xeon Platinum 8160	SR3B0 (H0)	24 (48)	2.1 GHz	2.8/3.7 GHz	24 × 1 MB	33.00 MB	150 W	LGA 3647	3 × 10.4 GT/s UPI	6 × DDR4-2666	11 July 2017	CD8067303405600; BX806738160	$4702 $4708
Xeon Platinum 8160F	SR3B8 (H0)	24 (48)	2.1 GHz	2.8/3.7 GHz	24 × 1 MB	33.00 MB	160 W	LGA 3647	2 × 10.4 GT/s UPI	6 × DDR4-2666	11 July 2017	CD8067303406600	$4856
Xeon Platinum 8160M	SR3B8 (H0)	24 (48)	2.1 GHz	2.8/3.7 GHz	24 × 1 MB	33.00 MB	150 W	LGA 3647	3 × 10.4 GT/s UPI	6 × DDR4-2666	11 July 2017	CD8067303406600	$7704
Xeon Platinum 8160T	SR3J6 (H0)	24 (48)	2.1 GHz	2.8/3.7 GHz	24 × 1 MB	33.00 MB	150 W	LGA 3647	3 × 10.4 GT/s UPI	6 × DDR4-2666	11 July 2017	CD8067303592800	$4936
Xeon Platinum 8158	SR3B7 (H0)	12 (24)	3 GHz	2.7/3.7 GHz	12 × 1 MB	24.75 MB	150 W	LGA 3647	3 × 10.4 GT/s UPI	6 × DDR4-2666	11 July 2017	CD8067303406500	$7007
Xeon Platinum 8156	SR3AV (H0)	4 (8)	3.6 GHz	3.3/3.7 GHz	4 × 1 MB	16.50 MB	105 W	LGA 3647	3 × 10.4 GT/s UPI	6 × DDR4-2666	11 July 2017	CD8067303368800	$7007
Xeon Platinum 8153	SR3BA (H0)	16 (32)	2 GHz	2.3/2.8 GHz	16 × 1 MB	22.00 MB	125 W	LGA 3647	3 × 10.4 GT/s QPI	6 × DDR4-2666	11 July 2017	CD8067303408900	$3115

== See also ==
- List of Intel CPU microarchitectures

Atom (ULV)		Node name	Pentium/Core						
Microarch.	Step	Node name	Microarch.	Step					
		600 nm	P6	Pentium Pro (133 MHz)					
		500 nm	P6	Pentium Pro (150 MHz)					
		350 nm	P6	Pentium Pro (166–200 MHz)					
		350 nm	P6	Klamath					
		250 nm	P6	Deschutes					
		250 nm	P6	Katmai	NetBurst				
		180 nm	P6	Coppermine	Willamette				
		130 nm	P6	Tualatin	Northwood				
		130 nm	Pentium M (P6)	Banias	Northwood		NetBurst(HT)		NetBurst(×2)
		90 nm	Pentium M (P6)	Dothan	Prescott	⇨	Prescott‑2M	⇨	Smithfield
		90 nm	Pentium M (P6)	Dothan	~~Tejas~~	→	⇩	→	~~Cedarmill (Tejas)~~
		65 nm	Pentium M (P6)	Yonah	~~Nehalem (NetBurst)~~		Cedar Mill	⇨	Presler
		65 nm	Core	Merom	4 cores on mainstream desktop, DDR3 introduced				
Bonnell	Bonnell	45 nm	Core	Penryn					
Bonnell	Bonnell	45 nm	Nehalem	Nehalem	HT reintroduced, integrated MC, PCH; L3-cache introduced, 256 KB L2-cache/core				
Bonnell	Saltwell	32 nm	Nehalem	Westmere	Introduced GPU on same package and AES-NI				
Bonnell	Saltwell	32 nm	Sandy Bridge	Sandy Bridge	On-die ring bus, no more non-UEFI motherboards				
Silvermont	Silvermont	22 nm	Sandy Bridge	Ivy Bridge					
Silvermont	Silvermont	22 nm	Haswell	Haswell	Fully integrated voltage regulator				
Silvermont	Airmont	14 nm	Haswell	Broadwell					
Silvermont	Airmont	14 nm	Skylake	Skylake	DDR4 introduced on mainstream desktop				
Goldmont		14 nm	Skylake	Kaby Lake					
Goldmont		14 nm	Skylake	Coffee Lake	6 cores on mainstream desktop				
Goldmont		14 nm	Skylake	Amber Lake	Mobile-only				
Goldmont Plus		14 nm	Skylake	Whiskey Lake	Mobile-only				
Goldmont Plus		14 nm	Skylake	Coffee Lake Refresh	8 cores on mainstream desktop				
Goldmont Plus		14 nm	Skylake	Comet Lake	10 cores on mainstream desktop				
Goldmont Plus		14 nm	Sunny Cove	Cypress Cove (Rocket Lake)	Backported Sunny Cove microarchitecture for 14 nm				
Tremont		10 nm	Skylake	Palm Cove (Cannon Lake)	Mobile-only				
Tremont		10 nm	Sunny Cove	Sunny Cove (Ice Lake)	512 KB L2-cache/core				
Tremont		10 nm	Sunny Cove	Willow Cove (Tiger Lake)	X^{e} graphics engine				
Gracemont		Intel 7 (10 nm ESF)	Golden Cove	Golden Cove (Alder Lake)	Hybrid, DDR5, PCIe 5.0				
Gracemont		Intel 7 (10 nm ESF)	Golden Cove	Raptor Cove (Raptor Lake)					
Crestmont		Intel 4	Redwood Cove	Meteor Lake	Mobile-only; NPU, chiplet architecture				
Crestmont		Intel 3	Redwood Cove	Arrow Lake-U					
Skymont		TSMC N3B	Lion Cove	Lunar Lake	Low power mobile only (9–30 W)				
Skymont		TSMC N3B	Lion Cove	Arrow Lake					
Darkmont		Intel 18A	Cougar Cove	Panther Lake					
Arctic Wolf		Intel 18A and/or TSMC N2P	Coyote Cove	Nova Lake					
