= Transactional Synchronization Extensions =

Instruction set architecture extension

Transactional Synchronization Extensions (TSX), also called Transactional Synchronization Extensions New Instructions (TSX-NI), is an extension to the x86 instruction set architecture (ISA) that adds hardware transactional memory support, speeding up execution of multi-threaded software through lock elision. According to different benchmarks, TSX/TSX-NI can provide around 40% faster applications execution in specific workloads, and 4–5 times more database transactions per second (TPS).

TSX/TSX-NI was documented by Intel in February 2012, and debuted in June 2013 on selected Intel microprocessors based on the Haswell microarchitecture. Haswell processors below 45xx as well as R-series and K-series (with unlocked multiplier) SKUs do not support TSX/TSX-NI. In August 2014, Intel announced a bug in the TSX/TSX-NI implementation on current steppings of Haswell, Haswell-E, Haswell-EP and early Broadwell CPUs, which resulted in disabling the TSX/TSX-NI feature on affected CPUs via a microcode update.

In 2016, a side-channel timing attack was found by abusing the way TSX/TSX-NI handles transactional faults (i.e. page faults) in order to break kernel address space layout randomization (KASLR) on all major operating systems. In 2021, Intel released a microcode update that disabled the TSX/TSX-NI feature on CPU generations from Skylake to Coffee Lake, as a mitigation for discovered security issues.

While TSX/TSX-NI is not supported anymore in desktop-class processors, it remains supported in the Xeon line of processors (at least on specific models, as of the 6th generation).

Support for TSX/TSX-NI emulation is provided as part of the Intel Software Development Emulator. There is also experimental support for TSX/TSX-NI emulation in a QEMU fork.

== Features ==
TSX/TSX-NI provides two software interfaces for designating code regions for transactional execution. Hardware Lock Elision (HLE) is an instruction prefix-based interface designed to be backward compatible with processors without TSX/TSX-NI support. Restricted Transactional Memory (RTM) is a new instruction set interface that provides greater flexibility for programmers.

TSX/TSX-NI enables optimistic execution of transactional code regions. The hardware monitors multiple threads for conflicting memory accesses, while aborting and rolling back transactions that cannot be successfully completed. Mechanisms are provided for software to detect and handle failed transactions.

=== Hardware Lock Elision ===
Hardware Lock Elision (HLE) adds two new instruction prefixes, XACQUIRE and XRELEASE. These two prefixes reuse the opcodes of the existing REPNE / REPE prefixes (F2H / F3H). On processors that do not support HLE, REPNE / REPE prefixes are ignored on instructions for which the XACQUIRE / XRELEASE are valid, thus enabling backward compatibility.

The XACQUIRE prefix hint can only be used with the following instructions with an explicit LOCK prefix: ADD, ADC, AND, BTC, BTR, BTS, CMPXCHG, CMPXCHG8B, DEC, INC, NEG, NOT, OR, SBB, SUB, XOR, XADD, and XCHG. The XCHG instruction can be used without the LOCK prefix as well.

The XRELEASE prefix hint can be used both with the instructions listed above, and with the MOV mem, reg and MOV mem, imm instructions.

HLE allows optimistic execution of a critical section by skipping the write to a lock, so that the lock appears to be free to other threads. A failed transaction results in execution restarting from the XACQUIRE-prefixed instruction, but treating the instruction as if the XACQUIRE prefix were not present.

In other words, lock elision through transactional execution uses memory transactions as a fast path where possible, while the slow (fallback) path is still a normal lock.

=== Restricted Transactional Memory ===
Restricted Transactional Memory (RTM) is an alternative implementation to HLE which gives the programmer the flexibility to specify a fallback code path that is executed when a transaction cannot be successfully executed. Unlike HLE, RTM is not backward compatible with processors that do not support it. For backward compatibility, programs are required to detect support for RTM in the CPU before using the new instructions.

RTM adds three new instructions: XBEGIN, XEND and XABORT. The XBEGIN and XEND instructions mark the start and the end of a transactional code region; the XABORT instruction explicitly aborts a transaction. Transaction failure redirects the processor to the fallback code path specified by the XBEGIN instruction, with the abort status returned in the EAX register.

| EAX register bit position | Meaning |
|---|---|
| 0 | Set if abort caused by XABORT instruction. |
| 1 | If set, the transaction may succeed on a retry. This bit is always clear if bit 0 is set. |
| 2 | Set if another logical processor conflicted with a memory address that was part of the transaction that aborted. |
| 3 | Set if an internal buffer overflowed. |
| 4 | Set if debug breakpoint was hit. |
| 5 | Set if an abort occurred during execution of a nested transaction. |
| 23:6 | Reserved. |
| 31:24 | XABORT argument (only valid if bit 0 set, otherwise reserved). |

=== XTEST instruction ===
TSX/TSX-NI provides a new XTEST instruction that returns whether the processor is executing a transactional region. This instruction is supported by the processor if it supports HLE or RTM or both.

=== TSX Suspend Load Address Tracking ===
TSX/TSX-NI Suspend Load Address Tracking (TSXLDTRK) is an instruction set extension that allows to temporarily disable tracking loads from memory in a section of code within a transactional region. This feature extends HLE and RTM, and its support in the processor must be detected separately.

TSXLDTRK introduces two new instructions, XSUSLDTRK and XRESLDTRK, for suspending and resuming load address tracking, respectively. While the tracking is suspended, any loads from memory will not be added to the transaction read set. This means that, unless these memory locations were added to the transaction read or write sets outside the suspend region, writes at these locations by other threads will not cause transaction abort. Suspending load address tracking for a portion of code within a transactional region allows to reduce the amount of memory that needs to be tracked for read-write conflicts and therefore increase the probability of successful commit of the transaction.

== Implementation ==
Intel's TSX/TSX-NI specification describes how the transactional memory is exposed to programmers, but withholds details on the actual transactional memory implementation. Intel specifies in its developer's and optimization manuals that Haswell maintains both read-sets and write-sets at the granularity of a cache line, tracking addresses in the L1 data cache of the processor. Intel also states that data conflicts are detected through the cache coherence protocol.

Haswell's L1 data cache has an associativity of eight. This means that in this implementation, a transactional execution that writes to nine distinct locations mapping to the same cache set will abort. However, due to micro-architectural implementations, this does not mean that fewer accesses to the same set are guaranteed to never abort. Additionally, in CPU configurations with Hyper-Threading Technology, the L1 cache is shared between the two threads on the same core, so operations in a sibling logical processor of the same core can cause evictions.

Independent research points into Haswell's transactional memory most likely being a deferred update system using the per-core caches for transactional data and register checkpoints. In other words, Haswell is more likely to use the cache-based transactional memory system, as it is a much less risky implementation choice. On the other hand, Intel's Skylake or later may combine this cache-based approach with memory ordering buffer (MOB) for the same purpose, possibly also providing multi-versioned transactional memory that is more amenable to speculative multithreading.

== History and bugs ==
=== Haswell and Broadwell bug (2014) ===
In August 2014, Intel announced that a bug exists in the TSX/TSX-NI implementation on Haswell, Haswell-E, Haswell-EP and early Broadwell CPUs, which resulted in disabling the TSX/TSX-NI feature on affected CPUs via a microcode update. The bug was fixed in F-0 steppings of the vPro-enabled Core M-5Y70 Broadwell CPU in November 2014.

The bug was found and then reported during a diploma thesis in the School of Electrical and Computer Engineering of the National Technical University of Athens.

=== Skylake bug (2018) ===
In October 2018, Intel disclosed a TSX/TSX-NI memory ordering issue found in some Skylake processors. As a result of a microcode update, HLE support was disabled in the affected CPUs, and RTM was mitigated by sacrificing one performance counter when used outside of Intel SGX mode or System Management Mode (SMM). System software would have to either effectively disable RTM or update performance monitoring tools not to use the affected performance counter.

=== TAA vulnerability (2021) ===
In June 2021, Intel published a microcode update that further disables TSX/TSX-NI on various Xeon and Core processor models from Skylake through Coffee Lake and Whiskey Lake as a mitigation for TSX Asynchronous Abort (TAA) vulnerability. Earlier mitigation for memory ordering issue was removed. By default, with the updated microcode, the processor would still indicate support for RTM but would always abort the transaction. System software is able to detect this mode of operation and mask support for TSX/TSX-NI from the CPUID instruction, preventing detection of TSX/TSX-NI by applications. System software may also enable the "Unsupported Software Development Mode", where RTM is fully active, but in this case RTM usage may be subject to the issues described earlier, and therefore this mode should not be enabled on production systems. On some systems RTM can't be re-enabled when SGX is active. HLE is always disabled.

=== Current status ===
According to Intel 64 and IA-32 Architectures Software Developer's Manual from May 2020, Volume 1, Chapter 2.5 Intel Instruction Set Architecture And Features Removed, HLE has been removed from Intel products released in 2019 and later. RTM is not documented as removed. However, Intel 10th generation Comet Lake and Ice Lake client processors, which were released in 2020, do not support TSX/TSX-NI, including both HLE and RTM. Engineering versions of Comet Lake processors were still retaining TSX/TSX-NI support.

In Intel Architecture Instruction Set Extensions Programming Reference revision 41 from October 2020, a new TSXLDTRK instruction set extension was documented. It was first included in Sapphire Rapids processors released in January 2023.

== See also ==
- Advanced Synchronization Facility – AMD's competing technology
