= Brutus (Norwegian band) =

Norwegian hard rock band

- Origin: Oslo, Norway
- Genres: Hard rock, psychedelic rock, blues rock, stoner rock
- Years active: 2008–present
- Labels: Svart Records; Transubstans Records
- Members: Karl Johan Forsberg; Kim Molander; Christian Hellqvist; Nils Joakim Stenby; Knut-Ole Mathisen
- Website: Facebook

Brutus is a Norwegian hard rock band from Oslo, Norway formed in 2007. Brutus has a heavy groove based on 1970s blues-oriented riff rock, in the vein of Black Sabbath, Grand Funk Railroad, Blue Cheer and Pentagram, among others.

== Formation ==
Brutus formed in 2007, when Johan Forsberg, Christian "Krille" Hellqvist and Knut-Ole Mathisen got together to start a band. Mathisen was originally bassplayer, but shifted to drums when a drummer could not be found. The band solidified by 2008 when they found second guitarist Kim Molander. After seeing a concert with short lived band The Ritual, Hellqvist was so amused with charismatic singer Joakim Stenby that he hunted him down later that same night, threatening him to sing in the band. He said yes, and the lineup was complete. The band recorded their first demo. later that year (2008)

In the summer of 2009 Brutus went on to record in Gothenburg. At legendary Music-A-Matic Studios. (Hellacopters, Sator, Soundtrack Of Our Lives and more), with producer and engineer Henryk Lipp and Micke Nilsson. And early in 2010 the debut album was released on the Swedish label Transubstans Records. At the same time Svart Records released their debut on LP, and it sold out in only a couple of months. Brutus followed up the release with some small tours in Germany, England, Norway and Sweden. Svart Records released a 2nd press of the debut LP, which also sold out within few months.

In 2011 Brutus released a split 12" EP with Swedish band The Graviators, also on Transubstans Records.

In 2013 the band signed for Svart Record. Later that year Behind the Mountains was released. According to the band, Behind the Mountains was recorded in various parts over a long period. And it took almost 2 years to finish the album. The songs were recorded in Subsonic Society studios in Oslo. The same studio that was used for the split EP with The Graviators. For mastering and mixing they once again went to Music-a-Matic studios (Micke Nilson and Henryk Lipp) in Gothenburg. First 7" single from the album was the song "Personal Riot".

In April 2016, through Svart Records the band is releasing "Wandering Blind" full-length album.

== Members ==
- Johan Forsberg – guitar
- Kim Molander – guitar
- Christian "Krille" Hellqvist – bass
- Nils Joakim Stenby – vocals
- Knut-Ole Mathisen – drums

== Discography ==
=== Studio albums ===
Year	Album details	
2010	Brutus: Released: April 16, 2010; Label: Svart Records LP; Label: Transubstans Records CD	—
2013	Behind the Mountains: Released: June 14, 2013; Label: Svart Records	—
2016	Wandering Blind: Released: April, 2016; Label: Svart Records	—

=== EPs and singles ===
Year	Album details	
2013	Personal riot / Be Good and Be Kind: Released: 2013; Label: Svart Records	—
2014	Big Fat Boogie / Out of Focus: Released: 2014; Label: Svart Records	—

=== Splits ===
Year	Album details
2003	10" split with The Graviators: Released: September 16, 2011; Label: Transubstans Records

=== Demos ===
Year	Album details		
Year	Album details	2008	Demo 2008: Released: 2008; Label: Hellhound
