= Behind the Mountains (album) =

Studio album by Brutus
- Released: 14 June 2013
- Genre: Hard rock, psychedelic rock, doom rock, blues rock
- Length: 45:00 Behind the Mountains (2013)

Behind the Mountains is the second full-length studio album by Norwegian hard rock, heavy blues rock band Brutus. It was released on 14 June 2013 by Svart Records. The Japanese version contains the bonus track, "Be Good and Be Kind", originally by Tin House.

== Track listing ==
- All songs written by Brutus.
1. "The Witches Remains " - 4:58
2. "Personal Riot" - 3:54
3. "Big Fat Boogie" - 3:43
4. "Blue Pills" - 6:11
5. "Square Headed Dog" - 4:39
6. "Mystery Machine" - 3:48
7. "Crystal Parrot" - 4:13
8. "Reflections" - 6:56
9. "Can't Help Wondering Why" - 6:41
10. "Be Good and Be Kind" (Tin House cover) Japan version only bonus track) - 3:46

== Personnel ==
=== Brutus ===
- Karl Johan Forsberg: Guitars
- Kim Molander: Guitars
- Christian "Krille" Hellqvist: Bass
- Nils Joakim Stenby: Vocals
- Knut-Ole Mathisen: Drums, Percussion

=== Additional musicians ===
- Gustaf Gimstedt: Electronic organ, Korg MS-20
- Per Riihiaho: Harmonica
