= Decimus Junius Brutus =

Decimus Junius Brutus may refer to:

- Decimus Junius Brutus was consul in 325 BC
- Decimus Junius Brutus was consul in 292 BC; he is best known for introducing gladiatorial games to Rome in 264 BC
- Decimus Junius Brutus Callaicus (180 BC – 113 BC), led several armies during the Roman conquest of Iberia in the 2nd century BC
- Decimus Junius Brutus (consul 77 BC), consul in 77 BC
- Decimus Junius Brutus Albinus (died 43 BC), conspirator in the assassination of Julius Caesar, 1st century BC
