= AI Bridging Cloud Infrastructure =

- Active: Expected to be operational in 1Q 2018
- Sponsors: Fujitsu
- Operators: National Institute of Advanced Industrial Science and Technology
- Location: University of Tokyo
- Architecture: 2176 Intel Xeon Gold; 4352 Nvidia Tesla V100
- Power: 3 MW
- Speed: 550 petaFLOPS FP16; 37 petaFLOPS FP64
- Cost: ¥19.5 billion

AI Bridging Cloud Infrastructure (ABCI) is a planned supercomputer being built at the University of Tokyo for use in artificial intelligence, machine learning, and deep learning. It is being built by Japan's National Institute of Advanced Industrial Science and Technology. ABCI is expected to be completed in first quarter 2018 with a planned performance of 130 petaFLOPS. Power consumption is targeting 3 megawatts, and a planned power usage effectiveness of 1.1. If performance meets expectations, ABCI would be the second most powerful supercomputer built, surpassing the current leader Sunway TaihuLight's 93 petaflops. But still behind the Summit supercomputer.

== History ==
In November 2014 it was announced that a 160 petaFLOPS system will be built for ¥19.5 billion (US$172.4 million – US$231.8 million), with construction to begin in 2017.

In October 2017 Fujitsu got the contract to build a 37 petaFLOPS system for US$44.3 million.

== Design ==
The design of the ABCI is to be focused on low precision floating point, big data, and artificial intelligence applications; rather than Linpack performance.

== Projects ==
The ABCI is planned to be available to Japanese corporations, small businesses, and researchers; reducing their dependence on foreign cloud computing providers such as Microsoft and Google.
