= Brutus cluster =

Computer network at the ETH Zurich university in Switzerland

Brutus is the central high-performance cluster of ETH Zurich. It was introduced to the public in May 2008. A new computing cluster called EULER has been announced and opened to the public in May 2014.

== Processors ==
Brutus is a heterogeneous system containing 11 different kinds of compute nodes:

Standard nodes

- 120 nodes with four 12-core AMD Opteron 6174 CPUs and 64 GB of RAM (5760 cores)
- 24 nodes with two 12-core AMD Opteron 6174 CPUs and 32 GB of RAM (576 cores)
- 410 nodes with four quad-core AMD Opteron 8380 CPUs and 32 GB of RAM (6560 cores)
- 80 nodes with four quad-core AMD Opteron 8384 CPUs and 32 GB of RAM (1280 cores)

Large-memory (fat) nodes

- 6 nodes with four 8-core Intel Xeon E7-8837 CPUs and 1024 GB of RAM (192 cores) — NEW!
- 80 nodes with four 12-core AMD Opteron 6174 CPUs and 256 GB of RAM (3840 cores)
- 10 nodes with four quad-core AMD Opteron 8380 CPUs and 128 GB of RAM (160 cores)

GPU nodes

- 18 nodes with two 12-core AMD Opteron 6174 CPUs, 32 GB of RAM and 2 Nvidia Fermi C2050 GPUs (432 cores + 36 GPUs)
- 2 nodes with two 6-core AMD Opteron 2435 CPUs, 32 GB of RAM and 6 Nvidia Tesla C1060 GPUs (24 cores + 12 GPUs)
- 2 nodes with two 6-core AMD Opteron 2435 CPUs, 32 GB of RAM and various Nvidia and AMD GPUs (24 cores + 2 GPUs)

Legacy nodes

- 256 nodes with two dual-core AMD Opteron 2220 CPUs and 16 GB of RAM (1024 cores)

In total Brutus contains 19,872 cores, plus a few hundreds in the cluster's file servers, login nodes and management nodes.

The peak performance of Brutus is slightly over 200 teraflops (200 trillion floating-point operations per second).

== Networking ==
- All nodes are connected to the cluster's Gigabit Ethernet backbone
- All nodes (except those with Opteron 2220 CPUs) are connected to a high-speed InfiniBand QDR network

== Applications ==
Thanks to its heterogeneous nature, Brutus can tackle a wide range of applications:

- Serial and embarrassingly parallel computations
- Distributed-memory computations (MPI using MVAPICH2)
- Shared-memory, multithreaded applications (OpenMP) up to 1024 GB of memory and/or 48 threads
- Third-party (commercial) applications

== Trivia ==
- Brutus was ranked the 88th fastest computer in the world in November 2009 (top500.org). Since then, its peak performance has increased three-fold (from 65 to 200 TF).
- It was then the most energy efficient general purpose supercomputer in the world (Heise.de)
- It successor, EULER, was ranked the 255th fastest computer in the world in June 2014
