= Speculative Store Bypass =

Processor security vulnerability

CVE-2018-3639
- CVSS 3.x score: 5.5
- CVSS 3.x vector: CVSS:3.1/AV:L/AC:L/PR:L/UI:N/S:U/C:H/I:N/A:N
- Date of public disclosure: May 21, 2018; 8 years ago
- Discoverer: Microsoft Security Response Center, Google Project Zero
- Affected hardware: Intel, AMD, and ARM processors

Speculative Store Bypass (SSB) (CVE-2018-3639) is the name given to a hardware security vulnerability and its exploitation that takes advantage of speculative execution in a similar way to the Meltdown and Spectre security vulnerabilities. It affects the ARM, AMD and Intel families of processors. It was discovered by researchers at Microsoft Security Response Center and Google Project Zero (GPZ). After being leaked on 3 May 2018 as part of a group of eight additional Spectre-class flaws provisionally named Spectre-NG, it was first disclosed to the public as "Variant 4" on 21 May 2018, alongside a related speculative execution vulnerability designated "Variant 3a".

== Details ==
Speculative execution exploit Variant 4, is referred to as Speculative Store Bypass (SSB), and has been assigned CVE-2018-3639. SSB is named Variant 4, but it is the fifth variant in the Spectre-Meltdown class of vulnerabilities.

Steps involved in exploit:

1. "Slowly" store a value at a memory location
2. "Quickly" load that value from that memory location
3. Utilize the value that was just read to disrupt the cache in a detectable way

== Impact and mitigation ==
Intel claims that web browsers that are already patched to mitigate Spectre Variants 1 and 2 are partially protected against Variant 4. Intel said in a statement that the likelihood of end users being affected was "low" and that not all protections would be on by default due to some impact on performance. The Chrome JavaScript team confirmed that effective mitigation of Variant 4 in software is infeasible, in part due to performance impact.

Intel is planning to address Variant 4 by releasing a microcode patch that creates a new hardware flag named Speculative Store Bypass Disable (SSBD). A stable microcode patch is yet to be delivered, with Intel suggesting that the patch will be ready "in the coming weeks". Many operating system vendors will be releasing software updates to assist with mitigating Variant 4; however, microcode/firmware updates are required for the software updates to have an effect.

== Speculative execution exploit variants ==
Summary of speculative execution variants
Vulnerability	CVE	Exploit name	Public vulnerability name	CVSS v2.0	CVSS v3.0
Spectre	2017-5753	Variant 1	Bounds Check Bypass (BCB)	4.7	5.6
Spectre	2017-5715	Variant 2	Branch Target Injection (BTI)	4.7	5.6
Meltdown	2017-5754	Variant 3	Rogue Data Cache Load (RDCL)	4.7	5.6
Spectre-NG	2018-3640	Variant 3a	Rogue System Register Read (RSRR)	4.7	5.6
Spectre-NG	2018-3639	Variant 4	Speculative Store Bypass (SSB)	4.9	5.5
Spectre-NG	2018-3665		Lazy FP State Restore	4.7	5.6
Spectre-NG	2018-3693		Bounds Check Bypass Store (BCBS)	4.7	5.6
Foreshadow	2018-3615	Variant 5	L1 Terminal Fault (L1TF)	5.4	6.4
Foreshadow-NG	2018-3620			4.7	5.6
Foreshadow-NG	2018-3646			4.7	5.6

== See also ==
- Speculative execution CPU vulnerabilities
