= Load value injection =

Microprocessor security vulnerability

- Logo for the Load Value Injection security vulnerability
- Date discovered: March 2020; 6 years ago
- Affected hardware: Intel x86 microprocessors
- Website: lviattack.eu

Load value injection (LVI) is an attack on Intel microprocessors that can be used to attack Intel's Software Guard Extensions (SGX) technology. It is a development of the previously known Meltdown security vulnerability. Unlike Meltdown, which can only read hidden data, LVI can inject data values, and is resistant to the countermeasures so far used to mitigate the Meltdown vulnerability.

In theory, any processor affected by Meltdown may be vulnerable to LVI, but as of March 2020, LVI is only known to affect Intel microprocessors. Intel has published a guide to mitigating the vulnerability by using compiler technology, requiring existing software to be recompiled to add LFENCE memory barrier instructions at every potentially vulnerable point in the code. However, this mitigation appears likely to result in substantial performance reductions in the recompiled code.

== See also ==
- Transient execution CPU vulnerabilities
