= SWAPGS (security vulnerability) =

Computer security vulnerability utilizing branch prediction

SWAPGS, also known as Spectre variant 1, is a computer security vulnerability that utilizes the branch prediction used in modern microprocessors. Most modern processors use a form of speculative execution, where the processor begins work on a task before it is known if that task needs to be executed or not. Even if it is determined that the task was not needed, this speculation can leave traces in the processor's cache. Attackers can then extract these artifacts using a timing attack, similar to side-channel exploitation of Spectre.

The Common Vulnerabilities and Exposures ID issued to this vulnerability is CVE-2019-1125.

== History ==
SWAPGS is closely related to the Spectre-V1 vulnerability, which used similar side-channel vulnerabilities to access privileged cache memory in an operating system. The vulnerability was discovered by Andrei Vlad Lutas of Bitdefender and was reported to Intel. Intel coordinated with industry partners to address the issue on a software level. The first patches for SWAPGS were released on 9 July 2019 as part of the Microsoft Patch Tuesday. However, details regarding the vulnerability were not disclosed until 6 August 2019.

SWAPGS itself is an instruction to swap the GSBase register with a value stored in MSR. This is typically used to store kernel data.

== Affected systems ==
Any Intel-based processor that support SWAPGS and WRGSBASE instructions is affected. This includes every Intel processor starting from the Intel Ivy Bridge CPUs up to the most recent Intel processors.

Devices equipped with AMD processors are not affected, according to the company's product security update.

AMD is aware of new research claiming new speculative execution attacks that may allow access to privileged kernel data. Based on external and internal analysis, AMD believes it is not vulnerable to the SWAPGS variant attacks because AMD products are designed not to speculate on the new GS value following a speculative SWAPGS. For the attack that is not a SWAPGS variant, the mitigation is to implement our existing recommendations for Spectre variant 1.

— AMD Product Security

== Mitigation ==
For Windows operating system-based devices, Microsoft's security advisory lists the patches released in July 2019, which fix the vulnerability.

For Linux distributions, it is advised to check whether there are SWAPGS-specific patches that need to be applied. The kernel documentation describes the nature of the attacks and the in-kernel mitigations.

Bitdefender mentions in its original report that Apple devices are unlikely to be at risk.

== See also ==
- Foreshadow (security vulnerability)
- Microarchitectural Data Sampling − another set of vulnerabilities, including ZombieLoad, that can leak data in Intel microprocessors
- Rogue System Register Read (RSRR) – a related vulnerability, also known as Variant 3a
- Transient execution CPU vulnerabilities
