= SPMT =

SPMT can mean:

- Serial Port Memory Technology, a coalition of companies involved in designing and manufacturing mobile devices, integrated circuits, and semiconductor IP.
- Self Propelled Modular Transporter (SPMT), a platform vehicle with a large array of wheels on the bottom.
- Speculative multithreading (SpMT), a dynamic parallelization technique that depends on out-of-order execution to achieve speedup on multiprocessor CPUs.
- Knight Grand Commander of the Order of the Crown of Terengganu (S.P.M.T.), Sultanate of Terengganu, Terengganu, Malaysia
