= TLBleed =

Cryptographic side-channel attack on processors using simultaneous multithreading

TLBleed is a cryptographic side-channel attack that uses machine learning to exploit a timing side-channel via the translation look-aside buffer (TLB) on modern microprocessors that use simultaneous multithreading. As of June 2018, the attack has only been demonstrated experimentally on Intel processors; it is speculated that other processors may also potentially be vulnerable to a variant of the attack, but no proof of concept has been demonstrated. AMD had indicated that their processors would not be vulnerable to this attack.

The attack led to the OpenBSD project disabling simultaneous multithreading on Intel microprocessors. The OpenBSD project leader Theo de Raadt has stated that, while the attack could theoretically be addressed by preventing tasks with different security contexts from sharing physical cores, such a fix is currently impractical because of the complexity of the problem.

== See also ==
- Transient execution CPU vulnerability
- Zombieload
