= SWAPGS =

SWAPGS may be:

- SWAPGS (security vulnerability)
- an X86 hardware instruction
