= BCBS =

BCBS may refer to:

- The Basel Committee on Banking Supervision
- The Blue Cross Blue Shield Association
- Bishop Cotton Boys' School, in Bangalore, India
- Bounds Check Bypass Store, a Spectre-NG class security vulnerability
