= RFDS (disambiguation) =

The Royal Flying Doctor Service, an air medical service in Australia.

RFDS may also refer to:

- RFDS (TV series), an Australian drama television series
- Register File Data Sampling, a vulnerability in Intel Atom processors
