= Anticiparallelism =

Anticiparallelism (Anticipatory Parallelism) is a term coined by Bob Metcalfe in 1998. It is a technique of using idle machine cycles to perform useful computing tasks in the background. Such tasks must be readily interrupted for intervals when the computer needs to return to its primary task. An example of such a task is transmitting e-mail. Anticiparalleism is also known as speculative execution, continual computation or optimistic execution.

== See also ==
- Folding@home, a distributed computing project that uses idle processing resources of personal computers owned by volunteers who have installed the software on their systems
