= Microarchitectural Data Sampling =

CPU vulnerabilities

- Logo designed for the vulnerabilities, featuring a wounded hand holding a broken microprocessor
- Date discovered: 2018
- Date patched: 14 May 2019
- Discoverer: (Australia) University of Adelaide (Austria) Graz University of Technology (Belgium) Catholic University of Leuven (China) Qihoo 360 (Germany) Cyberus Technology (Germany) Saarland University (Netherlands) Vrije Universiteit Amsterdam (Romania) Bitdefender (United States) Oracle Corporation (United States) University of Michigan (United States) Worcester Polytechnic Institute
- Affected hardware: Pre-April 2019 Intel x86 microprocessors
- Website: mdsattacks.com ZombieLoadAttack.com

The Microarchitectural Data Sampling (MDS) vulnerabilities are a set of weaknesses in Intel x86 microprocessors that use hyper-threading, and leak data across protection boundaries that are architecturally supposed to be secure. The attacks exploiting the vulnerabilities have been labeled Fallout, RIDL (Rogue In-Flight Data Load), ZombieLoad., and ZombieLoad 2.

== Description ==
The vulnerabilities are in the implementation of speculative execution, which is where the processor tries to guess what instructions may be needed next. They exploit the possibility of reading data buffers found between different parts of the processor.

- Microarchitectural Store Buffer Data Sampling (MSBDS), CVE-2018-12126
- Microarchitectural Load Port Data Sampling (MLPDS), CVE-2018-12127
- Microarchitectural Fill Buffer Data Sampling (MFBDS), CVE-2018-12130
- Microarchitectural Data Sampling Uncacheable Memory (MDSUM), CVE-2019-11091
- Transactional Asynchronous Abort (TAA), CVE-2019-11135

Not all processors are affected by all variants of MDS.

== History ==
According to Intel in a May 2019 interview with Wired, Intel's researchers discovered the vulnerabilities in 2018 before anyone else. Other researchers had agreed to keep the exploit confidential as well since 2018.

On 14 May 2019, various groups of security researchers, amongst others from Austria's Graz University of Technology, Belgium's Catholic University of Leuven, and Netherlands' Vrije Universiteit Amsterdam, in a disclosure coordinated with Intel, published the discovery of the MDS vulnerabilities in Intel microprocessors, which they named Fallout, RIDL and ZombieLoad. Three of the TU Graz researchers were from the group who had discovered Meltdown and Spectre the year before.

On 12 November 2019, a new variant of the ZombieLoad attack, called Transactional Asynchronous Abort, was disclosed.

== Impact ==
According to varying reports, Intel processors dating back to 2011 or 2008 are affected, and the fixes may be associated with a performance drop. Intel reported that processors manufactured in the month before the disclosure have mitigations against the attacks.

Intel characterized the vulnerabilities as "low-to-medium" impact, disagreeing with the security researchers who characterized them as major, and disagreeing with their recommendation that operating system software manufacturers should completely disable hyperthreading. Nevertheless, the ZombieLoad vulnerability can be used by hackers exploiting the vulnerability to steal information recently accessed by the affected microprocessor.

== Mitigation ==
Fixes to operating systems, virtualization mechanisms, web browsers and microcode are necessary. As of 14 May 2019, applying available updates on an affected PC system was the most that could be done to mitigate the issues.

- Intel incorporated fixes in its processors starting shortly before the public announcement of the vulnerabilities.
- On 14 May 2019, a mitigation was released for the Linux kernel, and Apple, Google, Microsoft, and Amazon released emergency patches for their products to mitigate ZombieLoad.
- On 14 May 2019, Intel published a security advisory on its website detailing its plans to mitigate ZombieLoad.

== See also ==
- Transient execution CPU vulnerabilities
- Hardware security bug
