= Serial Port Memory Technology =

The SPMT Consortium is a coalition of companies involved in designing and manufacturing mobile devices, integrated circuits, and semiconductor IP. The organization developed the SPMT specification, which is a SerDes memory interface primarily for commodity DRAM and mobile markets. The specification is ideal for data intensive, media-rich functionality like video, GPS, internet access, email, multimedia, and music.

== History ==
The SPMT Consortium was founded in 2009 by ARM Holdings, Hynix Semiconductor, Inc., LG Electronics, Samsung Electronics Co., Ltd. and Silicon Image, Inc. The Consortium is managed by SPMT, LLC, the entity responsible for licensing the SPMT memory interface specification. SPMT is a memory specification for dynamic random access memory (DRAM) that is based on SerDes rather than a standard parallel interface.

== Technology summary ==
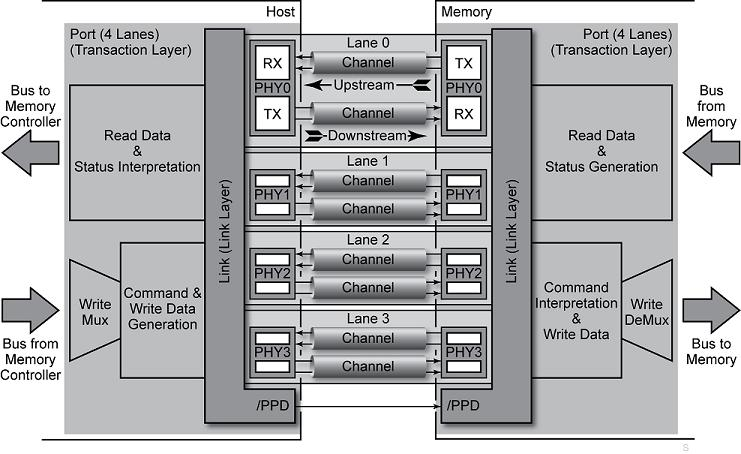
SPMT Functional Blocks

1. 20 signaling pins for 6 GB/s performance
2. Simultaneous Read/Write
3. Low energy per bit – (4–5 pJ/bit effective)
4. Self-clocking
5. Low EMI
6. High noise rejection
7. Standard DRAM commands
8. Burst lengths of 16, 32, and 64 bytes
9. Low voltage differential signaling

== Members ==
The SPMT Consortium is divided into three levels of membership: Promoters (Founders), Contributors, and Members.

- Promoters (Founders): Define, implement and promote Serial Port Memory Technology for broad market adoption as an industry standard.
- Contributors: Work in cooperation with the promoters and participate in the definition of future SPMT specifications.
- Members: Have access to the latest version of the SPMT specification and the rights to create innovative products that implement the technology. The SPMT Consortium assesses an annual fee from all members to help fund the marketing, administration and licensing activities of the Consortium.

== Timeline of events ==
- May 18, 2009 - SPMT Consortium announced.
- July 21, 2009 - SPMT President appointed.
- August 17, 2009 - ARM joins SPMT as Promoter.
- August 31, 2009 - SPMT releases abridged specification.
- October 1, 2009 - SPMT releases new technology specification.

== See also ==
- Physical layer
- Link layer
