= Gazelle (web browser) =

Web browser research project

- Developer: Microsoft Research
- Release: 2009
- Final release: Prototype only
- Operating system: Cross-platform (conceptual)
- Type: Web browser (research)
- License: Proprietary (research prototype)
- Website: Microsoft Research

Gazelle was a research web browser project by Microsoft Research, first announced in early 2009. The central notion of the project was to apply operating system (OS) principles to browser construction. In particular, the browser had a secure kernel, modeled after an OS kernel, and various web sources run as separate "principals" above that, similar to user space processes in an OS. The goal of doing this was to prevent bad code from one web source to affect the rendering or processing of code from other web sources. Browser plugins are also managed as principals.

Gazelle had a predecessor project, MashupOS, but with Gazelle the emphasis was on a more secure browser.

By the July 2009 announcement of ChromeOS, Gazelle was seen as a possible alternative Microsoft architectural approach compared to Google's direction. That is, rather than the OS being reduced in role to that of a browser, the browser would be strengthened using OS principles.

The Gazelle project became dormant, and ServiceOS arose as a replacement project also related to browser architectures. But by 2015, the SecureOS project was also dormant, after Microsoft decided that its new flagship browser would be Edge.
