= Transient execution CPU vulnerability =

Computer vulnerability using speculative execution

Transient execution CPU vulnerabilities are vulnerabilities in which instructions, most often optimized using speculative execution, are executed temporarily by a microprocessor, without committing their results due to a misprediction or error, resulting in leaking secret data to an unauthorized party. The archetype is Spectre, and transient execution attacks like Spectre belong to the cache-attack category, one of several categories of side-channel attacks. Since January 2018 many different cache-attack vulnerabilities have been identified.

== Overview ==
Modern computers are highly parallel devices, composed of components with very different performance characteristics. If an operation (such as a branch) cannot yet be performed because some earlier slow operation (such as a memory read) has not yet completed, a microprocessor may attempt to predict the result of the earlier operation and execute the later operation speculatively, acting as if the prediction were correct. The prediction may be based on recent behavior of the system. When the earlier, slower operation completes, the microprocessor determines whether the prediction was correct or incorrect. If it was correct then execution proceeds uninterrupted; if it was incorrect then the microprocessor rolls back the speculatively executed operations and repeats the original instruction with the real result of the slow operation. Specifically, a transient instruction refers to an instruction processed by error by the processor (incriminating the branch predictor in the case of Spectre) which can affect the micro-architectural state of the processor, leaving the architectural state without any trace of its execution.

In terms of the directly visible behavior of the computer it is as if the speculatively executed code "never happened". However, this speculative execution may affect the state of certain components of the microprocessor, such as the cache, and this effect may be discovered by careful monitoring of the timing of subsequent operations.

If an attacker can arrange that the speculatively executed code (which may be directly written by the attacker, or may be a suitable gadget that they have found in the targeted system) operates on secret data that they are unauthorized to access, and has a different effect on the cache for different values of the secret data, they may be able to discover the value of the secret data.

== Timeline ==
=== 2018 ===
In early January 2018, it was reported that all Intel processors made since 1995 (besides Intel Itanium and pre-2013 Intel Atom) have been subject to two security flaws dubbed Meltdown and Spectre.

The impact on performance resulting from software patches is "workload-dependent". Several procedures to help protect home computers and related devices from the Spectre and Meltdown security vulnerabilities have been published. Spectre patches have been reported to significantly slow down performance, especially on older computers; on the newer 8th-generation Core platforms, benchmark performance drops of 2–14% have been measured. Meltdown patches may also produce performance loss. It is believed that "hundreds of millions" of systems could be affected by these flaws. More security flaws were disclosed on May 3, 2018, on August 14, 2018, on January 18, 2019, and on March 5, 2020.

At the time, Intel was not commenting on this issue.

On March 15, 2018, Intel reported that it will redesign its CPUs (performance losses to be determined) to protect against the Spectre security vulnerability, and expects to release the newly redesigned processors later in 2018.

On May 3, 2018, eight additional Spectre-class flaws were reported. Intel reported that they are preparing new patches to mitigate these flaws.

On August 14, 2018, Intel disclosed three additional chip flaws referred to as L1 Terminal Fault (L1TF). They reported that previously released microcode updates, along with new, pre-release microcode updates can be used to mitigate these flaws.

=== 2019 ===
On January 18, 2019, Intel disclosed three new vulnerabilities affecting all Intel CPUs, named "Fallout", "RIDL", and "ZombieLoad", allowing a program to read information recently written, read data in the line-fill buffers and load ports, and leak information from other processes and virtual machines. Coffee Lake-series CPUs are even more vulnerable, due to hardware mitigations for Spectre.

=== 2020 ===
On March 5, 2020, computer security experts reported another Intel chip security flaw, besides the Meltdown and Spectre flaws, with the systematic name CVE-2019-0090 (or "Intel CSME Bug"). This newly found flaw is not fixable with a firmware update, and affects nearly "all Intel chips released in the past five years".

=== 2021 ===
In March 2021 AMD security researchers discovered that the Predictive Store Forwarding algorithm in Zen 3 CPUs could be used by malicious applications to access data it shouldn't be accessing. According to Phoronix there's little performance impact in disabling the feature.

In June 2021, two new vulnerabilities, Speculative Code Store Bypass (SCSB, CVE-2021-0086) and Floating Point Value Injection (FPVI, CVE-2021-0089), affecting all modern x86-64 CPUs both from Intel and AMD were discovered. In order to mitigate them software has to be rewritten and recompiled. ARM CPUs are not affected by SCSB but some certain ARM architectures are affected by FPVI.

Also in June 2021, MIT researchers revealed the PACMAN attack on Pointer Authentication Codes (PAC) in ARM v8.3A.

In August 2021 a vulnerability called "Transient Execution of Non-canonical Accesses" affecting certain AMD CPUs was disclosed. It requires the same mitigations as the MDS vulnerability affecting certain Intel CPUs. It was assigned CVE-2020-12965. Since most x86 software is already patched against MDS and this vulnerability has the exact same mitigations, software vendors don't have to address this vulnerability.

In October 2021 for the first time ever a vulnerability similar to Meltdown was disclosed to be affecting all AMD CPUs however the company doesn't think any new mitigations have to be applied and the existing ones are already sufficient.

=== 2022 ===
In March 2022, a new variant of the Spectre vulnerability called Branch History Injection was disclosed. It affects certain ARM64 CPUs and the following Intel CPU families: Cascade Lake, Ice Lake, Tiger Lake and Alder Lake. According to Linux kernel developers AMD CPUs are also affected.

In March 2022, a vulnerability affecting a wide range of AMD CPUs was disclosed under CVE-2021-26341.

In June 2022, multiple MMIO Intel CPUs vulnerabilities related to execution in virtual environments were announced. The following CVEs were designated: CVE-2022-21123, CVE-2022-21125, CVE-2022-21166.

In July 2022, the Retbleed vulnerability was disclosed affecting Intel Core 6 to 8th generation CPUs and AMD Zen 1, 1+ and 2 generation CPUs. Newer Intel microarchitectures as well as AMD starting with Zen 3 are not affected. The mitigations for the vulnerability decrease the performance of the affected Intel CPUs by up to 39%, while AMD CPUs lose up to 14%.

In August 2022, the SQUIP vulnerability was disclosed affecting Ryzen 2000–5000 series CPUs. According to AMD the existing mitigations are enough to protect from it.

According to a Phoronix review released in October, 2022 Zen 4/Ryzen 7000 CPUs are not slowed down by mitigations, in fact disabling them leads to a performance loss.

=== 2023 ===
In February 2023 a vulnerability affecting a wide range of AMD CPU architectures called "Cross-Thread Return Address Predictions" was disclosed.

In July 2023 a critical vulnerability in the Zen 2 AMD microarchitecture called Zenbleed was made public. AMD released a microcode update to fix it.

In August 2023 a vulnerability in AMD's Zen 1, Zen 2, Zen 3, and Zen 4 microarchitectures called Inception was revealed and assigned CVE-2023-20569. According to AMD it is not practical but the company released a microcode update for the affected products.

Also in August 2023 a new vulnerability called Downfall or Gather Data Sampling was disclosed, affecting Intel CPU Skylake, Cascade Lake, Cooper Lake, Ice Lake, Tiger Lake, Amber Lake, Kaby Lake, Coffee Lake, Whiskey Lake, Comet Lake & Rocket Lake CPU families. Intel will release a microcode update for affected products.

The SLAM vulnerability (Spectre based on Linear Address Masking) reported in 2023 neither has received a corresponding CVE, nor has been confirmed or mitigated against.

=== 2024 ===
In March 2024, a variant of Spectre-V1 attack called GhostRace was published. It was claimed it affected all the major microarchitectures and vendors, including Intel, AMD and ARM. It was assigned CVE-2024-2193. AMD dismissed the vulnerability (calling it "Speculative Race Conditions (SRCs)") claiming that existing mitigations were enough. Linux kernel developers chose not to add mitigations citing performance concerns. The Xen hypervisor project released patches to mitigate the vulnerability but they are not enabled by default.

Also in March 2024, a vulnerability in Intel Atom processors called Register File Data Sampling (RFDS) was revealed. It was assigned CVE-2023-28746. Its mitigations incur a slight performance degradation.

In April 2024, it was revealed that the BHI vulnerability in certain Intel CPU families could be still exploited in Linux entirely in user space without using any kernel features or root access despite existing mitigations. Intel recommended "additional software hardening". The attack was assigned CVE-2024-2201.

In June 2024, Samsung Research and Seoul National University researchers revealed the TikTag attack against the Memory Tagging Extension in ARM v8.5A CPUs. The researchers created PoCs for Google Chrome and the Linux kernel. Researchers from VUSec previously revealed ARM's Memory Tagging Extension is vulnerable to speculative probing.

In July 2024, UC San Diego researchers revealed the Indirector attack against Intel Alder Lake and Raptor Lake CPUs leveraging high-precision Branch Target Injection (BTI). Intel downplayed the severity of the vulnerability and claimed the existing mitigations are enough to tackle the issue. No CVE was assigned.

=== 2025 ===
In January 2025, Georgia Institute of Technology researchers published two whitepapers on Data Speculation Attacks via Load Address Prediction on Apple Silicon (SLAP) and Breaking the Apple M3 CPU via False Load Output Predictions (FLOP).

Also in January 2025, ARM disclosed a vulnerability (CVE-2024-7881) in which an unprivileged context can trigger a data memory-dependent prefetch engine to fetch data from a privileged location, potentially leading to unauthorized access. To mitigate the issue, Arm recommends disabling the affected prefetcher by setting CPUACTLR6_EL1[41].

In May 2025, VUSec released three vulnerabilities extending on Spectre-v2 in various Intel and ARM architectures under the moniker Training Solo. Mitigations require a microcode update for Intel CPUs and changes in the Linux kernel.

- The history-based attack affects all Intel CPUs with eIBRS, including the latest as of 2025, Intel’s latest generation Lion Cove which features the BHI_NO feature and selected ARM microarchitectures.
- Indirect Target Selection (ITS) (CVE-2024-28956) affects Intel Core 9th-11th generations and Intel Xeon 2nd-3rd generations.
- Lion Cove BPU issue (CVE-2025-24495) affects the Lion Cove core, Lunar Lake and Arrow Lake.

Also in May 2025, ETH Zurich Computer Security Group "COMSEC" disclosed the Branch Privilege Injection vulnerability affecting all Intel x86 architectures starting from the 9th generation (Coffee Lake Refresh) under CVE-2024-45332. A microcode update is required to mitigate it. It comes with a performance cost up to 8%.

In July 2025, AMD disclosed a new class of speculative execution vulnerabilities known as Transient Scheduler Attacks (TSA), which were discovered by researchers from Microsoft. The attacks are affecting AMD Zen 3 and Zen 4 microarchitectures, and they exploit microarchitectural timing leaks in CPU scheduler logic—specifically, the forwarding of incorrect data during false completion of speculative loads—to infer sensitive data from other processes or privilege levels. TSA encompasses four vulnerabilities: CVE-2024-36350 (TSA-SQ), which leaks data from prior stores; CVE-2024-36357 (TSA-L1), which leverages the L1 data cache; CVE-2024-36348, enabling speculative reads of control registers; and CVE-2024-36349, which leaks TSC_AUX register values. Mitigations include microcode updates, Linux kernel patches (tsa= tunable), and optional use of the VERW instruction—albeit with potential performance costs.

In September 2025, researchers at ETH Zurich disclosed VMScape (CVE-2025-40300), a Spectre-BTI-style transient execution attack that exploits incomplete isolation of the branch predictor between guest virtual machines and host user-space hypervisors (notably QEMU under KVM), allowing a malicious guest to influence speculative execution and leak sensitive host memory. The flaw affects AMD Zen 1–5 and Intel “Coffee Lake” processors, and mitigations include Linux kernel patches that conditionally issue Indirect Branch Prediction Barrier (IBPB) instructions on VMEXITs before returning control to user-space in order to flush predictor state.

=== 2026 ===
In February 2026 at FOSDEM 2026, the talk "How Secure Are Commercial RISC-V CPUs?" covered the security properties of several commercially available RISC-V processors and showed that current implementations already exhibit weaknesses related to microarchitectural side channels and speculative behavior. The researchers demonstrated that even relatively "simple" in-order RISC-V cores can leak sensitive information through timing channels, unprivileged performance counters, and undocumented vendor-specific extensions. The authors argued that manual analysis of such designs does not scale and presented RISCover, an open-source differential fuzzing framework, to compare architectural behavior across cores and configurations. Using this approach, they identified issues such as out-of-bounds memory accesses and denial-of-service conditions, and suggested that the lack of standardized mechanisms to constrain speculation and timing sources increases the risk of transient execution vulnerabilities similar to those previously observed in x86 and ARM processors.

In April 2026, Floating Point Divider State Sampling (FP-DSS), a transient execution vulnerability, affecting multiple generations of AMD CPUs, was reported in a paper titled "TREVEX: A Black-Box Detection Framework For Data-Flow Transient Execution Vulnerabilities". It was assigned CVE-2025-54505.

In August 2026, researchers from the CISPA Helmholtz Center for Information Security and KU Leuven disclosed that commercially available out-of-order RISC-V processors are susceptible to multiple Spectre variants. The researchers demonstrated Spectre-PHT, Spectre-BTB, SpectreRSB, and Spectre-STL attacks against the SiFive P550 and T-Head Xuantie C910 and C920 processors, achieving a proof-of-concept attack that leaked arbitrary Linux kernel memory from a Xuantie C910 at a rate of 338 bytes per second. The findings challenged the assumption that RISC-V's relatively simple ISA made its implementations inherently resistant to transient-execution attacks; the researchers noted that existing software mitigations developed for x86 and ARM do not necessarily transfer to RISC-V and that the architecture lacks a dedicated speculation barrier. Three patches resulting from the disclosure had been merged into the Linux kernel, with additional patches under review, while SiFive and T-Head had developed processor-specific mitigations.

In September 2026 researchers disclosed Branch Target Reuse (BTR), the first demonstrated practical in-place Spectre-v2 attack. BTR exploits stale indirect-branch prediction entries left behind when JIT-generated code is replaced, enabling speculative control-flow hijacking into newly generated code at obsolete offsets. The attack was demonstrated against SpiderMonkey, GraalVM and the Linux kernel's cBPF JIT; two end-to-end Linux exploits recovered the root password hash within minutes on tested Intel systems, including with cBPF constant blinding enabled. Linux and Oracle deployed mitigations following coordinated disclosure, with the Linux fixes assigned CVE-2026-64507 and CVE-2026-64508.

== Future ==
Spectre class vulnerabilities will remain unfixed because otherwise CPU designers will have to disable speculative execution which will entail a massive performance loss. Despite this, AMD has managed to design Zen 4 such a way its performance is not affected by mitigations.

== Vulnerabilities and mitigations summary ==
Mitigation Type	Comprehensiveness	Effectiveness	Performance impact	Description
Hardware	Full	Full	None to small	Require changes to the CPU design and thus a new iteration of hardware
Microcode	Partial to full	Partial to full	None to large	Updates the software that the CPU runs on which requires patches to be released for each affected CPU and integrated into every BIOS or operating system
OS/VMM	Partial	Partial to full	Small to large	Applied at the operating system or virtual machine level and (depending on workload)
Software recompilation	Poor	Partial to full	Medium to large	Requires recompiling lots of pieces of software

* Various CPU microarchitectures not included above are also affected, among them are ARM, IBM Power, IBM Z, MIPS and others. Vulnerabilities starting with SLAM are not included in the table. It only exists as historical evidence because it doesn't include newer AMD and Intel x86 architectures.

** The 8th generation Coffee Lake architecture in this table also applies to a wide range of previously released Intel CPUs, not limited to the architectures based on Intel Core, Pentium 4 and Intel Atom starting with Silvermont.

Vulnerability Name(s)/Subname Official Name/Subname			CVE	Affected CPU architectures and mitigations*						
Vulnerability Name(s)/Subname Official Name/Subname			CVE	Intel					AMD	
Vulnerability Name(s)/Subname Official Name/Subname			CVE	10th gen		9th gen	8th gen**		Zen / Zen+	Zen 2
Vulnerability Name(s)/Subname Official Name/Subname			CVE	Ice Lake	Cascade / Comet / Amber Lake	Coffee Lake	Whiskey Lake	Coffee Lake, Amber Lake	Zen / Zen+	Zen 2
Spectre	v1 Bounds Check Bypass		CVE-2017-5753	Software recompilation						
Spectre	v2 Branch Target Injection		CVE-2017-5715	Hardware + OS/VMM / Software recompilation		Microcode + ...		Microcode + OS/VMM / Software recompilation		Hardware + OS/VMM / Software recompilation
Spectre	v2 Branch Target Injection		CVE-2017-5715	Hardware + OS/VMM / Software recompilation		Hardware + ... (Note: Whiskey Lake stepping C Coffee Lake stepping D)		Microcode + OS/VMM / Software recompilation		Hardware + OS/VMM / Software recompilation
Meltdown / v3 Rogue Data Cache Load			CVE-2017-5754	Hardware				OS	Not affected	
Spectre-NG	v3a Rogue System Register Read		CVE-2018-3640	Hardware	Hardware	Microcode	Microcode	Microcode	Not affected	
Spectre-NG	v3a Rogue System Register Read		CVE-2018-3640	Hardware	Microcode (Note: Comet Lake except U42 (CPUID 806EC))	Microcode	Hardware	Microcode	Not affected	
Spectre-NG	v4 Speculative Store Bypass		CVE-2018-3639	[Hardware + OS / ] Software recompilation			...	[Microcode + OS / ] Software recompilation	OS/VMM	Hardware + OS/VMM
Spectre-NG	v4 Speculative Store Bypass		CVE-2018-3639	[Hardware + OS / ] Software recompilation			...	[Microcode + OS / ] Software recompilation	OS/VMM	Hardware + OS/VMM
Spectre-NG	Lazy FP State Restore		CVE-2018-3665	OS/VMM					Not affected	
Spectre-NG	v1.1 Bounds Check Bypass Store		CVE-2018-3693	Software recompilation						
SpectreRSB/ret2spec; Return Mispredict			CVE-2018-15572	OS						
Foreshadow; L1 Terminal Fault (L1TF)	SGX		CVE-2018-3615	Not affected				Microcode	Not affected	
Foreshadow; L1 Terminal Fault (L1TF)	OS/SMM		CVE-2018-3620	Not affected				Microcode + OS/VMM	Not affected	
Foreshadow; L1 Terminal Fault (L1TF)	VMM		CVE-2018-3646	Not affected				Microcode + OS/VMM	Not affected	
Microarchitectural Data Sampling (MDS)	RIDL	ZombieLoad; Fill Buffer (MFBDS)	CVE-2018-12130	Not affected				Microcode + OS	Not affected	
Microarchitectural Data Sampling (MDS)	RIDL	Load Port (MLPDS)	CVE-2018-12127	Hardware	Microcode + OS/VMM (Note: Cascade Lake stepping 5)			Microcode + OS	Not affected	
Microarchitectural Data Sampling (MDS)	RIDL	Load Port (MLPDS)	CVE-2018-12127	Hardware	Hardware			Microcode + OS	Not affected	
Microarchitectural Data Sampling (MDS)	Fallout; Store Buffer (MSBDS)		CVE-2018-12126	Hardware + Microcode	Microcode + OS/VMM			Microcode + OS/VMM	Not affected	
Microarchitectural Data Sampling (MDS)	Fallout; Store Buffer (MSBDS)		CVE-2018-12126	Hardware				Microcode + OS/VMM	Not affected	
Microarchitectural Data Sampling (MDS)	RIDL	Uncacheable Memory (MDSUM)	CVE-2019-11091	Same as the buffer having entries				Microcode + OS/VMM	Not affected	
SWAPGS			CVE-2019-1125	OS					Not affected	
RIDL (Rogue In-Flight Data Load)	ZombieLoad v2 TSX Asynchronous Abort (TAA)		CVE-2019-11135	Hardware (Note: Ice Lake Xeon-SP (CPUID 606A*))	Microcode + OS/VMM	Existing MDS mitigations		Existing MDS mitigations	Not affected	
RIDL (Rogue In-Flight Data Load)	ZombieLoad v2 TSX Asynchronous Abort (TAA)		CVE-2019-11135	TSX not supported		Microcode + OS/VMM		Existing MDS mitigations	Not affected	
RIDL (Rogue In-Flight Data Load)	ZombieLoad/CacheOut; L1D Eviction Sampling (L1DES)		CVE-2020-0549	Not affected	Microcode	Microcode			Not affected	
RIDL (Rogue In-Flight Data Load)	ZombieLoad/CacheOut; L1D Eviction Sampling (L1DES)		CVE-2020-0549	Not affected	Not affected	Microcode			Not affected	
RIDL (Rogue In-Flight Data Load)	Vector Register Sampling (VRS)		CVE-2020-0548	Not affected	Microcode	Microcode			Not affected	
RIDL (Rogue In-Flight Data Load)	Vector Register Sampling (VRS)		CVE-2020-0548	Not affected	Not affected	Microcode			Not affected	
Load Value Injection (LVI)			CVE-2020-0551	Not affected	Software recompilation (mainly for Intel SGX)				Not affected	
CROSSTalk; Special Register Buffer Data Sampling (SRBDS)			CVE-2020-0543	Not affected	Microcode (Note: Comet Lake U42 Amber Lake (CPUID 806EC))	Microcode			Not affected	
CROSSTalk; Special Register Buffer Data Sampling (SRBDS)			CVE-2020-0543	Not affected	Not affected	Microcode			Not affected	
Floating Point Value Injection (FPVI)			CVE-2021-0086; CVE-2021-26314	Software recompilation						
Speculative Code Store Bypass (SCSB)			CVE-2021-0089; CVE-2021-26313	Software recompilation						
Branch History Injection (BHI) and other forms of intra-mode BTI			CVE-2022-0001; CVE-2022-0002	Software recompilation		Not affected		Not affected		
Branch History Injection (BHI) and other forms of intra-mode BTI			CVE-2022-0001; CVE-2022-0002	Software recompilation		Software recompilation		Not affected		
MMIO Stale Data	Shared Buffers Data Read (SBDR)		CVE-2022-21123	Not affected (Note: Cascade Lake) Microcode + Software recompilation (Note: Ice Lake Core family (CPUID 706E5))		Microcode + Software recompilation		Software recompilation	Not affected	
MMIO Stale Data	Shared Buffers Data Sampling (SBDS)		CVE-2022-21125	Not affected Microcode + Software recompilation		Microcode + Software recompilation		Software recompilation	Not affected	
MMIO Stale Data	Device Register Partial Write (DRPW)		CVE-2022-21166	Microcode				Existing MDS mitigations	Not affected	
Branch Type Confusion (BTC)	Phantom	BTC-NOBR; BTC-DIR	CVE-2022-23825	Not affected					OS/VMM	
Branch Type Confusion (BTC)	Phantom	BTC-IND	CVE-2022-23825	Not affected					Existing Spectre v2 mitigations	
Branch Type Confusion (BTC)	Retbleed; BTC-RET		CVE-2022-29900; CVE-2022-29901	Not affected		OS/VMM		OS/VMM	OS/VMM / Software recompilation	
Branch Type Confusion (BTC)	Retbleed; BTC-RET		CVE-2022-29900; CVE-2022-29901	Not affected		Not affected		OS/VMM	OS/VMM / Software recompilation	
Cross-Thread Return Address Predictions			CVE-2022-27672	Not affected					OS/VMM	
Zenbleed; Cross-Process Information Leak			CVE-2023-20593	Not affected						Microcode
Inception; Speculative Return Stack Overflow (SRSO)			CVE-2023-20569	Not affected					OS/VMM	
Downfall; Gather Data Sampling (GDS)			CVE-2022-40982	Microcode					Not affected	
