= Spectre (security vulnerability) =

Processor security vulnerability

- A logo created for the vulnerability, featuring a ghost with a branch
- Date discovered: December 2017; 8 years ago
- Affected hardware: All pre-2019 microprocessors that use branch prediction
- Website: Official website

Spectre is a class of speculative execution CPU vulnerabilities that involve side-channel attacks, first discovered in 2017. There are multiple variants that affect modern microprocessors capable of performing branch prediction and other forms of speculative execution. On most processors, the speculative execution resulting from a branch misprediction may leave observable side effects that may reveal private data to attackers. For example, if the pattern of memory accesses performed by such speculative execution depends on private data, the resulting state of the data cache constitutes a side-channel through which an attacker may be able to extract information about the private data using a timing attack.

In addition to vulnerabilities associated with installed applications, JIT engines used for JavaScript were found to be vulnerable. A website can read data stored in the browser for another website, or the browser's memory itself.

Two Common Vulnerabilities and Exposures records related to Spectre, CVE-2017-5753 (bounds check bypass, Spectre-V1, Spectre 1.0) and CVE-2017-5715 (branch target injection, Spectre-V2), have been issued.

In early 2018, Intel reported that it would redesign its CPUs to help protect against the Spectre and related Meltdown vulnerabilities (specifically, Spectre variant 2 and Meltdown, but not Spectre variant 1). On 8 October 2018, Intel was reported to have added hardware and firmware mitigations regarding Spectre and Meltdown vulnerabilities to its latest processors. For devices that were already vulnerable, software patches were released that addressed the issue at the cost of performance. Mitigations were applied to the Linux kernel, the Windows operating system, and some vulnerable user-mode applications.

== History ==
Yukiyasu Tsunoo and colleagues from NEC showed how to attack MISTY and DES symmetric key ciphers in 2002 and 2003, respectively. In 2005, Daniel Bernstein from the University of Illinois, Chicago, reported an extraction of an OpenSSL AES key via a cache timing attack, and Colin Percival had a working attack on the OpenSSL RSA key using the Intel processor's cache. In 2013, Yuval Yarom and Katrina Falkner from the University of Adelaide showed how measuring the access time to data lets a nefarious application determine if the information was read from the cache or not. If it were read from the cache, the access time would be very short, meaning the data read could contain the private key of encryption algorithms. This technique was used to successfully attack GnuPG, AES, and other cryptographic implementations. In January 2017, Anders Fogh gave a presentation at the Ruhr University Bochum about automatically finding covert channels, especially on processors with a pipeline used by more than one processor core.

Spectre proper was discovered independently by Jann Horn from Google's Project Zero and Paul Kocher in collaboration with Daniel Genkin, Mike Hamburg, Moritz Lipp, and Yuval Yarom. It was made public in conjunction with another vulnerability, Meltdown, on 3 January 2018, after the affected hardware vendors had already been made aware of the issue on 1 June 2017. The vulnerability was called Spectre because it was "based on the root cause, speculative execution. As it is not easy to fix, it will haunt us for quite some time."

On 28 January 2018, it was reported that Intel shared news of the Meltdown and Spectre security vulnerabilities with Chinese technology companies before notifying the U.S. government of the flaws.

On 29 January 2018, Microsoft was reported to have released a Windows update that disabled the problematic Intel Microcode fix—which had, in some cases, caused reboots, system instability, and data loss or corruption—issued earlier by Intel for the Spectre Variant 2 attack. Woody Leonhard of ComputerWorld expressed a concern about installing the new Microsoft patch.

Since the disclosure of Spectre and Meltdown in January 2018, much research has been done on vulnerabilities related to speculative execution. On 3 May 2018, eight additional Spectre-class flaws provisionally named Spectre-NG by c't (a German computer magazine) were reported affecting Intel and possibly AMD and ARM processors. Intel reported that they were preparing new patches to mitigate these flaws. Affected are all Core i Series processors and Xeon derivatives since Nehalem (2010) and Atom-based processors since 2013. Intel postponed their release of microcode updates to 10 July 2018.

On 21 May 2018, Intel published information on the first two Spectre-NG class side-channel vulnerabilities: CVE-2018-3640 (Rogue System Register Read, Variant 3a) and CVE-2018-3639 (Speculative Store Bypass, Variant 4), also referred to as Intel SA-00115 and HP PSR-2018-0074, respectively.

According to Amazon Germany, Cyberus Technology, SYSGO, and Colin Percival (FreeBSD), Intel revealed details on the third Spectre-NG variant CVE-2018-3665 (Lazy FP State Restore, Intel SA-00145) on 13 June 2018. It is also known as Lazy FPU state leak (abbreviated "LazyFP") and "Spectre-NG 3".

On 10 July 2018, Intel revealed details on another Spectre-NG class vulnerability called "Bounds Check Bypass Store" (BCBS), or "Spectre 1.1" (CVE-2018-3693), which was able to write as well as read out of bounds. Another variant named "Spectre 1.2" was mentioned as well.

In late July 2018, researchers at the universities of Saarland and California revealed ret spec (aka "Spectre v5") and SpectreRSB, new types of code execution vulnerabilities using the return stack buffer (RSB).

At the end of July 2018, researchers at the Graz University of Technology revealed "NetSpectre", a new type of remote attack similar to Spectre v1, but which does not need attacker-controlled code to be run on the target device.

On 8 October 2018, Intel was reported to have added hardware and firmware mitigations regarding Spectre and Meltdown vulnerabilities to its latest processors.

In November 2018, five new variants of the attacks were revealed. Researchers attempted to compromise CPU protection mechanisms using code to exploit the CPU pattern history table, branch target buffer, return stack buffer, and branch history table.

In August 2019, a related speculative execution CPU vulnerability, Spectre SWAPGS (CVE-2019-1125), was reported.

In July 2020 a team of researchers from TU Kaiserslautern in Germany published a new Spectre variant called "Spectre-STC" (single-threaded contention). This variant makes use of port contention in shared resources and can be applied even in single-threaded cores.

In late April 2021, a related vulnerability was discovered that breaks through the security systems designed to mitigate Spectre through use of the micro-op cache. The vulnerability is known to affect Skylake and later processors from Intel and Zen-based processors from AMD.

In February 2023, a team of researchers at North Carolina State University uncovered a new code execution vulnerability called "Spectre-HD", also known as "Spectre SRV" or "Spectre v6". This vulnerability leverages speculative vectorization with the selective replay (SRV) technique showing "Leakage from Higher Dimensional Speculation".

== Mechanism ==
Instead of a single easy-to-fix vulnerability, the Spectre white paper describes a whole class of potential vulnerabilities. They are all based on exploiting side effects of speculative execution, a common means of hiding memory latency and so speeding up execution in modern microprocessors. In particular, Spectre centers on branch prediction, which is a special case of speculative execution. Unlike the related Meltdown vulnerability disclosed at the same time, Spectre does not rely on a specific feature of a single processor's memory management and protection system, but is instead a more generalized idea.

The starting point of the white paper is that of a side-channel timing attack applied to the branch prediction machinery of modern microprocessors with speculative execution. At the architectural level documented in processor data books, any results of misprediction are specified to be discarded. However, the speculative execution may still leave side effects, such as loaded cache lines. These can then affect the so-called non-functional aspects of the computing environment later on. If such side effects, including but not limited to memory access timing, are visible to a malicious program and can be engineered to depend on sensitive data held by the victim process, then these side effects can result in such data becoming discernible. This can happen despite the formal architecture-level security arrangements working as designed; in this case, lower, microarchitecture-level optimizations to code execution can leak information not essential to the correctness of normal program execution.

The Spectre paper explains the attack in four essential steps:

1. First, it shows that branch prediction logic in modern processors can be trained to reliably hit or miss based on the internal workings of a malicious program.
2. It then goes on to show that the subsequent differences between cache hits and misses can be reliably timed, such that what should have been a simple non-functional timing difference can in fact be subverted into a covert channel that extracts information from an unrelated process's inner workings.
3. Thirdly, the paper synthesizes the results with return-oriented programming exploits and other principles with a simple example program and a JavaScript snippet run under a sandboxing browser; in both cases, the entire address space of the victim process (i.e. the contents of a running program) is shown to be readable by simply exploiting speculative execution of conditional branches in code generated by a stock compiler or the JavaScript machinery present in an existing browser. The basic idea is to search existing code for places where speculation touches upon otherwise inaccessible data, manipulate the processor into a state where speculative execution has to contact that data, and then time the side effect of the processor being faster, if its by-now-prepared prefetch machinery indeed did load a cache line.
4. Finally, the paper concludes by generalizing the attack to any non-functional state of the victim process. It briefly discusses highly non-obvious, non-functional effects such as bus arbitration latency.

== Variants ==
=== Spectre Variant 1 ===
Spectre Variant 1, also called Bounds Check Bypass, is an exploit of CPU speculative execution in conditional branches related to memory access bounds. This occurs because the CPU speculatively accesses memory with specific bounds, such as arrays, leading to a bounds bypass (out-of-bounds index access). This speculative execution happens before the CPU validates the bounds check or reverts after a misprediction occurs, resulting in a side-channel leakage.

This attack is the result of conditional branch misprediction, which causes a vulnerable processor to speculatively access out-of-bounds data before the access is validated and before any exception arises.

=== Spectre Variant 2 ===
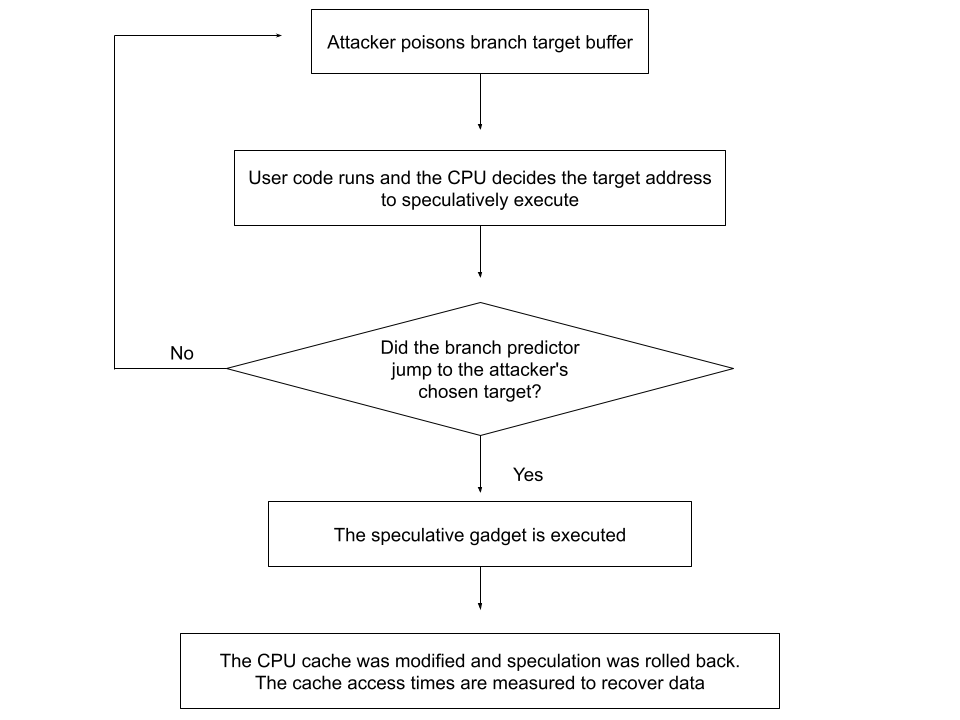
Abstract flowchart depicting how the Spectre Variant 2 vulnerability works

Spectre Variant 2, also called Branch Target Injection (BTI), is an exploitation of the CPU's speculative execution of indirect branches, unlike Spectre Variant 1, which is related to conditional branches. This vulnerability arises due to misprediction by the indirect branch predictor.

This vulnerability differs from Variant 1 because indirect branches are branches whose targets are unknown at compile time and need to be resolved dynamically. An attacker can poison the branch target buffer, causing the indirect branch predictor to mispredict and redirect execution to locations that the program's control flow would never legitimately reach.

==== Branch History Injection ====
Branch History Injection (BHI), also known as Spectre-BHB, was disclosed in 2022 by researchers at Vrije Universiteit Amsterdam. Hardware mitigations such as Intel's eIBRS and Arm's CSV2 isolate the branch target state across privilege domains, but this isolation does not extend to the branch history state that the predictor also uses, which re-enables cross-privilege Spectre Variant 2 attacks. The researchers demonstrated exploits leaking kernel memory from user space on Intel systems at 160 bytes per second and concluded that software defenses such as retpoline remained the only practical mitigations. The paper received an honorable mention in the 2024 Intel Hardware Security Academic Award.

=== Remote exploitation ===
While Spectre is simpler to exploit with a compiled language such as C or C++ by locally executing machine code, it can also be remotely exploited by code hosted on remote malicious web pages, for example, interpreted languages like JavaScript, which run locally using a web browser. The scripted malware would then have access to all the memory mapped to the address space of the running browser. The exploit using remote JavaScript follows a similar flow to that of a local machine code exploit: flush cache → mistrain branch predictor → timed reads (tracking hits and misses).

The clflush instruction (cache-line flush) cannot be used directly from JavaScript, so flushing the cache requires another approach. There are several automatic cache eviction policies that the CPU may choose, and the attack relies on being able to force that eviction for the exploit to work. It was found that using a second index on the large array, which was kept several iterations behind the first index, would cause the least recently used (LRU) policy to be invoked. This allows the exploit to effectively clear the cache just by doing incremental reads on a large dataset. Careful coding and analysis of the machine code executed by the just-in-time compilation (JIT) compiler was required to ensure the cache-clearing and exploitive reads were not optimized out. The branch predictor would then be mistrained by iterating over a very large dataset using bitwise operations for setting the index to in-range values, and then using an out-of-bounds address for the final iteration. A high-precision timer would then be required in order to determine if a set of reads led to a cache hit or a cache miss. While browsers like Chrome, Firefox have restrictions on the resolution of timers, the Spectre author was able to create a high-precision timer using the web worker feature (specifically SharedArrayBuffer) of HTML5.

== Impact ==
As of 2018, almost every computer system is affected by Spectre, including desktops, laptops, and mobile devices. Specifically, Spectre has been shown to work on Intel, AMD, ARM-based, and IBM processors. Intel responded to the reported security vulnerabilities with an official statement. AMD originally acknowledged vulnerability to one of the Spectre variants (GPZ variant 1), but stated that vulnerability to another (GPZ variant 2) had not been demonstrated on AMD processors, claiming it posed a "near zero risk of exploitation" due to differences in AMD architecture. In an update nine days later, AMD said that "GPZ Variant 2 ... is applicable to AMD processors" and defined upcoming steps to mitigate the threat. Several sources took AMD's news of the vulnerability to GPZ variant 2 as a change from AMD's prior claim, though AMD maintained that its position had not changed.

Researchers have indicated that the Spectre vulnerability can possibly affect some Intel, AMD, and ARM processors. Specifically, processors with speculative execution are affected by these vulnerabilities.

ARM has reported that the majority of their processors are not vulnerable, and published a list of the specific processors that are affected by the Spectre vulnerability: Cortex-R7, Cortex-R8, Cortex-A8, Cortex-A9, Cortex-A15, Cortex-A17, Cortex-A57, Cortex-A72, Cortex-A73 and ARM Cortex-A75 cores. Other manufacturers' custom CPU cores implementing the ARM instruction set, such as those found in newer members of the Apple A series processors, have also been reported to be vulnerable. In general, higher-performance CPUs tend to have intensive speculative execution, making them vulnerable to Spectre.

Spectre has the potential of having a greater impact on cloud providers than Meltdown. Whereas Meltdown allows unauthorized applications to read from privileged memory to obtain sensitive data from processes running on the same cloud server, Spectre can allow malicious programs to induce a hypervisor to transmit the data to a guest system running on top of it.

== Mitigation ==
Since Spectre represents a whole class of attacks, a single patch is unlikely to address all vulnerabilities. While work is already being done to address special cases of the vulnerability, the original website devoted to Spectre and Meltdown states, "As [Spectre] is not easy to fix, it will haunt us for a long time." At the same time, according to Dell, "No 'real-world' exploits of these vulnerabilities [i.e., Meltdown and Spectre] have been reported to date [7 February 2018], though researchers have produced proof-of-concepts."

Several procedures to help protect home computers and related devices from the vulnerability have been published. Spectre patches have been reported to significantly reduce performance, especially on older computers; on the eighth-generation Core platforms, benchmark performance drops of 2–14 percent have been measured.

In early January 2018, Chris Hoffman of the website HowToGeek suggested that the fix would require "a complete hardware redesign for CPUs across the board" and noted how, once software fixes were released, slowdowns on patched computers were expected.

As early as 2018, machine learning has been employed to detect attacks in real time. This has led to an arms race where attackers also employ machine learning to thwart machine learning-based detectors, and detectors in turn employ Generative Adversarial Networks to adapt detection techniques.

On 4 January 2018, Google detailed a new technique on their security blog called "Retpoline" (a portmanteau of return and trampoline) which can overcome the Spectre vulnerability with a negligible amount of processor overhead. It involves compiler-level steering of indirect branches towards a different target that does not result in a vulnerable speculative out-of-order execution taking place. While it was developed for the x86 instruction set, Google engineers believe the technique is transferable to other processors as well.

On 25 January 2018, the current status and possible future considerations in solving the Meltdown and Spectre vulnerabilities were presented.

In March 2018, Intel announced that it had developed hardware fixes for Meltdown and Spectre-V2 only, but not Spectre-V1. The vulnerabilities were mitigated by a new partitioning system that improves process and privilege-level separation.

On 8 October 2018, Intel is reported to have added hardware and firmware mitigations regarding Spectre and Meltdown vulnerabilities to its Coffee Lake-R processors and onwards.

On 18 October 2018, MIT researchers suggested a new mitigation approach, called DAWG (Dynamically Allocated Way Guard), which may promise better security without compromising performance.

On 16 April 2019, researchers from UC San Diego and the University of Virginia proposed Context-Sensitive Fencing, a microcode-based defense mechanism that surgically injects fences into the dynamic execution stream, protecting against a number of Spectre variants with just an 8% degradation in performance.

On 26 November 2021, researchers from Texas A&M University and Intel showed that Spectre attacks (and other families of transient attacks) cannot be detected by typical antivirus or anti-malware software before they leak data. They show that it is easy to engineer evasive versions of these attacks to build malware.

On 20 October 2022, researchers from North Carolina State University, UC San Diego and Intel announced that they were able to design the first machine learning detection technology that can detect transient attacks before leakage in the microarchitecture layer. This technology is also equipped with adversarial training, making it immune to a large category of adversarial and evasive versions of the Spectre attack.

=== Linux ===
When Intel announced that Spectre mitigation can be switched on as a "security feature" instead of being an always-on bugfix, Linux creator Linus Torvalds called the patches "complete and utter garbage". Ingo Molnár then suggested the use of function tracing machinery in the Linux kernel to fix Spectre without Indirect Branch Restricted Speculation (IBRS) microcode support. This would, as a result, only have a performance impact on processors based on Intel Skylake and newer architectures. This ftrace and retpoline-based machinery was incorporated into Linux 4.15 and released in January 2018. The Linux kernel provides a sysfs interface to enumerate the current status of the system regarding Spectre in /sys/devices/system/cpu/vulnerabilities/

=== Microsoft Windows ===
On 2 March 2019, Microsoft released Windows 10 software mitigation to the Spectre v2 CPU vulnerability.

Summary of mitigations on Microsoft Windows
Vulnerability	CVE	Exploit name	Public vulnerability name	Windows changes	Firmware changes	Refs
Spectre	CVE-2017-5753	Variant 1	Bounds Check Bypass (BCB)	Recompiling with a new compiler Hardened browser to prevent exploit from JavaScript	No	
Spectre	CVE-2017-5715	Variant 2	Branch Target Injection (BTI)	New CPU instructions eliminating branch speculation	Yes	
Meltdown	CVE-2017-5754	Variant 3	Rogue Data Cache Load (RDCL)	Isolate kernel and user mode page tables	No	
Spectre-NG	CVE-2018-3640	Variant 3a	Rogue System Register Read (RSRR)		Yes	
Spectre-NG	CVE-2018-3639	Variant 4	Speculative Store Bypass (SSB)		Yes	
Spectre-NG	CVE-2018-3665		Lazy FP State Restore			
Spectre-NG	CVE-2018-3693	Variant 1.1	Bounds Check Bypass Store (BCBS)			
Spectre		Variant 1.2	Read-only protection bypass (RPB)			
SpectreRSB			Return Mispredict			
Spectre-HD			Speculative Vectorization Exploit (SRV)			

=== Other software ===
Several procedures to help protect home computers and related devices from the vulnerability have been published.

Initial mitigation efforts were not entirely without incident. At first, Spectre patches were reported to significantly reduce performance, especially on older computers. On the eighth generation Core platforms, benchmark performance drops of 2–14 percent were measured. On 18 January 2018, unwanted reboots were reported even for newer Intel chips.

Since exploitation of Spectre through JavaScript embedded in websites is possible, it was planned to include mitigations against the attack by default in Chrome 64. Chrome 63 users could manually mitigate the attack by enabling the site isolation feature (chrome://flags#enable-site-per-process).

As of Firefox 57.0.4, Mozilla was reducing the resolution of JavaScript timers to help prevent timing attacks, with additional work on time-fuzzing techniques planned for future releases.

On January 15, 2018, Microsoft introduced mitigation for Spectre in Visual Studio.

== Immune hardware ==
- ARM:
  - A55
  - A53
  - A32
  - A7
  - A5
- x86:
  - Intel Atom N270 / N280
  - i486 and older
- IA-64:
  - Intel Itanium
- RISC-V:
  - SiFive Freedom U740
- SPARC:
  - UltraSPARC T2 and earlier

== See also ==
- Row hammer
- SPOILER (security vulnerability)
