= Speculative execution =

Technique used in processor design

In computer science and processor design, speculative execution or speculation is a design characteristic where a processor is able to perform potentially useful work by guessing what work is needed next, compute them prematurely, and immediately applying or discarding the results when the work's necessity is eventually known. Since the 21st century, speculation is commonly seen on superscalar central processors (CPUs), as an optimization technique to increase its performance. It is often used in combination with branch prediction to increase the accuracy of the guessing process.

== Overview ==
In speculative execution, work is done before it is known whether it is actually needed, so as to prevent a delay that would have to be incurred by doing the work after it is known that it is needed. If it turns out the work was not needed after all, most changes made by the work are reverted and the results are ignored.

The objective is to provide more concurrency if extra resources are available. This approach is employed in a variety of areas, including branch prediction in pipelined processors, value prediction for exploiting value locality, prefetching memory and files, and optimistic concurrency control in database systems.

Since the results from speculative execution become useless when the guessed work turns out to be wrong (e.g., not needed), its performance benefits are limited by the accuracy of the prediction process.

Speculative multithreading is a special case of speculative execution.

Modern pipelined microprocessors use speculative execution to reduce the cost of conditional branch instructions using schemes that predict the execution path of a program based on the history of branch executions. In order to improve performance and utilization of computer resources, instructions can be scheduled at a time when it has not yet been determined that the instructions will need to be executed, ahead of a branch.

== Variants ==
Speculative computation was a related earlier concept.

=== Eager execution ===
Eager execution is a form of speculative execution where both sides of the conditional branch are executed; however, the results are committed only if the predicate is true. With unlimited resources, eager execution (also known as oracle execution) would in theory provide the same performance as perfect branch prediction. With limited resources, eager execution should be employed carefully, since the number of resources needed grows exponentially with each level of branch executed eagerly.

=== Predictive execution ===
Predictive execution is a form of speculative execution where some outcome is predicted and execution proceeds along the predicted path until the actual result is known. If the prediction is true, the predicted execution is allowed to commit; however, if there is a misprediction, execution has to be unrolled and re-executed. Common forms of this include branch predictors and memory dependence prediction. A generalized form is sometimes referred to as value prediction.

=== Runahead ===
In computer science and processor design, runahead is a technique that allows a computer processor to speculatively pre-process instructions during cache miss cycles. The pre-processed instructions are used to generate instruction and data stream prefetches by executing instructions leading to cache misses (typically called long latency loads) before they would normally occur, effectively hiding memory latency. In runahead, the processor uses the idle execution resources to calculate instruction and data stream addresses using the available information that is independent of a cache miss. Once the processor has resolved the initial cache miss, all runahead results are discarded, and the processor resumes execution as normal. The primary use case of the technique is to mitigate the effects of the memory wall. The technique may also be used for other purposes, such as pre-computing branch outcomes to achieve highly accurate branch prediction.

== Related concepts ==
=== Lazy execution ===
Lazy execution is the opposite of eager execution, and does not involve speculation. The incorporation of speculative execution into implementations of the Haskell programming language, a lazy language, is a current research topic. Eager Haskell, a variant of the language, is designed around the idea of speculative execution. A 2003 PhD thesis made GHC support a kind of speculative execution with an abortion mechanism to back out in case of a bad choice called optimistic execution. It was deemed too complicated.

== Security vulnerabilities ==
Starting in 2017, a series of security vulnerabilities were found in the implementations of speculative execution on common processor architectures which effectively enabled an elevation of privileges.

These include:

- Foreshadow
- Meltdown
- Microarchitectural Data Sampling
- Spectre
- SPOILER
- Pacman

== See also ==
- Anticiparallelism
- Out-of-order execution
- Slipstream (computer science)
- Speculative multithreading
- Hardware security bug
- Transient execution CPU vulnerability
