= Hardware security =

Security architecture implemented in hardware

Hardware security is a discipline originated from the cryptographic engineering and involves hardware design, access control, secure multi-party computation, secure key storage, ensuring code authenticity, measures to ensure that the supply chain that built the product is secure among other things.

A hardware security module (HSM) is a physical computing device that safeguards and manages digital keys for strong authentication and provides cryptoprocessing. These modules traditionally come in the form of a plug-in card or an external device that attaches directly to a computer or network server.

Some providers in this discipline consider that the key difference between hardware security and software security is that hardware security is implemented using "non-Turing-machine" logic (raw combinatorial logic or simple state machines). One approach, referred to as "hardsec", uses FPGAs to implement non-Turing-machine security controls as a way of combining the security of hardware with the flexibility of software.

Hardware backdoors are backdoors in hardware. Conceptionally related, a hardware Trojan (HT) is a malicious modification of electronic system, particularly in the context of integrated circuit.

A physical unclonable function (PUF) is a physical entity that is embodied in a physical structure and is easy to evaluate but hard to predict. Further, an individual PUF device must be easy to make but practically impossible to duplicate, even given the exact manufacturing process that produced it. In this respect it is the hardware analog of a one-way function. The name "physical unclonable function" might be a little misleading as some PUFs are clonable, and most PUFs are noisy and therefore do not achieve the requirements for a function. Today, PUFs are usually implemented in integrated circuits and are typically used in applications with high security requirements.

Many attacks on sensitive data and resources reported by organizations occur from within the organization itself.

== See also ==
- U.S. NRC, 10 CFR 73.54 Cybersecurity - Protection of digital computer and communication systems and networks
- NEI 08-09: Cybersecurity Plan for Nuclear Power Plants
- Computer security compromised by hardware failure
- Intel Hardware Security Academic Award
- Computer compatibility
  - Proprietary software
  - Free and open-source software
    - Comparison of open-source operating systems
    - Unified Extensible Firmware Interface § Secure Boot criticism
- Trusted Computing
- Computational trust
- Fingerprint (computing)
- Side-channel attack
  - Power analysis
  - Electromagnetic attack
  - Acoustic cryptanalysis
  - Timing attack
- Supply chain security
- List of computer hardware manufacturers
- Consumer protection
- Security switch
- Vulnerability (computing)
- Turing completeness
- Universal Turing machine
- Finite-state machine
- Automata theory
- Hardware bug
- Hardware security bug
