= Acoustical intelligence =

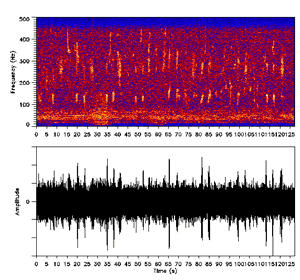
Acoustical intelligence

Acoustical intelligence (ACOUSTINT, sometimes ACINT) is an intelligence gathering discipline that collects and processes acoustic phenomena. It is a subdiscipline of MASINT (measurement and signature intelligence).

This uses broadband and narrowband analysis of acquired acoustic signatures from surface ships and submarines, although it can also be used for low-flying aircraft such as helicopters. Broadband analysis concerns the overall noise created by a platform, whereas narrowband analysis examines the spectra of the received energy at a more precise level.

Broadband analysis is useful for identifying any vessel at a long range, whereas narrowband analysis is generally more useful for identifying the category, type and ideally the individual vessel name. The category might be, for example, differentiating between a commercial vessel and a warship; the type might be narrowing this down to an individual class and hence identifying nationality, and the individual name might identify the specific ship or submarine.

As a simple example, narrowband analysis might identify whether a subject of interest has single or multiple propeller shafts; how many blades per shaft and other salients that may help identify the platform. This may include the fundamental or harmonic emissions based on the electric services used, the gearing between shaft and engine and also the combination of gear teeth used in the ratio(s). For nuclear vessels, necessary pump frequencies can be detected. It is possible for an expert to work out how many gears, teeth and ratios are used from engine right through to propeller; this can be used to identify a particular type. Sometimes, there are machining faults – however small – introduced at the manufacturing stage. This can help to identify individual platforms.

== See also ==
- Acoustic cryptanalysis
