= Cache timing attack =

Class of cybersecurity attacks

Cache timing attacks also known as Cache attacks are a type of side-channel attack that allows attackers to gain information about a system purely by tracking cache access made by the victim system in a shared environment.
