= Pixel stealing attack =

Web security attack

In cybersecurity, pixel stealing attacks are a group of timing side-channel attacks that allow cross-origin websites to infer how a particular pixel is displayed to the user.

== History ==
One of the earliest known instances of a pixel-stealing attack was described by Paul Stone in a white paper presented at the Black Hat Briefings conference in 2013. Stone's approach exploited a quirk in how browsers rendered images encoded in the SVG format. SVG images support various features, including the ability to apply SVG filters that applies transform image content. Stone discovered that by measuring the time it took for a browser to render a morphological filter over a known set of pixels and then comparing this with the time taken to render the same filter over a pixel from an unknown website, he could infer the color of the pixels. This allowed him to build a grayscale image of the other website which could be then used to leak information about the website.

More than a decade later, the technique was extended beyond web browsers. In 2025, researchers introduced an Android-based variant called Pixnapping, which showed that a malicious app could infer on-screen pixel values from other applications. By exploiting how Android composites and renders overlapping windows, the attack used transparent overlays and timing differences in GPU processing to recover sensitive information such as two-factor authentication codes or displayed text.
