= Intel Core =

Line of CPUs produced by Intel

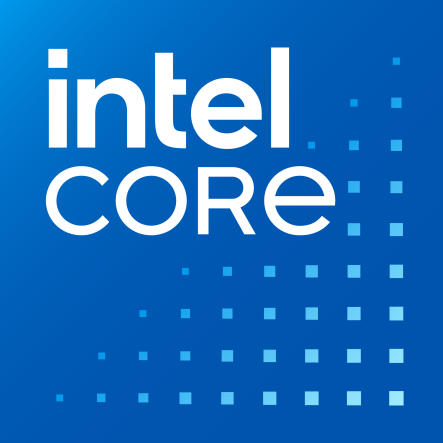
- Logo since 2023

General information
- Launched: January 2006; 20 years ago
- Marketed by: Intel
- Designed by: Intel
- Common manufacturers: Intel; TSMC

Performance
- Max. CPU clock rate: 400 MHz to 6.2 GHz

Physical specifications
- Cores: P-cores: 2–10; E-cores: 4–16; Total: 1-24
- GPU: Intel Graphics Technology
- Sockets: LGA 775; LGA 1156; LGA 1155; LGA 1150; LGA 1151; LGA 1151-2; LGA 1200; LGA 1356 (FCBGA); LGA 1700; LGA 1851

Cache
- L1 cache: Up to 112 KB per P-core; 96 KB per E-core or LP E-core
- L2 cache: Core and Core 2: Up to 12 MB; Nehalem-present: Up to 2 MB per P-core and up to 3 MB per E-core cluster
- L3 cache: Up to 36 MB

Architecture and classification
- Technology node: 65 nm to Intel 4 and TSMC N5
- Microarchitecture: Core; Nehalem; Westmere; Sandy Bridge; Ivy Bridge; Haswell; Broadwell; Skylake; Sunny Cove; Willow Cove; Cypress Cove; Golden Cove; Raptor Cove; Gracemont; Redwood Cove; Crestmont
- Instruction set: x86-64
- Instructions: MMX, SSE, SSE2, SSE3, SSSE3, SSE4.1, SSE4.2, AVX, AVX2, AVX-512, TSX, AES-NI, FMA3, AVX-VNNI
- Extensions: EIST, TXT, VT-x, VT-d, SHA, ~~SGX~~

Products, models, variants
- Brand names: Core; Core 2; Core i3/i5/i7/i9; Core 3/5/7; Core Ultra 5/7/9
- Variant: Intel Processor (budget CPUs)

History
- Predecessors: Pentium; Celeron

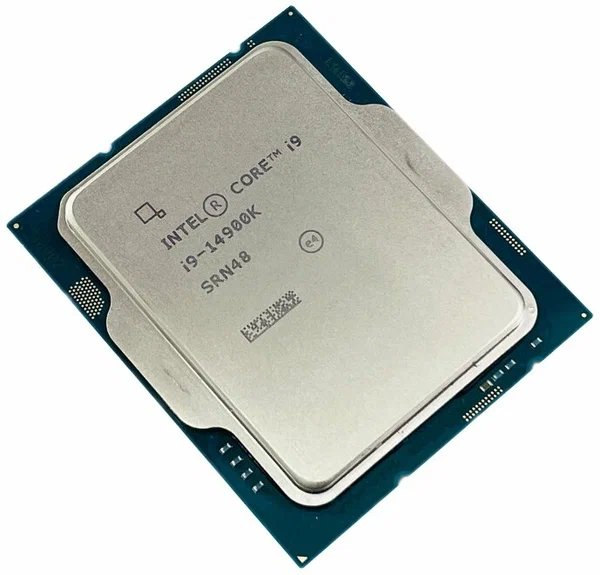
A flagship model, the Intel Core i9-14900K

Intel Core is a line of multi-core (with the exeption of Core Solo and Core 2 Solo) central processing units (CPUs) for midrange, embedded, workstation, high-end, enthusiast, gaming computer and entry-level server markets marketed by Intel Corporation. These processors displaced the existing mid- to high-end Pentium processors at the time of their introduction, moving the Pentium to the mid-range budget market. Identical or more capable versions of Core processors are also sold as Xeon processors for the server and workstation markets.

Core was launched in January 2006 as a mobile-only series, consisting of single-core and dual-core models. It was then succeeded later in July by the Core 2 series, which included both desktop and mobile processors with up to four cores, and introduced 64-bit support.

A new naming scheme was introduced in 2023, consisting of Core 3, Core 5, and Core 7 for mid-range to high-end processors, and Core Ultra 5, Core Ultra 7, and Core Ultra 9 for super-high-end processors, respectively succeeding the Core i3, i5, i7, and i9, which had been manufactured for desktops and laptops from 2008 to 2024.

== Overview ==
Although Intel Core is a brand that promises no internal consistency or continuity, the processors within this family have been broadly similar.

The first products receiving this designation were the Core Solo and Core Duo Yonah processors for mobile from the Pentium M design tree, fabricated at 65 nm and brought to market in January 2006. These are substantially different in design than the rest of the Intel Core product group, having derived from the Pentium Pro lineage that predated Pentium 4.

The first Intel Core desktop processor—and typical family member—came from the Conroe iteration, a 65 nm dual-core design brought to market in July 2006, based on the Intel Core microarchitecture with substantial enhancements in micro-architectural efficiency and performance, outperforming Pentium 4 across the board (or near to it), while operating at drastically lower clock rates. Maintaining high instructions per cycle (IPC) on a deeply pipelined and resourced out-of-order execution engine has remained a constant fixture of the Intel Core product group ever since.

The new substantial bump in microarchitecture came with the introduction of the 45 nm Bloomfield desktop processor in November 2008 on the Nehalem architecture, whose main advantage came from redesigned I/O and memory systems featuring the new Intel QuickPath Interconnect and an integrated memory controller supporting up to three channels of DDR3 memory.

Subsequent performance improvements have tended toward making additions rather than profound changes, such as adding the Advanced Vector Extensions (AVX) instruction set extensions to Sandy Bridge, first released on 32 nm in January 2011. Time has also brought improved support for virtualization and a trend toward higher levels of system integration and management functionality (and along with that, increased performance) through the ongoing evolution of facilities such as Intel Active Management Technology (iAMT).

As of 2017, the Core brand comprised four product lines – the entry level i3, the mainstream i5, the high-end i7, and the "enthusiast" i9. Core i7 was introduced in 2008, followed by i5 in 2009, and i3 in 2010. The first Core i9 models were released in 2017.

In June 2023, Intel announced that the letter (or moniker) "i" in Core branding would be dropped, making it "Core 3/5/7/9". The company would introduce the "Ultra" branding for high-end processors as well. The new naming scheme debuted with the launch of Raptor Lake-U Refresh and Meteor Lake processors in 2024, using the "Core 3/5/7" branding for mainstream processors and "Core Ultra 5/7/9" branding for "premium" high-end processor.

Comparison of Intel Core microarchitectures
Microarchitecture				Core		Nehalem	Sandy Bridge	Haswell	Broadwell	Skylake	Sunny Cove (Note: Rocket Lake based on Cypress Cove is a CPU microarchitecture, a variant of Sunny Cove microarchitecture designed for 10 nm, backported to 14 nm.)	Willow Cove	Golden Cove	Raptor Cove
Microarchitecture variants				Merom	Penryn	Westmere	Ivy Bridge	Haswell	Broadwell	Kaby Lake; Coffee Lake; Comet Lake	Ice Lake; Rocket Lake	Tiger Lake	Alder Lake; Sapphire Rapids	Raptor Lake; Emerald Rapids
Generation (Core i)				-	-	1st	2nd/3rd	4th	5th/6th	6th/7th/8th/9th	10th/11th	11th	12th	13th/14th
Year of inception				2006	2007	2010	2011	2013	2014	2015	2019	2020	2021	2022
Fabrication process (nm)				65	45		32/22	22	14	14+/14++/14+++	10	10SF	10ESF	
Cache	μop			—N/a			1.5K μops				2.25K μops		4K μops	
Cache	L1	Data	Size	32 KB/core							48 KB/core			
Cache	L1	Data	Ways	8 way							12 way			
Cache	L1	Data	Latency	3		4					3/5	?	5	?
Cache	L1	Instruction	Size	32 KB/core										
Cache	L1	Instruction	ways	8 way		4 way	8 way				?	?	8 way	?
Cache	L1	Instruction	Latency	3			?	?	?	4	5	?	?	?
Cache	L1	TLB		?	?	142	144	?	?	?	?	?	?	?
Cache	L2		Size	2-3 MB/core		256 KB					512 KB	1.25 MB	2 MB (Note: 1.25 MB in client)	
Cache	L2		ways	8 way					4 way	8 way	20 way	10 way		?
Cache	L2		Latency	?	?	?	12				13	?	14	?
Cache	L2		TLB	?	?	?	?	1024	?	1536	2048	?	?	?
Cache	L3		Size			2 MB						3 MB		?
Cache	L3		ways			16 way						12 way		
Cache	L3		Latency			?	?	?	?	26-37	30-36	43	74	?
Cache	L4		Size	None				0–128 MB			None	?	?	?
Cache	L4		ways	None				?	16	?	None	?	?	?
Cache	L4		Latency	None				?	?	?	None	?	?	?
Cache	L4		Type	None				GPU Memory only		cache	None	?	?	?
Hyper-threading				No		Yes								
OoOE window				96		128	168	192		224	352	?	512	?
In-flight			Load	?	?	48	64	72			128	?	192	?
In-flight			Store	?	?	32	36	42		56	72	?	114	?
Scheduler			Entries	32		36	54	60	64	97	160	?	?	?
Scheduler			Dispatch	?	?	?	?	?	?	8 way	10 way	?	?	?
Register file			Integer	?	?	?	160	168		?	280	?	280	?
Register file			Floating-point	?	?	?	144	168		?	224	?	332	?
Queue			Instruction	?	?	18/thread	20/thread	20/thread	25/thread	?	?	?	?	?
Queue			Allocation	?	?	28/thread (Note: 56 unified in Ivy Bridge)		56		64/thread	?	?	?	?
Decode				?	?	?	?	?	?	4 + 1		?	6	?
Execution Ports			Numbers	?	?	6		8		8	10	?	12	?
Execution Ports			Port 0			Integer; FP Mul; Branch	Integer; FP Mul; Branch	?	?	?	?	?	?	?
Execution Ports			Port 1	?	?	Integer; FP Mul	Integer; FP Mul	?	?	?	?	?	?	?
Execution Ports			Port 2	?	?	Load; Address	Load; Store; Address	?	?	?	?	?	?	?
Execution Ports			Port 3	?	?	Store Address	Store; Load; Address	?	?	?	?	?	?	?
Execution Ports			Port 4	?	?	Store Data	Store Data	?	?	?	?	?	?	?
Execution Ports			Port 5	?	?	Integer	?	?	?	?	?	?	?	?
Execution Ports			Port 6	—N/a				Integer; Branch		?	?	?	?	?
Execution Ports			Port 7	—N/a				Store Address		?	?	?	?	?
AGUs				?	?	?	?	?	?	2 + 1	2 + 2	?	?	?
Instructions			SSE2	Yes										
Instructions			SSE3	Yes										
Instructions			SSE4	—N/a	Yes									
Instructions			AVX	—N/a			Yes							
Instructions			AVX2	—N/a				Yes						
Instructions			FMA	—N/a				Yes						
Instructions			AVX512	—N/a						Yes/No	Yes		Yes/No	
μArchitecture				Merom	Penryn	Nehalem	Sandy Bridge	Haswell	Broadwell	Skylake	Ice Lake	Tiger Lake	Alder Lake	Raptor Lake

Overview of Intel Core microarchitectures
Brand	Desktop				Mobile			
Brand	Codename	Cores	Process	Date released	Codename	Cores	Process	Date released
Core Solo	Desktop version not available				Yonah	1	65 nm	January 2006
Core Duo	Desktop version not available				Yonah	2	65 nm	January 2006
Core 2 Solo	Desktop version not available				Merom-L; Penryn-L	1; 1	65 nm 45 nm	September 2007; May 2008
Core 2 Duo	Conroe; Allendale; Wolfdale	2; 2; 2	65 nm 65 nm 45 nm	August 2006; January 2007; January 2008	Merom; Penryn	2; 2	65 nm 45 nm	July 2006; January 2008
Core 2 Quad	Kentsfield; Yorkfield	4; 4	65 nm 45 nm	January 2007; March 2008	Penryn QC	4	45 nm	August 2008
Core 2 Extreme	Conroe XE; Kentsfield XE; Yorkfield XE	2; 4; 4	65 nm 65 nm 45 nm	July 2006; November 2006; November 2007	Merom XE; Penryn XE; Penryn QC XE	2; 2; 4	65 nm 45 nm 45 nm	July 2007; January 2008; August 2008
Core M	Desktop version not available				Broadwell	2	14 nm	September 2014
Core m3	Desktop version not available				Skylake; Kaby Lake; Kaby Lake; Amber Lake	2; 2; 2; 2	14 nm 14 nm 14 nm 14 nm	August 2015; September 2016; April 2017; August 2018
Core m5	Desktop version not available				Skylake	2	14 nm	August 2015
Core m7	Desktop version not available				Skylake	2	14 nm	August 2015
Core i3	Clarkdale; Sandy Bridge; Ivy Bridge; Haswell; Skylake; Kaby Lake; Coffee Lake; Coffee Lake; Comet Lake; Alder Lake; Raptor Lake	2; 2; 2; 2; 2; 2; 4; 4; 4; 4; 4	32 nm 32 nm 22 nm 22 nm 14 nm 14 nm 14 nm 14 nm 14 nm Intel 7 Intel 7	January 2010; February 2011; September 2012; September 2013; September 2015; January 2017; October 2017; Jan. & April 2019; April 2020; January 2022; Jan. 2023 & 2024	Arrandale; Sandy Bridge; Ivy Bridge; Haswell; Broadwell; Skylake; Kaby Lake; Skylake; Kaby Lake; Coffee Lake; Cannon Lake; Coffee Lake; Whiskey Lake; Ice Lake; Comet Lake; Tiger Lake / B Alder Lake; Raptor Lake; Meteor Lake	2; 2; 2; 2; 2; 2; 2; 2; 2; 2; 2; 4; 2; 2; 2; 2-4; 6-8; 5-6; 8	32 nm 32 nm 22 nm 22 nm 14 nm 14 nm 14 nm 14 nm 14 nm 14 nm 10 nm 14 nm 14 nm 10 nm 14 nm 10 nm Intel 7 Intel 7 Intel 4	January 2010; February 2011; June 2012; June 2013; January 2015; Sept. 2015 & June 2016; August 2016; November 2016; Jan. & June 2017; April 2018; May 2018; July 2018; August 2018; May & Aug. 2019; September 2019; Sept. 2020, Jan. - May 2021; January 2022; Jan. 2023 & 2024; April 2024
Core i5	Lynnfield; Clarkdale; Sandy Bridge; Sandy Bridge; Ivy Bridge; Haswell; Broadwell; Skylake; Kaby Lake; Coffee Lake; Coffee Lake; Comet Lake; Rocket Lake; Alder Lake; Raptor Lake	4; 2; 4; 2; 2-4; 2-4; 4; 4; 4; 6; 6; 6; 6; 6-10; 10-14	45 nm 32 nm 32 nm 32 nm 22 nm 22 nm 14 nm 14 nm 14 nm 14 nm 14 nm 14 nm 14 nm Intel 7 Intel 7	September 2009; January 2010; January 2011; February 2011; April 2012; June 2013; June 2015; September 2015; January 2017; October 2017; Oct. 2018 & Jan. 2019; April 2020; March 2021; Nov. 2021 & Jan. 2022; Jan. 2023/2024 & Oct. 2023/2024	Arrandale; Sandy Bridge; Ivy Bridge; Haswell; Broadwell; Skylake; Kaby Lake; Kaby Lake; Kaby Lake-R; Coffee Lake; Amber Lake; Whiskey Lake; Ice Lake; Comet Lake; Comet Lake-H; Tiger Lake; Tiger Lake-H/B; Alder Lake; Alder Lake-H/HX; Raptor Lake; Meteor Lake	2; 2; 2; 2; 2; 2; 2; 4; 4; 4; 2; 4; 4; 4; 4; 4; 4-6; 10-12; 8-12; 6-12; 8-14	32 nm 32 nm 22 nm 22 nm 14 nm 14 nm 14 nm 14 nm 14 nm 14 nm 14 nm 14 nm 10 nm 14 nm 14 nm 10 nm 10 nm Intel 7 Intel 7 Intel 7 Intel 4	January 2010; February 2011; May 2012; June 2013; January 2015; September 2015; August 2016; January 2017; October 2017; April 2018; Aug. 2018 & Oct. 2018; Aug. 2018 & April 2019; May & Aug. 2019; September 2019; April 2020; Sept. 2020 – May 2021; January – September 2021; January 2022; January & May 2022; Jan. 2023 & 2024; Dec. 2023 & Apr. 2024
Core i7	Bloomfield; Lynnfield; Gulftown; Sandy Bridge; Sandy Bridge-E; Sandy Bridge-E; Ivy Bridge; Haswell; Ivy Bridge-E; Broadwell; Skylake; Kaby Lake; Coffee Lake; Coffee Lake; Comet Lake; Rocket Lake; Alder Lake; Raptor Lake	4; 4; 6; 4; 6; 4; 4; 4; 4-6; 4; 4; 4; 6; 8; 8; 8; 12; 16-20	45 nm 45 nm 32 nm 32 nm 32 nm 32 nm 22 nm 22 nm 22 nm 14 nm 14 nm 14 nm 14 nm 14 nm 14 nm 14 nm Intel 7 Intel 7	November 2008; September 2009; July 2010; January 2011; November 2011; February 2012; April 2012; June 2013; September 2013; June 2015; August 2015; January 2017; October 2017; October 2018; April 2020; March 2021; Nov. 2021 & Jan. 2022; Jan. 2023/2024 & Oct. 2023/2024	Clarksfield; Arrandale; Sandy Bridge; Sandy Bridge; Ivy Bridge; Haswell; Broadwell; Broadwell; Skylake; Kaby Lake; Kaby Lake; Coffee Lake; Amber Lake; Whiskey Lake; Ice Lake; Comet Lake; Comet Lake-H; Tiger Lake; Tiger Lake-H/B; Alder Lake; Alder Lake-H/HX; Raptor Lake; Meteor Lake	4; 2; 4; 2; 2-4; 2-4; 2; 4; 2-4; 2; 4; 4-6; 2; 4; 4; 4-6; 6-8; 4; 4-8; 10-14; 10-16; 14-20; 12-16	45 nm 32 nm 32 nm 32 nm 22 nm 22 nm 14 nm 14 nm 14 nm 14 nm 14 nm 14 nm 14 nm 14 nm 10 nm 14 nm 14 nm 10 nm 10 nm Intel 7 Intel 7 Intel 7 Intel 4	September 2009; January 2010; January 2011; February 2011; May 2012; June 2013; January 2015; June 2015; September 2015; August 2016; January 2017; April 2018; August 2018; Aug. 2018 & April 2019; May & Aug. 2019; September 2019; April 2020; September 2020; January – September 2021; January 2022; January & May 2022; January 2023 & 2024; Dec. 2023 & Apr. 2024
Core i7 Extreme	Bloomfield; Gulftown; Sandy Bridge-E; Ivy Bridge-E; Haswell-E; Broadwell-E; Skylake-X; Kaby Lake-X	4; 6; 6; 6; 8; 10; 6-8; 4	45 nm 32 nm 32 nm 22 nm 22 nm 14 nm 14 nm 14 nm	November 2008; March 2010; November 2011; September 2013; August 2014; May 2016; June 2017; June 2017	Clarksfield; Sandy Bridge; Ivy Bridge; Haswell	4; 4; 4; 4	45 nm 32 nm 22 nm 22 nm	September 2009; January 2011; May 2012; June 2013
Core i9	Skylake-X; Skylake-X; Cascade Lake-X; Coffee Lake; Comet Lake; Rocket Lake; Alder Lake; Raptor Lake	10; 12; 14-18; 8; 10; 8; 16; 24	14 nm 14 nm 14 nm 14 nm 14 nm 14 nm Intel 7 Intel 7	June 2017; August 2017; September 2017; October 2018; April 2020; March 2021; Nov. 2021 & Jan. 2022; Oct. 2022 / Jan.&Oct. 2023	Coffee Lake-H; Comet Lake-H; Tiger Lake-H; Alder Lake-H/HX; Raptor Lake-H/HX; Meteor Lake-H	6; 8; 8; 14-16; 14-24; 16	14 nm 14 nm 10 nm Intel 7 Intel 7 Intel 4	April 2018; April 2020; May 2021; January & May 2022; January 2023 & 2024; December 2023
List of Intel Core processors

Intel Core sub-brand logos, from 2020 (coinciding with the release of its 11th generation) to 2023
Intel Core i3 logo

Intel Core i5 logo

Intel Core i7 logo

Intel Core i9 logo
The shade of blue in each logo gets darker depending on how advanced the sub-brand is.
Intel Core sub-brand logos, from 2023 to present (officially released with Raptor Lake-U Refresh in early 2024)
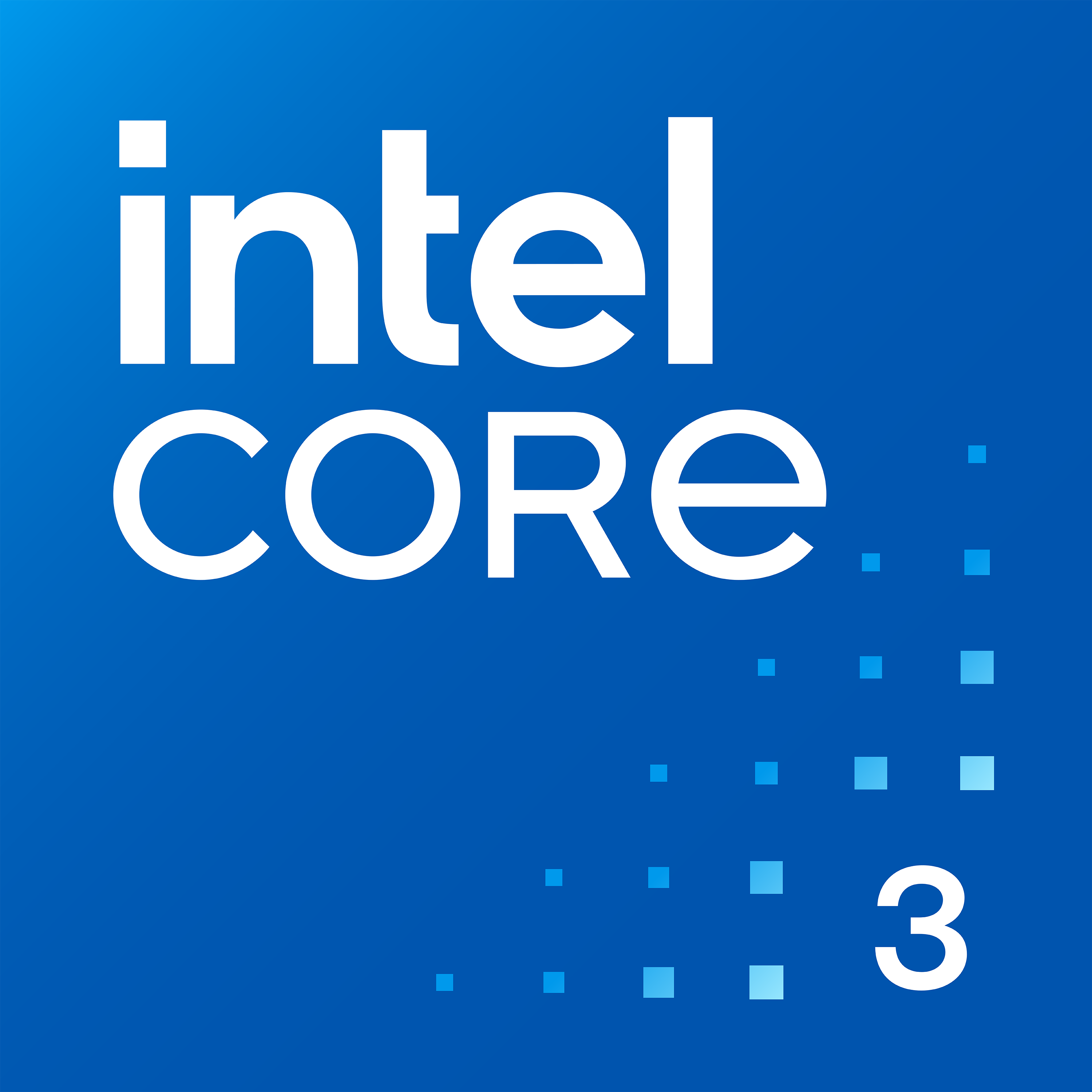
Intel Core 3 logo

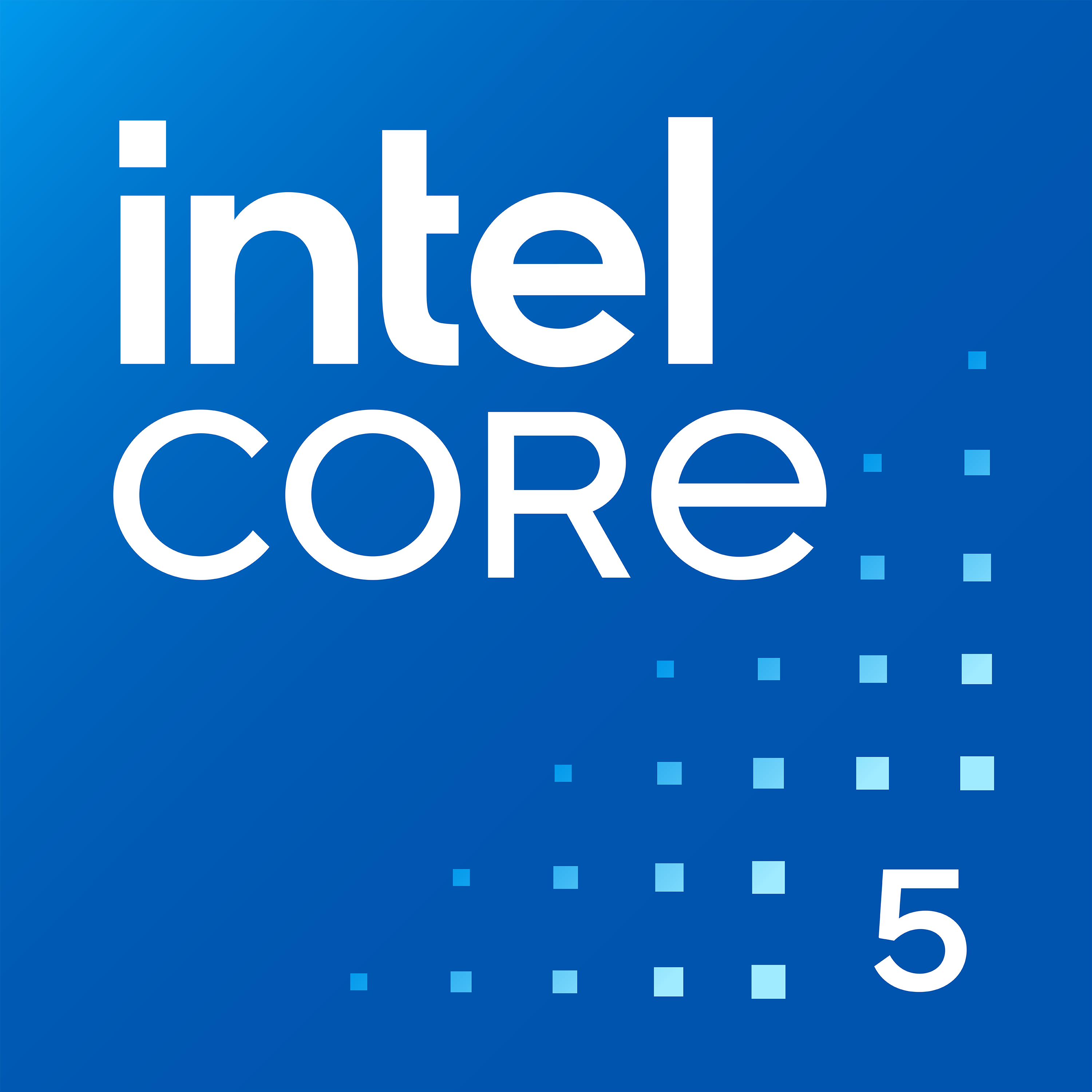
Intel Core 5 logo

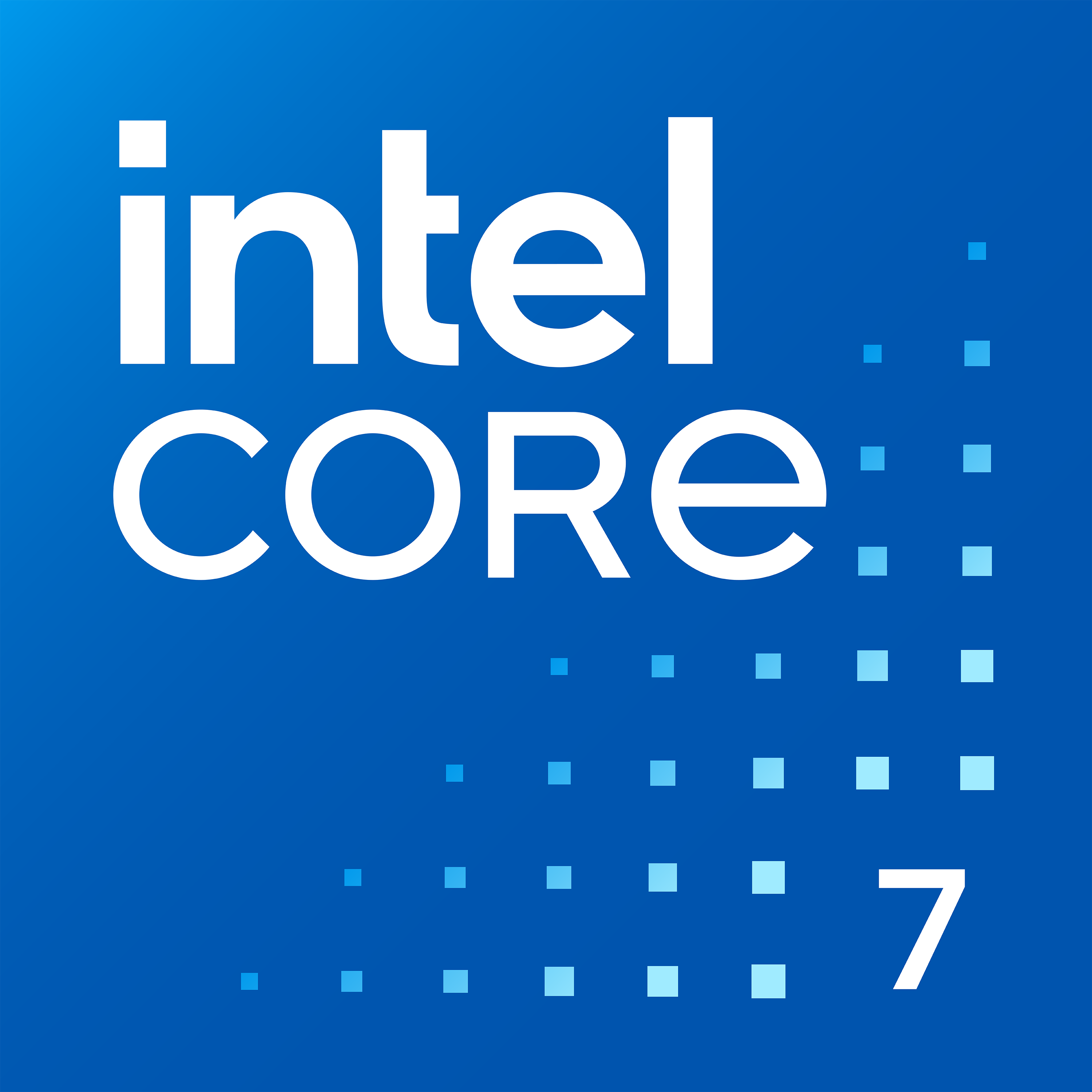
Intel Core 7 logo
The number of dots on each logo increases depending on how advanced the sub-brand is.
Intel Core Ultra sub-brand logos, from 2023 to present (officially released with Meteor Lake in late 2023)
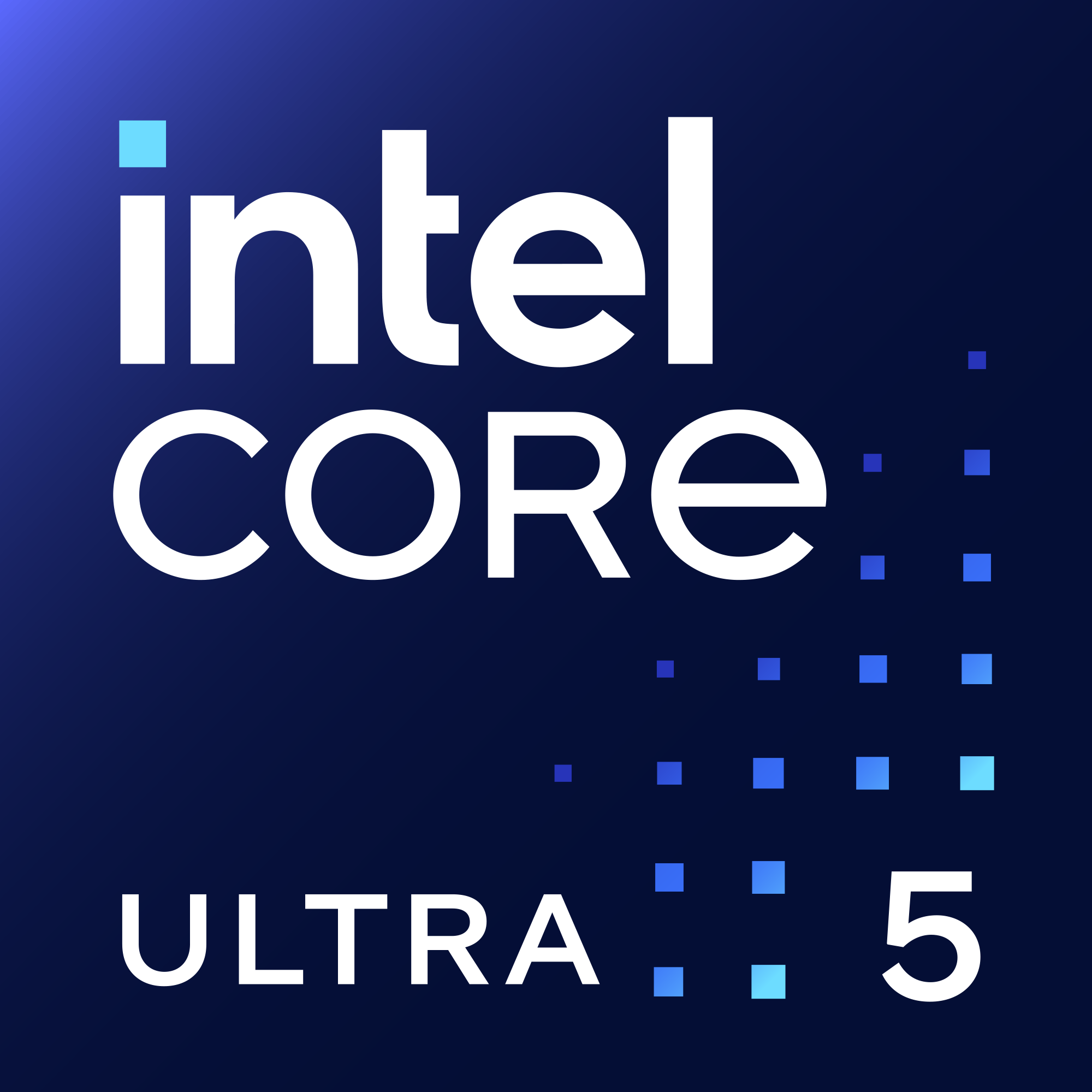
Intel Core Ultra 5 logo

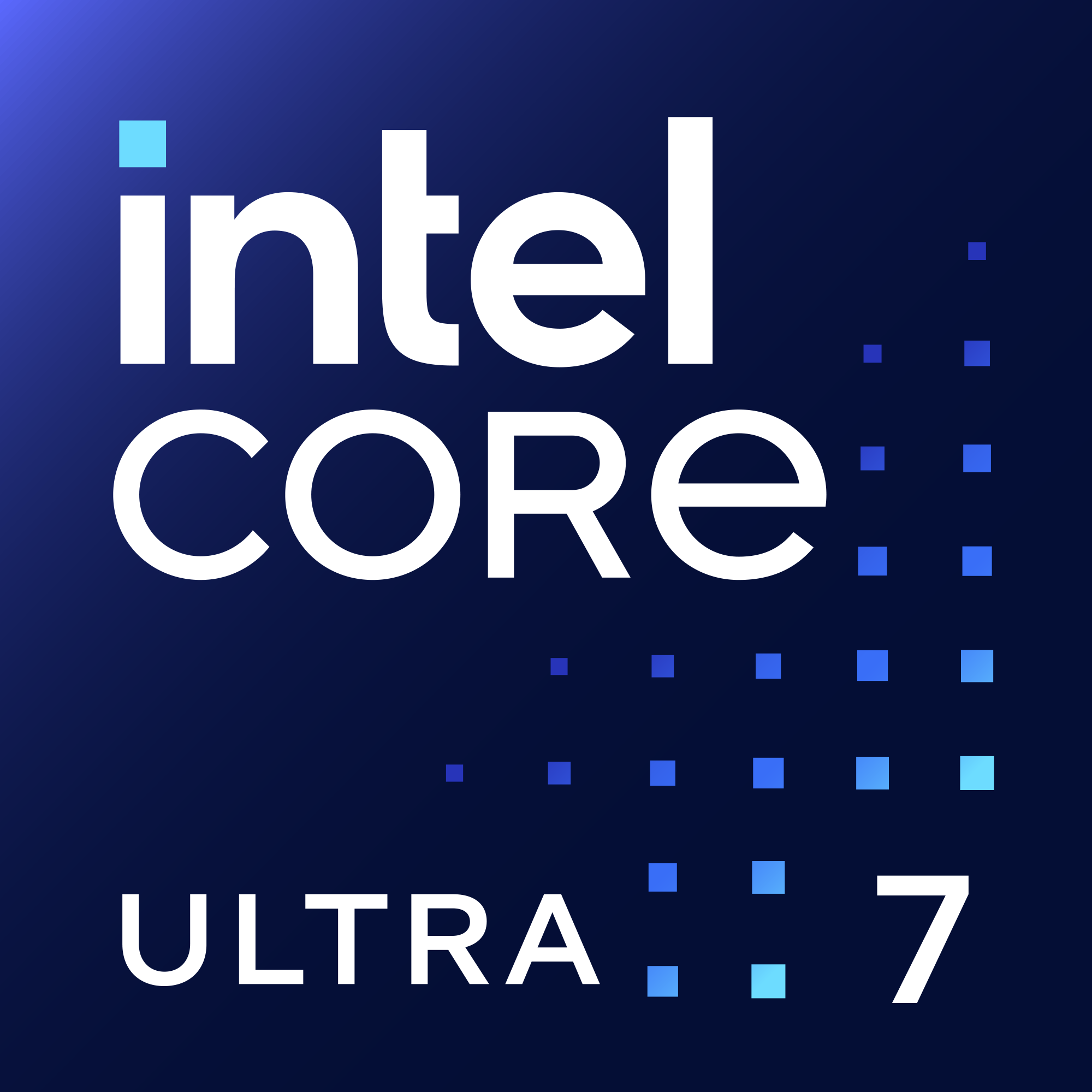
Intel Core Ultra 7 logo

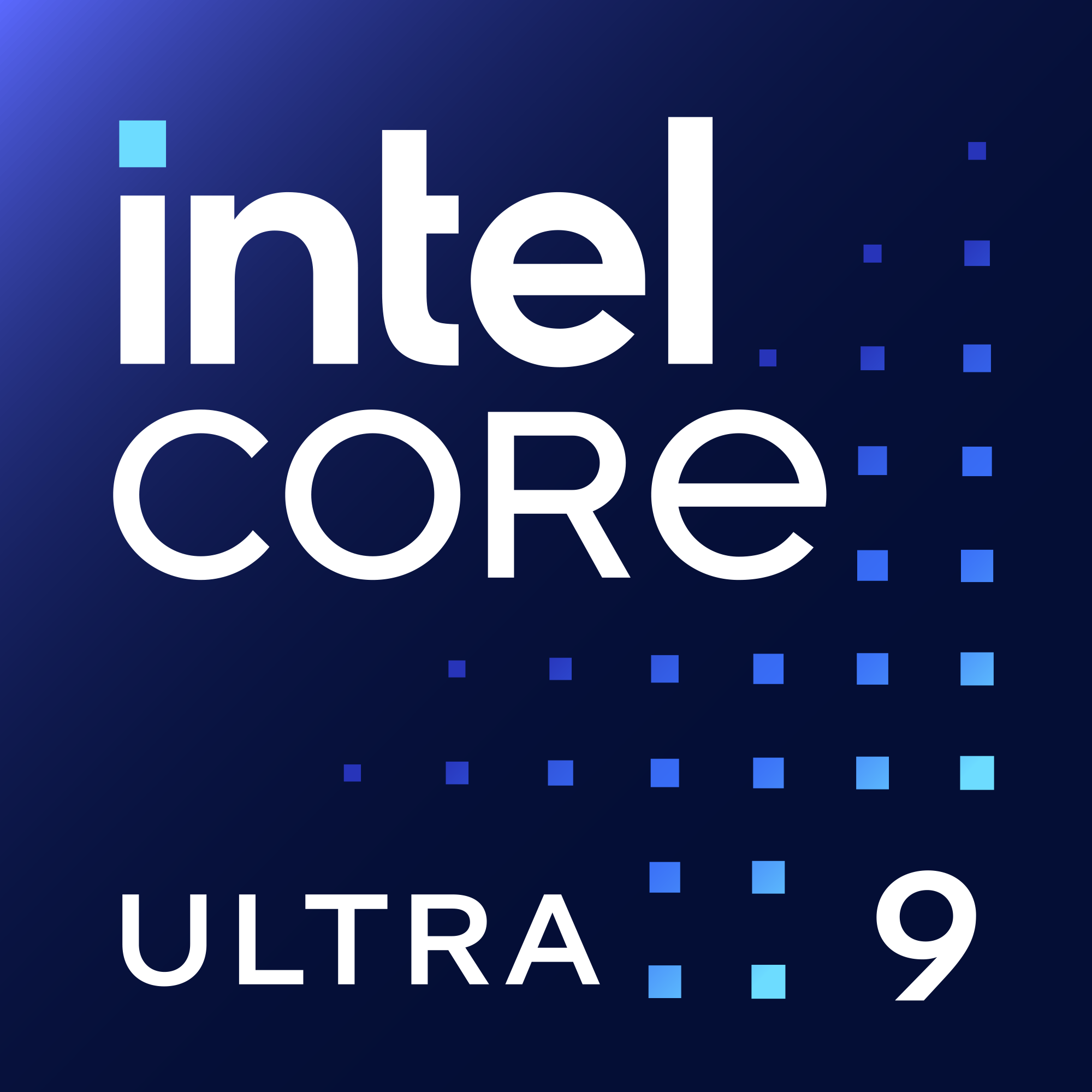
Intel Core Ultra 9 logo
The number of dots on each logo increases depending on how advanced the sub-brand is.
The shade of blue in every logo is darker than the standard "Intel Core" sub-brand logos.

== Core series ==
=== Core ===
The original Core brand refers to Intel's 32-bit mobile dual-core x86 CPUs, which were derived from the Pentium M branded processors. The processor family used an enhanced version of the P6 microarchitecture. It emerged in parallel with the NetBurst microarchitecture (Intel P68) of the Pentium 4 brand, and was a precursor of the 64-bit Core microarchitecture of Core 2 branded CPUs. The Core brand had two branches: the Duo (dual-core) and Solo (single-core, which replaced the Pentium M brand of single-core mobile processor).

Intel launched the Core brand on January 6, 2006, with the release of the 32-bit Yonah CPU – Intel's first dual-core mobile (low-power) processor. Its dual-core layout closely resembled two interconnected Pentium M branded CPUs packaged as a single die (piece) silicon chip (IC). Hence, the 32-bit microarchitecture of Core branded CPUs – contrary to its name – had more in common with Pentium M branded CPUs than with the subsequent 64-bit Core microarchitecture of Core 2 branded CPUs. Despite a major rebranding effort by Intel starting January 2006, some companies continued to market computers with the Yonah core marked as Pentium M.

The Core series is also the first Intel processor used in an Apple Macintosh computer. The Core Duo was the CPU for the first generation MacBook Pro, while the Core Solo appeared in Apple's Mac Mini line. Core Duo signified the beginning of Apple's shift to Intel processors across the entire Mac line.

In 2007, Intel began branding the Yonah CPUs intended for mainstream mobile computers as Pentium Dual-Core, not to be confused with the desktop 64-bit Core microarchitecture CPUs also branded as Pentium Dual-Core.

September 2007 and January 4, 2008 marked the discontinuation of a number of Core branded CPUs including several Core Solo, Core Duo, Celeron and one Core 2 Quad products.

=== Core Solo ===
Intel Core Solo (product code 80538) uses the same two-core die as the Core Duo, but features only one active core. Depending on demand, Intel may also simply disable one of the cores to sell the chip at the Core Solo price—this requires less effort than launching and maintaining a separate line of CPUs that physically only have one core. Intel had used the same strategy previously with the 486 CPU in which early 486SX CPUs were in fact manufactured as 486DX CPUs but with the FPU disabled.

Codename	Brand name (list)	L2 Cache	Socket	TDP
Yonah	Core Solo T1xxx	2 MB	Socket M	27–31 W
Yonah	Core Solo U1xxx	2 MB	Socket M	5.5–6 W

=== Core Duo ===
Intel Core Duo (product code 80539) consists of two cores on one die, a 2 MB L2 cache shared by both cores, and an arbiter bus that controls both L2 cache and FSB (front-side bus) access.

Codename	Brand name (list)	L2 Cache	Socket	TDP
Yonah	Core Duo T2xxx	2 MB	Socket M	31 W
Yonah	Core Duo L2xxx	2 MB	Socket M	15 W
Yonah	Core Duo U2xxx	2 MB	Socket M	9 W

=== Core 2 ===
The successor to Core is the mobile version of the Core 2 line of processors based on the Core microarchitecture, released on July 27, 2006 and produced through July 30, 2011. The release of the mobile version of Intel Core 2 marks the reunification of Intel's desktop and mobile product lines as Core 2 processors were released for desktops and notebooks, unlike the first Intel Core CPUs that were targeted only for notebooks (although they were used in some small form factor and all-in-one desktops, like the iMac and the Mac Mini).

Unlike the original Core, Intel Core '2's are 64-bit processors, supporting Intel Extended Memory 64 Technology (EM64T), Intel's name at the time for AMD's 64-bit extensions of the x86 architecture. Another difference between the original Core Duo and the new Core 2 Duo is an increase in the amount of level 2 cache. The new Core 2 Duo has tripled the amount of on-board cache to 6 MB. Core 2 also introduced a quad-core performance variant to the single- and dual-core chips, branded Core 2 Quad, as well as an enthusiast variant, Core 2 Extreme. All three chips are manufactured at a 65 nm lithography, and in 2008, a 45 nm lithography and support front side bus speeds ranging from 533 MT/s to 1.6 GT/s. In addition, the 45 nm die shrink of the Core microarchitecture adds SSE4.1 support to all Core 2 microprocessors manufactured at a 45 nm lithography, therefore increasing the calculation rate of the processors.

=== Core 2 Solo ===
The Core 2 Solo, introduced in September 2007, is the successor to the Core Solo and is available only as an ultra-low-power mobile processor with 5.5 Watt thermal design power. The original U2xxx series "Merom-L" used a special version of the Merom chip with CPUID number 10661 (model 22, stepping A1) that only had a single core and was also used in some Celeron processors. The later SU3xxx are part of Intel's CULV range of processors in a smaller μFC-BGA 956 package but contain the same Penryn chip as the dual-core variants, with one of the cores disabled during manufacturing.

Codename	Brand name (list)	L2 cache	Socket	TDP
Merom-L	Mobile Core 2 Solo U2xxx	1 MB	FCBGA	5.5 W
Penryn-L	Mobile Core 2 Solo SU3xxx	3 MB	BGA956	5.5 W

=== Core 2 Duo ===
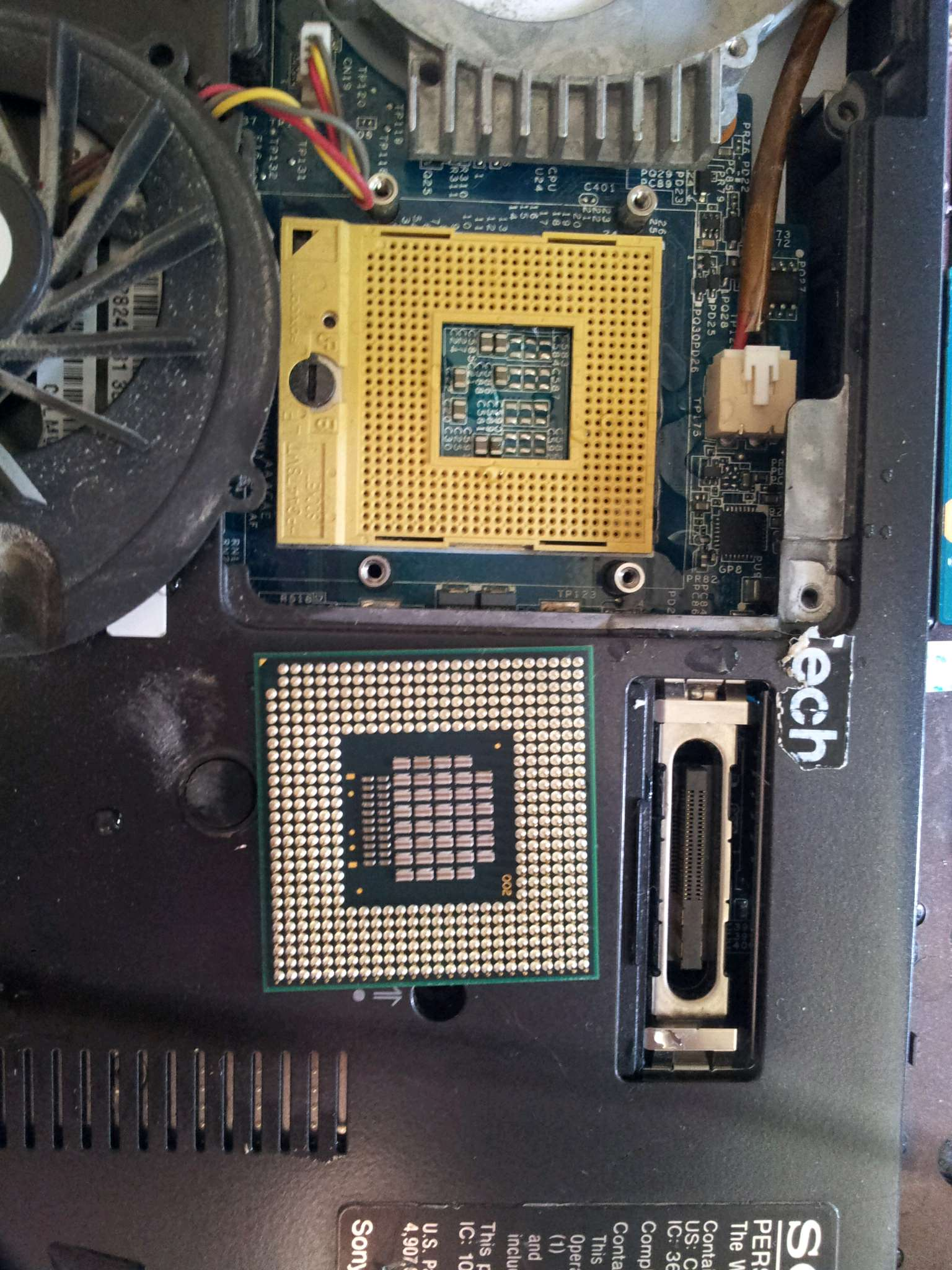
Inside of a Sony VAIO laptop (VGN-C140G)

The majority of the desktop and mobile Core 2 processor variants are Core 2 Duo with two processor cores on a single Merom, Conroe, Allendale, Penryn, or Wolfdale chip. These come in a wide range of performance and power consumption, starting with the relatively slow ultra-low-power Uxxxx (10 W) and low-power Lxxxx (17 W) versions, to the more performance oriented Pxxxx (25 W) and Txxxx (35 W) mobile versions and the Exxxx (65 W) desktop models. The mobile Core 2 Duo processors with an 'S' prefix in the name are produced in a smaller μFC-BGA 956 package, which allows building more compact laptops.

Within each line, a higher number usually refers to a better performance, which depends largely on core and front-side bus clock frequency and amount of second level cache, which are model-specific. Core 2 Duo processors typically use the full L2 cache of 2, 3, 4, or 6 MB available in the specific stepping of the chip, while versions with the amount of cache reduced during manufacturing are sold for the low-end consumer market as Celeron or Pentium Dual-Core processors. Like those processors, some low-end Core 2 Duo models disable features such as Intel Virtualization Technology.

Codename	Brand name (list)	L2 cache	Socket	TDP
Merom	Mobile Core 2 Duo U7xxx	2 MB	BGA479	10 W
Merom	Mobile Core 2 Duo L7xxx	4 MB	BGA479	17 W
Merom	Mobile Core 2 Duo T5xxx	2 MB	Socket M Socket P BGA479	35 W
Merom	Mobile Core 2 Duo T7xxx	2–4 MB	Socket M Socket P BGA479	35 W
Conroe and Allendale	Core 2 Duo E4xxx	2 MB	LGA 775	65 W
Conroe and Allendale	Core 2 Duo E6xxx	2–4 MB	LGA 775	65 W
Penryn	Mobile Core 2 Duo SU7xxx	3 MB	BGA956	10 W
Penryn	Mobile Core 2 Duo SU9xxx	3 MB	BGA956	10 W
Penryn	Mobile Core 2 Duo SL9xxx	6 MB	BGA956	17 W
Penryn	Mobile Core 2 Duo SP9xxx	6 MB	BGA956	25 W
Penryn	Mobile Core 2 Duo P7xxx	3 MB	Socket P FCBGA6	25 W
Penryn	Mobile Core 2 Duo P8xxx	3 MB	Socket P FCBGA6	25 W
Penryn	Mobile Core 2 Duo P9xxx	6 MB	Socket P FCBGA6	25 W
Penryn	Mobile Core 2 Duo T6xxx	2 MB	Socket P FCBGA6	35 W
Penryn	Mobile Core 2 Duo T8xxx	3 MB	Socket P FCBGA6	35 W
Penryn	Mobile Core 2 Duo T9xxx	6 MB	Socket P FCBGA6	35 W
Penryn	Mobile Core 2 Duo E8xxx	6 MB	Socket P	35–55 W
Wolfdale	Core 2 Duo E7xxx	3 MB	LGA 775	65 W
Wolfdale	Core 2 Duo E8xxx	6 MB	LGA 775	65 W

=== Core 2 Quad ===
Core 2 Quad processors are multi-chip modules consisting of two dies similar to those used in Core 2 Duo, forming a quad-core processor. This allows twice the performance of a dual-core processors at the same clock frequency in scenarios that take advantage of multi-threading.

Initially, all Core 2 Quad models were versions of Core 2 Duo desktop processors, Kentsfield derived from Conroe and Yorkfield from Wolfdale, but later Penryn-QC was added as a high-end version of the mobile dual-core Penryn.

The Xeon 32xx and 33xx processors are mostly identical versions of the desktop Core 2 Quad processors and can be used interchangeably.

Codename	Brand name (list)	L2 cache	Socket	TDP
Kentsfield	Core 2 Quad Q6xxx	2×4 MB	LGA 775	95–105 W
Yorkfield	Core 2 Quad Q8xxx	2×2 MB	LGA 775	65–95 W
Yorkfield	Core 2 Quad Q9xxx	2×3–2×6 MB	LGA 775	65–95 W
Penryn-QC	Mobile Core 2 Quad Q9xxx	2×3–2×6 MB	Socket P	45 W

=== Core 2 Extreme ===
Core 2 Extreme processors are enthusiast versions of Core 2 Duo and Core 2 Quad processors, usually with a higher clock frequency and an unlocked clock multiplier, which makes them especially attractive for overclocking. This is similar to earlier Pentium D processors labeled as Extreme Edition. Core 2 Extreme processors were released at a much higher price than their regular version, often $999 or more.

Codename	Brand name (list)	L2 cache	Socket	TDP
Merom XE	Mobile Core 2 Extreme X7xxx	4 MB	Socket P	44 W
Conroe XE	Core 2 Extreme X6xxx	4 MB	LGA 775	75 W
Kentsfield	Core 2 Extreme QX6xxx	2×4 MB	LGA 775	130 W
Penryn XE	Mobile Core 2 Extreme X9xxx	6 MB	Socket P	44 W
Penryn-QC XE	Mobile Core 2 Extreme QX9300	2×6 MB	Socket P	45 W
Yorkfield	Core 2 Extreme QX9xxx	2×6 MB	LGA 775 / LGA 771	130–150 W

== Core i3/i5/i7/i9 series (before Dec 2023) ==
Intel introduced a new tier-based naming scheme for its Core processors with the launch of the Nehalem microarchitecture in November 2008. Unlike earlier branding, these names no longer reflected specific technical features such as core count, but instead indicated relative performance levels: entry-level (i3), mid-range (i5), and high-end (i7). The tiers corresponded to the company's prior Intel Processor Rating system, which assigned three, four, and five stars to the Core lines, above the one- and two-star ratings for Celeron and Pentium, respectively. In 2017, Intel added a fourth tier with the introduction of the Core i9, positioned above the i7 as a premium high-performance option.

Pre-i9 series Era

=== 1st generation ===
The Nehalem microarchitecture was introduced in November 2008. Common features of all Nehalem based processors include an integrated DDR3 memory controller as well as QuickPath Interconnect or PCI Express and Direct Media Interface on the processor replacing the aging quad-pumped Front Side Bus used in all earlier Core processors. All these processors have 256 KB L2 cache per core, plus up to 12 MB shared L3 cache. Because of the new I/O interconnect, chipsets and mainboards from previous generations can no longer be used with Nehalem-based processors.

Intel intended the Core i3 as the new low end of the performance processor line from Intel, following the retirement of the Core 2 brand.

The first Core i3 processors were launched on January 7, 2010.

The first Nehalem based Core i3 was Clarkdale-based, with an integrated GPU and two cores. The same processor is also available as Core i5 and Pentium, with slightly different configurations.

The Core i3-3xxM processors are based on Arrandale, the mobile version of the Clarkdale desktop processor. They are similar to the Core i5-4xx series but running at lower clock speeds and without Turbo Boost. According to an Intel FAQ they do not support Error Correction Code (ECC) memory. According to motherboard manufacturer Supermicro, if a Core i3 processor is used with a server chipset platform such as Intel 3400/3420/3450, the CPU supports ECC with UDIMM. According to a forum post, when asked, Intel confirmed that, although the Intel 5 series chipset supports non-ECC memory only with the Core i5 or i3 processors, using those processors on a motherboard with 3400 series chipsets it supports the ECC function of ECC memory. A limited number of motherboards by other companies also support ECC with Intel Core ix processors; the Asus P8B WS is an example, but it does not support ECC memory under Windows non-server operating systems.

Codename	Brand name (list)	Cores	L3 Cache	Socket	TDP	I/O Bus
Clarkdale	Core i3	2	4 MB	LGA 1156	73 W	Direct Media Interface, Integrated GPU
Arrandale	Core i3-3xxM	2	3 MB	rPGA-988A	35 W	Direct Media Interface, Integrated GPU
Arrandale	Core i3-3xxUM	2	3 MB	BGA-1288	18 W	

Lynnfield were the first Core i5 processors using the Nehalem microarchitecture, introduced on September 8, 2009, as a mainstream variant of the earlier Core i7. Lynnfield Core i5 processors have an 8 MB L3 cache, a DMI bus running at 2.5 GT/s and support for dual-channel DDR3-800/1066/1333 memory and have Hyper-threading disabled. The same processors with different sets of features (Hyper-threading and other clock frequencies) enabled are sold as Core i7-8xx and Xeon 3400-series processors, which should not be confused with high-end Core i7-9xx and Xeon 3500-series processors based on Bloomfield. A new feature called Turbo Boost Technology was introduced which maximizes speed for demanding applications, dynamically accelerating performance to match the workload.

After Nehalem received a 32 nm Westmere die shrink, Arrandale, the dual-core mobile Core i5 processors and its desktop counterpart Clarkdale was introduced in January 2010, together with Core i7-6xx and Core i3-3xx processors based on the same architecture. Arrandale processors have integrated graphics capability. Core i3-3xx does not support for Turbo Boost, L3 cache in Core i5-5xx processors is reduced to 3 MB, while the Core i5-6xx uses the full cache, Clarkdale is sold as Core i5-6xx, along with related Core i3 and Pentium processors. It has Hyper-Threading enabled and the full 4 MB L3 cache.

According to Intel "Core i5 desktop processors and desktop boards typically do not support ECC memory", but information on limited ECC support in the Core i3 section also applies to Core i5 and i7.

Codename	Brand name (list)	Cores	L3 Cache	Socket	TDP	I/O Bus
Lynnfield	Core i5-7xx	4	8 MB	LGA 1156	95 W	Direct Media Interface
Lynnfield	Core i5-7xxS	4	8 MB	LGA 1156	82 W	Direct Media Interface
Clarkdale	Core i5-6xx	2	4 MB	LGA 1156	73–87 W	Direct Media Interface, Integrated GPU
Arrandale	Core i5-5xxM	2	3 MB	rPGA-988A	35 W	Direct Media Interface, Integrated GPU
Arrandale	Core i5-4xxM	2	3 MB	rPGA-988A	35 W	Direct Media Interface, Integrated GPU
Arrandale	Core i5-5xxUM	2	3 MB	BGA-1288	18 W	Direct Media Interface, Integrated GPU
Arrandale	Core i5-4xxUM	2	3 MB	BGA-1288	18 W	Direct Media Interface, Integrated GPU

The Core i7 brand targets the business and high-end consumer markets for both desktop and laptop computers, and is distinguished from the Core i3 (entry-level consumer), Core i5 (mainstream consumer), and Xeon (server and workstation) brands.

Introduced in late 2008, Bloomfield was the first Core i7 processors based on the Nehalem architecture. The following year, Lynnfield desktop processors and Clarksfield mobile processors brought new quad-core Core i7 models based on the said architecture.

After Nehalem received a 32 nm Westmere die shrink, Arrandale dual-core mobile processors were introduced in January 2010, followed by Core i7's first six-core desktop processor Gulftown on March 16, 2010. Both the regular Core i7 and the Extreme Edition are advertised as five stars in the Intel Processor Rating.

The first-generation Core i7 uses two different sockets; LGA 1366 designed for high-end desktops and servers, and LGA 1156 used in low- and mid-end desktops and servers. In each generation, the highest-performing Core i7 processors use the same socket and QPI-based architecture as the medium-end Xeon processors of that generation, while lower-performing Core i7 processors use the same socket and PCIe/DMI/FDI architecture as the Core i5.

"Core i7" is a successor to the Intel Core 2 brand. Intel representatives stated that they intended the moniker Core i7 to help consumers decide which processor to purchase as Intel releases newer Nehalem-based products in the future.

Code name	Brand name	Cores	L3 Cache	Socket	TDP	Process	Busses	Release Date
Gulftown	Core i7-9xxX Extreme Edition	6	12 MB	LGA 1366	130 W	32 nm	QPI, 3 × DDR3	Mar 2010
Gulftown	Core i7-970	6	12 MB	LGA 1366	130 W	32 nm	QPI, 3 × DDR3	Jul 2010
Bloomfield	Core i7-9xx Extreme Edition	4	8 MB	LGA 1366	130 W	45 nm	QPI, 3 × DDR3	Nov 2008
Bloomfield	Core i7-9xx (except Core i7-970/980)	4	8 MB	LGA 1366	130 W	45 nm	QPI, 3 × DDR3	Nov 2008
Lynnfield	Core i7-8xx	4	8 MB	LGA 1156	95 W	45 nm	DMI, PCI-e, 2 × DDR3	Sep 2009
Lynnfield	Core i7-8xxS	4	8 MB	LGA 1156	82 W	45 nm	DMI, PCI-e, 2 × DDR3	Jan 2010
Clarksfield	Core i7-9xxXM Extreme Edition	4	8 MB	rPGA-988A	55 W	45 nm	DMI, PCI-e, 2 × DDR3	Sep 2009
Clarksfield	Core i7-8xxQM	4	8 MB	rPGA-988A	45 W	45 nm	DMI, PCI-e, 2 × DDR3	Sep 2009
Clarksfield	Core i7-7xxQM	4	6 MB	rPGA-988A	45 W	45 nm	DMI, PCI-e, 2 × DDR3	Sep 2009
Arrandale	Core i7-6xxM	2	4 MB	rPGA-988A	35 W	32 nm	DMI, PCI-e, FDI, 2 × DDR3	Jan 2010
Arrandale	Core i7-6xxLM	2	4 MB	BGA-1288	25 W	32 nm	DMI, PCI-e, FDI, 2 × DDR3	Jan 2010
Arrandale	Core i7-6xxUM	2	4 MB	BGA-1288	18 W	32 nm	DMI, PCI-e, FDI, 2 × DDR3	Jan 2010

=== 2nd generation ===
In early 2011, Intel introduced a new microarchitecture named Sandy Bridge. This is the second generation of the Core processor microarchitecture. It kept all the existing brands from Nehalem, including Core i3/i5/i7, and introduced new model numbers. The initial set of Sandy Bridge processors includes dual- and quad-core variants, all of which use a single 32 nm die for both the CPU and integrated GPU cores, unlike the earlier microarchitectures. All Core i3/i5/i7 processors with the Sandy Bridge microarchitecture have a four-digit model number. With the mobile version, the thermal design power can no longer be determined from a one- or two-letter suffix but is encoded into the CPU number. Starting with Sandy Bridge, Intel no longer distinguishes the code names of the processor based on number of cores, socket or intended usage; they all use the same code name as the microarchitecture itself.

Ivy Bridge is the codename for Intel's 22 nm die shrink of the Sandy Bridge microarchitecture based on tri-gate ("3D") transistors, introduced in April 2012.

Released on January 20, 2011, the Core i3-2xxx line of desktop and mobile processors is a direct replacement of the 2010 "Clarkdale" Core i3-5xx and "Arrandale" Core i3-3xxM models, based on the new microarchitecture. While they require new sockets and chipsets, the user-visible features of the Core i3 are largely unchanged, including the lack of support for Turbo Boost and AES-NI. Unlike the Sandy Bridge-based Celeron and Pentium processors, the Core i3 line does support the new Advanced Vector Extensions. This particular processor is the entry-level processor of this new series of Intel processors.

Codename	Brand name (list)	Cores	L3 cache	Socket	TDP	I/O Bus
Sandy Bridge (Desktop)	Core i3-21xx	2	3 MB	LGA 1155	65 W	Direct Media Interface, Integrated GPU
Sandy Bridge (Desktop)	Core i3-21xxT	2	3 MB	LGA 1155	35 W	Direct Media Interface, Integrated GPU
Sandy Bridge (Mobile)	Core i3-2xx0M	2	3 MB	rPGA-988B; BGA-1023	35 W	Direct Media Interface, Integrated GPU
Sandy Bridge (Mobile)	Core i3-2xx7M	2	3 MB	BGA-1023	17 W	Direct Media Interface, Integrated GPU

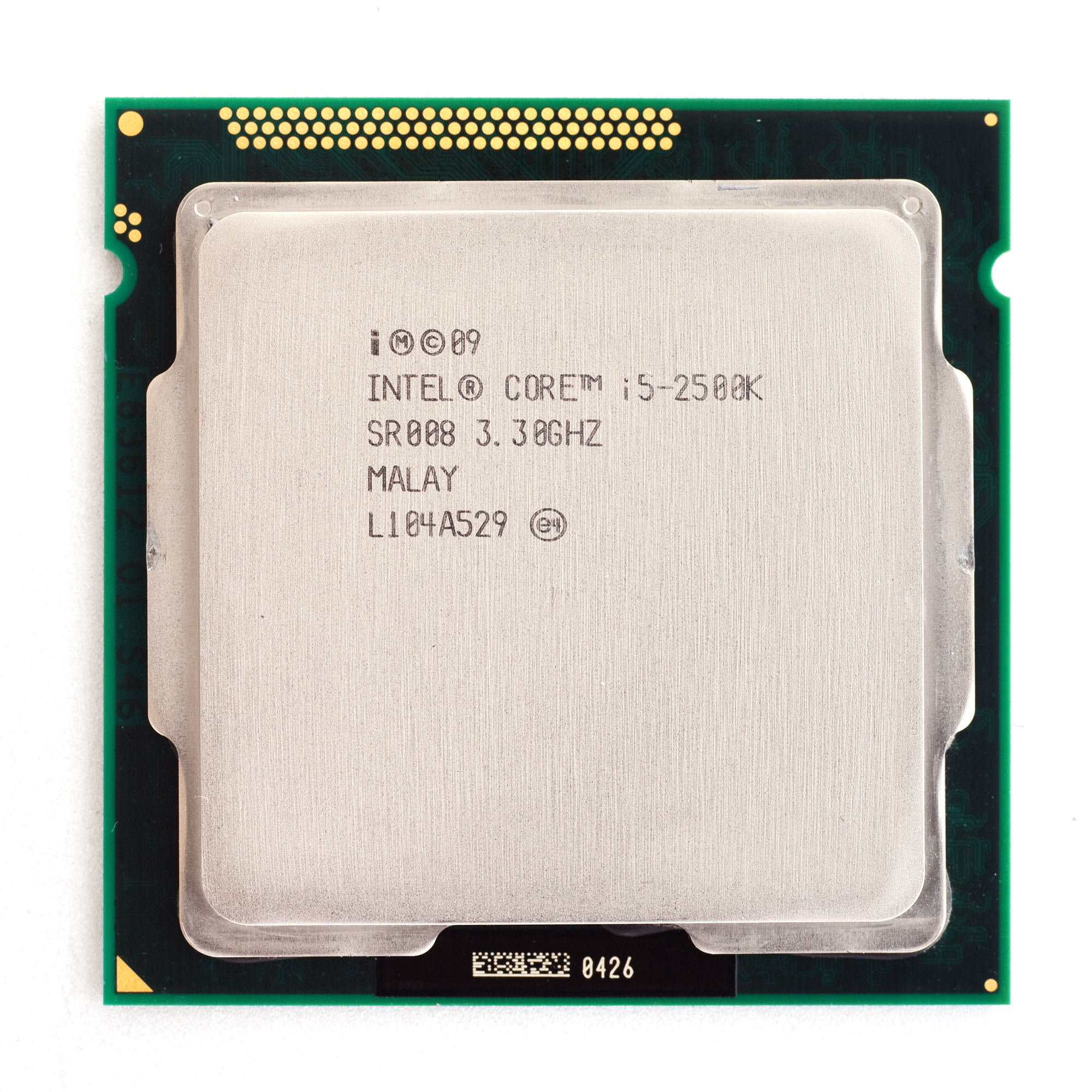
A Core i5-2500K. The K suffix indicates an unlocked clock multiplier, which allows for easier overclocking.

In January 2011, Intel released new quad-core Core i5 processors based on the "Sandy Bridge" microarchitecture at CES 2011. New dual-core mobile processors and desktop processors arrived in February 2011.

The Core i5-2xxx line of desktop processors are mostly quad-core chips, with the exception of the dual-core Core i5-2390T, and include integrated graphics, combining the key features of the earlier Core i5-6xx and Core i5-7xx lines. The suffix after the four-digit model number designates unlocked multiplier (K), low-power (S) and ultra-low-power (T).

The desktop CPUs now all have four non-SMT cores (like the i5-750), with the exception of the i5-2390T. The DMI bus runs at 5 GT/s.

The mobile Core i5-2xxxM processors are all dual-core and hyper-threaded chips like the previous Core i5-5xxM series, and share most of the features with that product line.

Codename	Brand name (list)	Cores	L3 cache	Socket	TDP	I/O Bus
Sandy Bridge (Desktop)	Core i5-2xxx Core i5-2xxxK	4	6 MB	LGA 1155	95 W	Direct Media Interface, Integrated GPU
Sandy Bridge (Desktop)	Core i5-2xxxS	4	6 MB	LGA 1155	65 W	Direct Media Interface, Integrated GPU
Sandy Bridge (Desktop)	Core i5-25xxT	4	6 MB	LGA 1155	45 W	Direct Media Interface, Integrated GPU
Sandy Bridge (Desktop)	Core i5-23xxT	2	3 MB	LGA 1155	35 W	Direct Media Interface, Integrated GPU
Sandy Bridge (Mobile)	Core i5-2xxxM	2	3 MB	rPGA-988B; BGA-1023	35 W	Direct Media Interface, Integrated GPU
Sandy Bridge (Mobile)	Core i5-2xx7M	2	3 MB	BGA-1023	17 W	Direct Media Interface, Integrated GPU

The Core i7 brand was the high-end for Intel's desktop and mobile processors, until the announcement of the i9 in 2017. Its Sandy Bridge models feature the largest amount of L3 cache and the highest clock frequency. Most of these models are very similar to their smaller Core i5 siblings. The quad-core mobile Core i7-2xxxQM/XM processors follow the previous "Clarksfield" Core i7-xxxQM/XM processors, but now also include integrated graphics.

Codename	Brand name (list)	Cores	L3 cache	Socket	TDP	Process	I/O Bus	Release Date
Sandy Bridge-E (Desktop)	Core i7-39xxX	6	15 MB	LGA 2011	130 W	32 nm	Direct Media Interface	November 2011
Sandy Bridge-E (Desktop)	Core i7-39xxK	6	12 MB	LGA 2011	130 W	32 nm	Direct Media Interface	November 2011
Sandy Bridge-E (Desktop)	Core i7-38xx	4	10 MB	LGA 2011	130 W	32 nm	Direct Media Interface	November 2011
Sandy Bridge (Desktop)	Core i7-2xxxK, i7-2xxx	4	8 MB	LGA 1155	95 W	32 nm	Direct Media Interface, Integrated GPU	January 2011
Sandy Bridge (Desktop)	Core i7-2xxxS	4	8 MB	LGA 1155	65 W	32 nm	Direct Media Interface, Integrated GPU	January 2011
Sandy Bridge (Mobile)	Core i7-2xxxXM	4	8 MB	rPGA-988B; BGA-1023	55 W	32 nm	Direct Media Interface, Integrated GPU	January 2011
Sandy Bridge (Mobile)	Core i7-28xxQM	4	8 MB	rPGA-988B; BGA-1023	45 W	32 nm	Direct Media Interface, Integrated GPU	January 2011
Sandy Bridge (Mobile)	Core i7-2xxxQE, i7-26xxQM, i7-27xxQM	4	6 MB	rPGA-988B; BGA-1023	45 W	32 nm	Direct Media Interface, Integrated GPU	January 2011
Sandy Bridge (Mobile)	Core i7-2xx0M	2	4 MB	rPGA-988B; BGA-1023	35 W	32 nm	Direct Media Interface, Integrated GPU	February 2011
Sandy Bridge (Mobile)	Core i7-2xx9M	2	4 MB	BGA-1023	25 W	32 nm	Direct Media Interface, Integrated GPU	February 2011
Sandy Bridge (Mobile)	Core i7-2xx7M	2	4 MB	BGA-1023	17 W	32 nm	Direct Media Interface, Integrated GPU	February 2011

=== 3rd generation ===
Ivy Bridge is the codename for a "third generation" line of processors based on the 22 nm manufacturing process developed by Intel. Mobile versions of the CPU were released in April 2012 following with desktop versions in September 2012.

The Ivy Bridge-based Core-i3-3xxx line is a minor upgrade to 22 nm process technology and better graphics.

Codename	Brand name (list)	Cores	L3 Cache	Socket	TDP	I/O Bus
Ivy Bridge (Desktop)	Core i3-32xx	2	3 MB	LGA 1155	55 W	Direct Media Interface, Integrated GPU
Ivy Bridge (Desktop)	Core i3-32xxT	2	3 MB	LGA 1155	35 W	Direct Media Interface, Integrated GPU
Ivy Bridge (Mobile)	Core i3-3xx0M	2	3 MB	rPGA-988B; BGA-1023	35 W	Direct Media Interface, Integrated GPU
Ivy Bridge (Mobile)	Core i3-3xx7U	2	3 MB	BGA-1023	17 W	Direct Media Interface, Integrated GPU
Ivy Bridge (Mobile)	Core i3-3xx9Y	2	3 MB	BGA-1023	13 W	Direct Media Interface, Integrated GPU

Codename	Brand name (list)	Cores	L3 Cache	Socket	TDP	I/O Bus
Ivy Bridge (Desktop)	Core i5-3xxx Core i5-3xxxK	4	6 MB	LGA 1155	77 W	Direct Media Interface, Integrated GPU
Ivy Bridge (Desktop)	Core i5-3xxxS	4	6 MB	LGA 1155	65 W	Direct Media Interface, Integrated GPU
Ivy Bridge (Desktop)	Core i5-35xxT	4	6 MB	LGA 1155	45 W	Direct Media Interface, Integrated GPU
Ivy Bridge (Desktop)	Core i5-34xxT	2	3 MB	LGA 1155	35 W	Direct Media Interface, Integrated GPU
Ivy Bridge (Mobile)	Core i5-3xx0M	2	3 MB	rPGA-988B; BGA-1023	35 W	Direct Media Interface, Integrated GPU
Ivy Bridge (Mobile)	Core i5-3xx7U	2	3 MB	BGA-1023	17 W	Direct Media Interface, Integrated GPU
Ivy Bridge (Mobile)	Core i5-3xx9Y	2	3 MB	BGA-1023	13 W	Direct Media Interface, Integrated GPU

Codename	Brand name (list)	Cores	L3 cache	Socket	TDP	Process	I/O Bus	Release Date
Ivy Bridge-E (Desktop)	Core i7-4960X	6	15 MB	LGA 2011	130 W	22 nm	Direct Media Interface	September 2013
Ivy Bridge-E (Desktop)	Core i7-4930K	6	12 MB	LGA 2011	130 W	22 nm	Direct Media Interface	September 2013
Ivy Bridge-E (Desktop)	Core i7-4820K	4	10 MB	LGA 2011	130 W	22 nm	Direct Media Interface	September 2013
Ivy Bridge (Desktop)	Core i7-37xx, i7-37xxK	4	8 MB	LGA 1155	77 W	22 nm	Direct Media Interface, Integrated GPU	April 2012
Ivy Bridge (Desktop)	Core i7-37xxS	4	8 MB	LGA 1155	65 W	22 nm	Direct Media Interface, Integrated GPU	April 2012
Ivy Bridge (Desktop)	Core i7-37xxT	4	8 MB	LGA 1155	45 W	22 nm	Direct Media Interface, Integrated GPU	April 2012
Ivy Bridge (Mobile)	Core i7-3xxxXM	4	8 MB	LGA 1155	55 W	22 nm	Direct Media Interface, Integrated GPU	April 2012
Ivy Bridge (Mobile)	Core i7-38xxQM	4	8 MB	LGA 1155	45 W	22 nm	Direct Media Interface, Integrated GPU	April 2012
Ivy Bridge (Mobile)	Core i7-36x0QM, i7-3xx0QE, i7-36x5QM, i7-3xx5QE, i7-37xxQM	4	6 MB	LGA 1155	45 W	22 nm	Direct Media Interface, Integrated GPU	April 2012
Ivy Bridge (Mobile)	Core i7-3xx2QM, i7-3xx2QE	4	6 MB	LGA 1155	35 W	22 nm	Direct Media Interface, Integrated GPU	April 2012
Ivy Bridge (Mobile)	Core i7-3xxxM	2	4 MB	LGA 1155	35 W	22 nm	Direct Media Interface, Integrated GPU	April 2012
Ivy Bridge (Mobile)	Core i7-3xxxLE	2	4 MB	LGA 1155	25 W	22 nm	Direct Media Interface, Integrated GPU	April 2012
Ivy Bridge (Mobile)	Core i7-3xx7U, i7-3xx7UE	2	4 MB	LGA 1155	17 W	22 nm	Direct Media Interface, Integrated GPU	April 2012
Ivy Bridge (Mobile)	Core i7-3xx9Y	2	4 MB	LGA 1155	13 W	22 nm	Direct Media Interface, Integrated GPU	January 2013

=== 4th generation ===
Haswell is the fourth generation Core processor microarchitecture, and was released in 2013.

Codename	Brand name (list)	Cores	L3 cache	GPU Model	Socket	TDP	Process	I/O Bus	Release Date
Haswell-DT (Desktop)	Core i3-43xx	2	4 MB	HD 4600	LGA 1150	54 W	22 nm	Direct Media Interface, Integrated GPU	September 2013
Haswell-DT (Desktop)	Core i3-43xxT, Core i3-4xxxTE	2	4 MB	HD 4600	LGA 1150	35 W	22 nm	Direct Media Interface, Integrated GPU	September 2013
Haswell-DT (Desktop)	Core i3-41xx	2	3 MB	HD 4400	LGA 1150	54 W	22 nm	Direct Media Interface, Integrated GPU	September 2013
Haswell-DT (Desktop)	Core i3-41xxT	2	3 MB	HD 4400	LGA 1150	35 W	22 nm	Direct Media Interface, Integrated GPU	September 2013
Haswell-MB (Mobile)	Core i3-4xx2E	2	3 MB	HD 4600	BGA 1364	25 W	22 nm	Direct Media Interface, Integrated GPU	September 2013
Haswell-MB (Mobile)	Core i3-4xx0E	2	3 MB	HD 4600	BGA 1364	37 W	22 nm	Direct Media Interface, Integrated GPU	September 2013
Haswell-MB (Mobile)	Core i3-4xxxM	2	3 MB	HD 4600	Socket G3	37 W	22 nm	Direct Media Interface, Integrated GPU	September 2013
Haswell-MB (Mobile)	Core i3-4xx8U	2	3 MB	Iris 5100	BGA 1168	28 W	22 nm	Direct Media Interface, Integrated GPU	June 2013
Haswell-MB (Mobile)	Core i3-4xx0U, Core i3-4xx5U	2	3 MB	HD 4400	BGA 1168	15 W	22 nm	Direct Media Interface, Integrated GPU	June 2013
Haswell-MB (Mobile)	Core i3-4xxxY	2	3 MB	HD 4200	BGA 1168	11.5 W	22 nm	Direct Media Interface, Integrated GPU	June 2013

Codename	Brand name (list)	Cores	L3 cache	GPU Model	Socket	TDP	Process	I/O Bus	Release date
Haswell-DT (Desktop)	Core i5-4xxx, i5-46xxK	4	6 MB	HD 4600	LGA 1150	84 W	22 nm	Direct Media Interface, Integrated GPU	June 2013
Haswell-DT (Desktop)	Core i5-4xxxS	4	6 MB	HD 4600	LGA 1150	65 W	22 nm	Direct Media Interface, Integrated GPU	June 2013
Haswell-DT (Desktop)	Core i5-46xxT	4	6 MB	HD 4600	LGA 1150	45 W	22 nm	Direct Media Interface, Integrated GPU	June 2013
Haswell-DT (Desktop)	Core i5-45xxT, Core i5-45xxTE	2	4 MB	HD 4600	LGA 1150	35 W	22 nm	Direct Media Interface, Integrated GPU	June 2013
Haswell-DT (Desktop)	Core i5-45xxT, Core i5-45xxTE	2	4 MB	HD 4600	LGA 1150	65 W	22 nm	Direct Media Interface, Integrated GPU	June 2013
Haswell-H (MCP)	Core i5-4xxxR	4	4 MB	Iris Pro 5200	BGA 1364	65 W	22 nm	Direct Media Interface, Integrated GPU	June 2013
Haswell-MB (Mobile)	Core i5-4xxxH	2	3 MB	HD 4600	BGA 1364	47 W	22 nm	Direct Media Interface, Integrated GPU	September 2013
Haswell-MB (Mobile)	Core i5-4xx2E	2	3 MB	HD 4600	BGA 1364	25 W	22 nm	Direct Media Interface, Integrated GPU	September 2013
Haswell-MB (Mobile)	Core i5-4xx0E	2	3 MB	HD 4600	BGA 1364	37 W	22 nm	Direct Media Interface, Integrated GPU	September 2013
Haswell-MB (Mobile)	Core i5-4xxxM	2	3 MB	HD 4600	Socket G3	37 W	22 nm	Direct Media Interface, Integrated GPU	September 2013
Haswell-MB (Mobile)	Core i5-4xx8U	2	3 MB	Iris 5100	BGA1168	28 W	22 nm	Direct Media Interface, Integrated GPU	June 2013
Haswell-MB (Mobile)	Core i5-4x50U	2	3 MB	HD 5000	BGA1168	15 W	22 nm	Direct Media Interface, Integrated GPU	June 2013
Haswell-MB (Mobile)	Core i5-4x00U	2	3 MB	HD 4400	BGA1168	15 W	22 nm	Direct Media Interface, Integrated GPU	June 2013
Haswell-MB (Mobile)	Core i5-4xxxY	2	3 MB	HD 4200	BGA1168	11.5 W	22 nm	Direct Media Interface, Integrated GPU	June 2013

Codename	Brand name (list)	Cores	L3 cache	GPU Model	Socket	TDP	Process	I/O Bus	Release Date
Haswell-E (Desktop)	Core i7-5960X	8	20 MB	N/A	LGA 2011-3	140 W	22 nm	Direct Media Interface	September 2014
Haswell-E (Desktop)	Core i7-5930K	6	15 MB	N/A	LGA 2011-3	140 W	22 nm	Direct Media Interface	September 2014
Haswell-E (Desktop)	Core i7-5820K	6	15 MB	N/A	LGA 2011-3	140 W	22 nm	Direct Media Interface	September 2014
Haswell-DT (Desktop)	Core i7-47xx, i7-47xxK	4	8 MB	HD 4600	LGA 1150	84 W	22 nm	Direct Media Interface, Integrated GPU	June 2013
Haswell-DT (Desktop)	Core i7-47xxS	4	8 MB	HD 4600	LGA 1150	65 W	22 nm	Direct Media Interface, Integrated GPU	June 2013
Haswell-DT (Desktop)	Core i7-47x0T	4	8 MB	HD 4600	LGA 1150	45 W	22 nm	Direct Media Interface, Integrated GPU	June 2013
Haswell-DT (Desktop)	Core i7-47x5T	4	8 MB	HD 4600	LGA 1150	35 W	22 nm	Direct Media Interface, Integrated GPU	June 2013
Haswell-DT (Desktop)	Core i7-47xxR	4	6 MB	Iris Pro 5200	BGA 1364	65 W	22 nm	Direct Media Interface, Integrated GPU	June 2013
Haswell-MB (Mobile)	Core i7-4x50HQ, Core i7-4x60HQ; Core i7-4x50EQ, Core i7-4x60EQ	4	6 MB	Iris Pro 5200	BGA 1364	47 W	22 nm	Direct Media Interface, Integrated GPU	June 2013
Haswell-MB (Mobile)	Core i7-47x2HQ, Core i7-47x2EQ; Core i7-470xHQ, Core i7-470xEQ	4	6 MB	HD 4600	BGA 1364	37 W 47 W	22 nm	Direct Media Interface, Integrated GPU	June 2013
Haswell-MB (Mobile)	Core i7-47x2MQ; Core i7-470xMQ	4	6 MB	HD 4600	Socket G3	37 W 47 W	22 nm	Direct Media Interface, Integrated GPU	June 2013
Haswell-MB (Mobile)	Core i7-49xxMQ, Core i7-4xxxXM	4	8 MB	HD 4600	Socket G3	57 W	22 nm	Direct Media Interface, Integrated GPU	June 2013
Haswell-MB (Mobile)	Core i7-4xxxM	2	4 MB	HD 4600	Socket G3	35 W	22 nm	Direct Media Interface, Integrated GPU	September 2013
Haswell-MB (Mobile)	Core i7-4xx8U	2	4 MB	Iris 5100	BGA 1168	28 W	22 nm	Direct Media Interface, Integrated GPU	June 2013
Haswell-MB (Mobile)	Core i7-4x50U	2	4 MB	HD 5000	BGA 1168	15 W	22 nm	Direct Media Interface, Integrated GPU	June 2013
Haswell-MB (Mobile)	Core i7-4x00U	2	4 MB	HD 4400	BGA 1168	15 W	22 nm	Direct Media Interface, Integrated GPU	June 2013
Haswell-MB (Mobile)	Core i7-4xxxY	2	4 MB	HD 4200	BGA 1168	11.5 W	22 nm	Direct Media Interface, Integrated GPU	June 2013

=== 5th generation ===
Broadwell is the fifth generation Core processor microarchitecture, and was released by Intel on September 6, 2014, and began shipping in late 2014. It is the first to use a 14 nm chip. Additionally, mobile processors were launched in January 2015 and Desktop Core i5 and i7 processors were released in June 2015.

Desktop processor (DT-Series)

Processor branding	Model (list)	Cores (Threads)	L3 cache	GPU Model	Socket	TDP	Process	I/O Bus	Release Date
Core i7	5775C	4 (8)	6 MB	Iris 6200	LGA 1150	65 W	14 nm	Direct Media Interface, Integrated GPU	June 2015
Core i7	5775R	4 (8)	6 MB	Iris 6200	LGA 1150	65 W	14 nm	Direct Media Interface, Integrated GPU	June 2015
Core i5	5675C	4 (4)	4 MB	Iris 6200	LGA 1150	65 W	14 nm	Direct Media Interface, Integrated GPU	June 2015
Core i5	5675R	4 (4)	4 MB	Iris 6200	LGA 1150	65 W	14 nm	Direct Media Interface, Integrated GPU	June 2015
Core i5	5575R	4 (4)	4 MB	Iris 6200	LGA 1150	65 W	14 nm	Direct Media Interface, Integrated GPU	June 2015

Mobile processors (U-Series)

Processor branding	Model (list)	Cores (Threads)	L3 cache	GPU Model	Socket	TDP	Process	I/O Bus	Release Date
Core i7	5xx7U	2 (4)	4 MB	Iris 6100	BGA 1168	28 W	14 nm	Direct Media Interface, Integrated GPU	January 2015
Core i7	5x50U	2 (4)	4 MB	HD 6000	BGA 1168	15 W	14 nm	Direct Media Interface, Integrated GPU	January 2015
Core i7	5x00U	2 (4)	4 MB	HD 5500	BGA 1168	15 W	14 nm	Direct Media Interface, Integrated GPU	January 2015
Core i5	5xx7U	2 (2)	3 MB	Iris 6100	BGA 1168	28 W	14 nm	Direct Media Interface, Integrated GPU	January 2015
Core i5	5x50U	2 (2)	3 MB	HD 6000	BGA 1168	15 W	14 nm	Direct Media Interface, Integrated GPU	January 2015
Core i5	5x00U	2 (2)	3 MB	HD 5500	BGA 1168	15 W	14 nm	Direct Media Interface, Integrated GPU	January 2015
Core i3	5xx7U	2 (2)	3 MB	Iris 6100	BGA 1168	28 W	14 nm	Direct Media Interface, Integrated GPU	January 2015
Core i3	5xx5U	2 (2)	3 MB	HD 5500	BGA 1168	15 W	14 nm	Direct Media Interface, Integrated GPU	January 2015
Core i3	5xx0U	2 (2)	3 MB	HD 5500	BGA 1168	15 W	14 nm	Direct Media Interface, Integrated GPU	January 2015

Mobile Processors (Y-Series)

Processor branding	Model (list)	Cores (Threads)	L3 cache	GPU Model	Socket	TDP	Process	I/O Bus	Release Date
Core M	5Yxx	2 (2)	4 MB	HD 5300	BGA 1234	4.5 W	14 nm	Direct Media Interface, Integrated GPU	September 2014

=== 6th generation ===
==== Broadwell microarchitecture ====
Processor branding	Model (list)	Cores (Threads)	L3 cache	GPU Model	Socket	TDP	Process	I/O Bus	Release Date
Core i7	6800K	6 (12)	15 MB	N/A	LGA 2011-3	140 W	14 nm	Direct Media Interface	Q2'16
Core i7	6850K	6 (12)	15 MB	N/A	LGA 2011-3	140 W	14 nm	Direct Media Interface	Q2'16
Core i7	6900K	8 (16)	20 MB	N/A	LGA 2011-3	140 W	14 nm	Direct Media Interface	Q2'16
Core i7	6950X	10 (20)	25 MB	N/A	LGA 2011-3	140 W	14 nm	Direct Media Interface	Q2'16

==== Skylake microarchitecture ====
Skylake is the sixth generation Core processor microarchitecture, and was launched in August 2015 before i9 series. Being the successor to the Broadwell line, it is a redesign using the same 14 nm manufacturing process technology; however the redesign has better CPU and GPU performance and reduced power consumption. Intel also disabled overclocking non -K processors.

Desktop processors (DT-Series)
Processor branding	Model	Cores/Threads	L3 cache	GPU Model	Socket	TDP	Process	I/O Bus	Release date
Core i7	6700K	4/8	8 MB	HD 530	LGA 1151	91 W	14 nm	Direct Media Interface, Integrated GPU	August 2015
Core i7	6700	4/8	8 MB	HD 530	LGA 1151	65 W	14 nm	Direct Media Interface, Integrated GPU	September 2015
Core i7	6700T	4/8	8 MB	HD 530	LGA 1151	35 W	14 nm	Direct Media Interface, Integrated GPU	September 2015
Core i7	6785R	4/8	8 MB	Iris Pro 580	LGA 1151	65 W	14 nm	Direct Media Interface, Integrated GPU	May 2016
Core i5	6600K	4/4	6 MB	HD 530	LGA 1151	91 W	14 nm	Direct Media Interface, Integrated GPU	September 2015
Core i5	6600	4/4	6 MB	HD 530	LGA 1151	65 W	14 nm	Direct Media Interface, Integrated GPU	September 2015
Core i5	6500	4/4	6 MB	HD 530	LGA 1151	65 W	14 nm	Direct Media Interface, Integrated GPU	September 2015
Core i5	6400	4/4	6 MB	HD 530	LGA 1151	65 W	14 nm	Direct Media Interface, Integrated GPU	September 2015
Core i5	6402P	4/4	6 MB	HD 510	LGA 1151	65 W	14 nm	Direct Media Interface, Integrated GPU	December 2015
Core i5	6xx0R	4/4	6 MB	HD 530	LGA 1151	35 W	14 nm	Direct Media Interface, Integrated GPU	June 2016
Core i5	6xx0T	4/4	6 MB	HD 530	LGA 1151	35 W	14 nm	Direct Media Interface, Integrated GPU	September 2015
Core i3	6320	2/4	4 MB	HD 530	LGA 1151	51 W	14 nm	Direct Media Interface, Integrated GPU	September 2015
Core i3	6300	2/4	4 MB	HD 530	LGA 1151	51 W	14 nm	Direct Media Interface, Integrated GPU	September 2015
Core i3	6300T	2/4	4 MB	HD 530	LGA 1151	35 W	14 nm	Direct Media Interface, Integrated GPU	September 2015
Core i3	6100	2/4	3 MB	HD 530	LGA 1151	51 W	14 nm	Direct Media Interface, Integrated GPU	September 2015
Core i3	6100T	2/4	3 MB	HD 530	LGA 1151	35 W	14 nm	Direct Media Interface, Integrated GPU	September 2015
Core i3	6098P	2/4	3 MB	HD 510	LGA 1151	54 W	14 nm	Direct Media Interface, Integrated GPU	December 2015

Mobile processors (H-Series)
Processor branding	Model	Cores/Threads	L3 cache	GPU Model	Socket	TDP	Process	I/O Bus	Release date
Core i3	6100H	2/4	3 MB	HD 530	FBGA 1356	35 W	14 nm	Direct Media Interface, Integrated GPU	September 2015

Mobile processors (U-Series)
Processor branding	Model	Cores/Threads	L3 cache	GPU Model	Socket	TDP	Process	I/O Bus	Release date
Core i7	6650U	2/4	4 MB	Iris 540	FCBGA 1356	15 W	14 nm	Direct Media Interface, Integrated GPU	September 2015
Core i7	6600U	2/4	4 MB	HD 520	FCBGA 1356	25 W	14 nm	Direct Media Interface, Integrated GPU	September 2015
Core i7	6567U	2/4	4 MB	Iris 550	FCBGA 1356	28 W	14 nm	Direct Media Interface, Integrated GPU	September 2015
Core i7	6x60U	2/4	4 MB	Iris 540	FCBGA 1356	15 W	14 nm	Direct Media Interface, Integrated GPU	September 2015
Core i7	6x00U	2/4	4 MB	HD 520	FCBGA 1356	15 W	14 nm	Direct Media Interface, Integrated GPU	September 2015
Core i5	62x7U	2/4	4 MB	Iris 550	FCBGA 1356	28 W	14 nm	Direct Media Interface, Integrated GPU	September 2015
Core i5	6360U	2/4	4 MB	Iris 540	FCBGA 1356	9.5 W	14 nm	Direct Media Interface, Integrated GPU	September 2015
Core i5	6300U	2/4	4 MB	HD 520	FCBGA 1356	15 W	14 nm	Direct Media Interface, Integrated GPU	September 2015
Core i5	6260U	2/4	4 MB	Iris 540	FCBGA 1356	15 W	14 nm	Direct Media Interface, Integrated GPU	September 2015
Core i5	6200U	2/4	3 MB	HD 520	FCBGA 1356	15 W	14 nm	Direct Media Interface, Integrated GPU	September 2015
Core i3	6167U	2/4	3 MB	HD 550	FCBGA 1356	28 W	14 nm	Direct Media Interface, Integrated GPU	September 2015
Core i3	6100U	2/4	3 MB	HD 520	FCBGA 1356	15 W	14 nm	Direct Media Interface, Integrated GPU	September 2015
Core i3	6006U	2/4	3 MB	HD 520	FCBGA 1356	15 W	14 nm	Direct Media Interface, Integrated GPU	November 2016

Era of i9 series/Pre-Era of Core Ultra

=== 7th generation ===
==== Skylake microarchitecture ====
High-end Desktop processors (X-Series)
Processor branding	Model	Cores/Threads	L3 cache	Socket	TDP	Process	I/O Bus	Price
Core i9	7980XE	18/36	24.75 MB	LGA 2066	165 W	14 nm	Direct Media Interface	$1999
Core i9	7960X	16/32	22 MB	LGA 2066	165 W	14 nm	Direct Media Interface	$1699
Core i9	7940X	14/28	19.25 MB	LGA 2066	165 W	14 nm	Direct Media Interface	$1399
Core i9	7920X	12/24	16.5 MB	LGA 2066	140 W	14 nm	Direct Media Interface	$1199
Core i9	7900X	10/20	13.75 MB	LGA 2066	140 W	14 nm	Direct Media Interface	$999
Core i7	7820X	8/16	11 MB	LGA 2066	140 W	14 nm	Direct Media Interface	$599
Core i7	7800X	6/12	8.25 MB	LGA 2066	140 W	14 nm	Direct Media Interface	$389

==== Kaby Lake ====
Kaby Lake is the codename for the seventh generation Core processor, and was launched in October 2016 (mobile chips) and January 2017 (desktop chips). With the latest generation of microarchitecture, Intel decided to produce Kaby Lake processors without using their "tick–tock" manufacturing and design model. Kaby Lake features the same Skylake microarchitecture and is fabricated using Intel's 14 nanometer manufacturing process technology.

Built on an improved 14 nm process (14FF+), Kaby Lake features faster CPU clock speeds and Turbo frequencies. Beyond these process and clock speed changes, little of the CPU architecture has changed from Skylake, resulting in identical IPC.

Kaby Lake features a new graphics architecture to improve performance in 3D graphics and 4K video playback. It adds native High-bandwidth Digital Content Protection 2.2 support, along with fixed function decode of H.264/MPEG-4 AVC, High Efficiency Video Coding Main and Main10/10-bit, and VP9 10-bit and 8-bit video. Hardware encode is supported for H.264/MPEG-4 AVC, HEVC Main10/10-bit, and VP9 8-bit video. VP9 10-bit encode is not supported in hardware. OpenCL 2.1 is now supported.

Kaby Lake is the first Core architecture to support hyper-threading for the Pentium-branded desktop CPU SKU. Kaby Lake also features the first overclocking-enabled i3-branded CPU.

Features common to desktop Kaby Lake CPUs:

- LGA 1151 socket
- DMI 3.0 and PCIe 3.0 interfaces
- Dual channel memory support in the following configurations: DDR3L-1600 1.35 V (32 GiB maximum) or DDR4-2400 1.2 V (64 GiB maximum)
- A total of 16 PCIe lanes
- The Core-branded processors support the AVX2 instruction set. The Celeron and Pentium-branded ones support only SSE4.1/4.2
- 350 MHz base graphics clock rate
- No L4 cache (eDRAM).
- A release date of January 3, 2017

Desktop processors (S-Series)
Processor branding	Model	Cores (threads)	CPU clock rate	CPU Turbo clock rate			GPU model	Maximum GPU clock rate	L3 cache	TDP	Price (USD)
Processor branding	Model	Cores (threads)	CPU clock rate	Single core	Dual core	Quad core	GPU model	Maximum GPU clock rate	L3 cache	TDP	Price (USD)
Core i7	**7700K**	4 (8)	4.2 GHz	4.5 GHz	4.4 GHz	4.4 GHz	HD 630	1150 MHz	8 MB	91 W	$350
Core i7	7700	4 (8)	3.6 GHz	4.2 GHz	4.1 GHz	4.0 GHz	HD 630	1150 MHz	8 MB	65 W	$312
Core i7	7700T	4 (8)	2.9 GHz	3.8 GHz	3.7 GHz	3.6 GHz	HD 630	1150 MHz	8 MB	35 W	$312
Core i5	**7600K**	4 (4)	3.8 GHz	4.2 GHz	4.1 GHz	4.0 GHz	HD 630	1150 MHz	6 MB	91 W	$243
Core i5	7600	4 (4)	3.5 GHz	4.1 GHz	4.0 GHz	3.9 GHz	HD 630	1150 MHz	6 MB	65 W	$224
Core i5	7600T	4 (4)	2.8 GHz	3.7 GHz	3.6 GHz	3.5 GHz	HD 630	1100 MHz	6 MB	35 W	$224
Core i5	**7500**	4 (4)	3.4 GHz	3.8 GHz	3.7 GHz	3.6 GHz	HD 630	1100 MHz	6 MB	65 W	$202
Core i5	7500T	4 (4)	2.7 GHz	3.3 GHz	3.2 GHz	3.1 GHz	HD 630	1100 MHz	6 MB	35 W	$202
Core i5	**7400**	4 (4)	3.0 GHz	3.5 GHz	3.4 GHz	3.3 GHz	HD 630	1000 MHz	6 MB	65 W	$182
Core i5	7400T	4 (4)	2.4 GHz	3.0 GHz	2.9 GHz	2.7 GHz	HD 630	1000 MHz	6 MB	35 W	$187
Core i3	**7350K**	2 (4)	4.2 GHz	N/A			HD 630	1150 MHz	4 MB	60 W	$179
Core i3	7320	2 (4)	4.1 GHz	N/A			HD 630	1150 MHz	4 MB	51 W	$157
Core i3	**7300**	2 (4)	4.0 GHz	N/A			HD 630	1150 MHz	4 MB	51 W	$147
Core i3	7300T	2 (4)	3.5 GHz	N/A			HD 630	1100 MHz	4 MB	35 W	$147
Core i3	**7100**	2 (4)	3.9 GHz	N/A			HD 630	1100 MHz	3 MB	51 W	$117
Core i3	7100T	2 (4)	3.4 GHz	N/A			HD 630	1100 MHz	3 MB	35 W	$117
Core i3	7101E	2 (4)	3.9 GHz	N/A			HD 630	1100 MHz	3 MB	54 W	$117
Core i3	7101TE	2 (4)	3.4 GHz	N/A			HD 630	1100 MHz	3 MB	35 W	$117

Mobile Processors (H-Series)
Processor branding	Model	Cores (threads)	CPU clock rate	CPU Turbo clock rate			GPU	GPU clock rate		L3 cache	Max. PCIe lanes	TDP	cTDP		Release date	Price (USD)
Processor branding	Model	Cores (threads)	CPU clock rate	Single core	Dual core	Quad core	GPU	Base	Max.	L3 cache	Max. PCIe lanes	TDP	Up	Down	Release date	Price (USD)
Core i7	7920HQ	4 (8)	3.1 GHz	4.1 GHz	3.9 GHz	3.7 GHz	HD 630	350 MHz	1100 MHz	8 MB	16	45 W	N/A	35 W	Q1 2017	$568
Core i7	7820HQ	4 (8)	2.9 GHz	3.9 GHz	3.7 GHz	3.5 GHz	HD 630	350 MHz	1100 MHz	8 MB	16	45 W	N/A	35 W	Q1 2017	$378
Core i7	7820HK	4 (8)	2.9 GHz	3.9 GHz	3.7 GHz	3.5 GHz	HD 630	350 MHz	1100 MHz	8 MB	16	45 W	N/A	35 W	Q1 2017	$378
Core i7	7700HQ	4 (8)	2.8 GHz	3.8 GHz	3.6 GHz	3.4 GHz	HD 630	350 MHz	1100 MHz	6 MB	16	45 W	N/A	35 W	Q1 2017	$378
Core i5	7440HQ	4 (4)	2.8 GHz	3.8 GHz	3.6 GHz	3.4 GHz	HD 630	350 MHz	1000 MHz	6 MB	16	45 W	N/A	35 W	Q1 2017	$250
Core i5	7300HQ	4 (4)	2.5 GHz	3.5 GHz	3.3 GHz	3.1 GHz	HD 630	350 MHz	1000 MHz	6 MB	16	45 W	N/A	35 W	Q1 2017	$250
Core i3	7100H	2 (4)	3.0 GHz	N/A			HD 630	350 MHz	950 MHz	3 MB	16	35 W	N/A	N/A	Q1 2017	$225

Mobile Processors (U-Series)
Processor branding	Model	Cores (threads)	CPU clock rate	CPU Turbo clock rate		GPU	GPU clock rate		L3 cache	L4 cache	Max. PCIe lanes	TDP	cTDP		Release date	Price (USD)
Processor branding	Model	Cores (threads)	CPU clock rate	Single core	Dual core	GPU	Base	Max.	L3 cache	L4 cache	Max. PCIe lanes	TDP	Up	Down	Release date	Price (USD)
Core i7	7660U	2 (4)	2.5 GHz	4.0 GHz	?	Iris Plus 640	300 MHz	1100 MHz	4 MB	64 MB	12	15 W	N/A	9.5 W	Q1 2017	?
Core i7	7600U	2 (4)	2.8 GHz	3.9 GHz	?	HD 620	300 MHz	1150 MHz	4 MB	N/A	12	15 W	25 W	7.5 W	Q1 2017	$393
Core i7	7567U	2 (4)	3.5 GHz	4.0 GHz	?	Iris Plus 650	300 MHz	1150 MHz	4 MB	64 MB	12	28 W	N/A	23 W	Q1 2017	?
Core i7	7560U	2 (4)	2.4 GHz	3.8 GHz	?	Iris Plus 640	300 MHz	1050 MHz	4 MB	64 MB	12	15 W	N/A	9.5 W	Q1 2017	?
Core i7	7500U	2 (4)	2.7 GHz	3.5 GHz	?	HD 620	300 MHz	1050 MHz	4 MB	N/A	12	15 W	25 W	7.5 W	Q3 2016	$393
Core i5	7360U	2 (4)	2.3 GHz	3.6 GHz	?	Iris Plus 640	300 MHz	1000 MHz	4 MB	64 MB	12	15 W	N/A	9.5 W	Q1 2017	?
Core i5	7300U	2 (4)	2.6 GHz	3.5 GHz	?	HD 620	300 MHz	1100 MHz	3 MB	N/A	12	15 W	25 W	7.5 W	Q1 2017	$281
Core i5	7287U	2 (4)	3.3 GHz	3.7 GHz	?	Iris Plus 650	300 MHz	1100 MHz	4 MB	64 MB	12	28 W	N/A	23 W	Q1 2017	?
Core i5	7267U	2 (4)	3.1 GHz	3.5 GHz	?	Iris Plus 650	300 MHz	1050 MHz	4 MB	64 MB	12	28 W	N/A	23 W	Q1 2017	?
Core i5	7260U	2 (4)	2.2 GHz	3.4 GHz	?	Iris Plus 640	300 MHz	950 MHz	4 MB	64 MB	12	15 W	N/A	9.5 W	Q1 2017	?
Core i5	7200U	2 (4)	2.5 GHz	3.1 GHz	?	HD 620	300 MHz	1000 MHz	3 MB	N/A	12	15 W	25 W	7.5 W	Q3 2016	$281
Core i3	7167U	2 (4)	2.8 GHz	N/A	?	Iris Plus 650	300 MHz	1000 MHz	3 MB	64 MB	12	28 W	N/A	23 W	Q1 2017	?
Core i3	7100U	2 (4)	2.4 GHz	N/A	?	HD 620	300 MHz	1000 MHz	3 MB	N/A	12	15 W	N/A	7.5 W	Q3 2016	$281

Mobile Processors (Y-Series)
Processor branding	Model	Cores (threads)	CPU clock rate	CPU Turbo clock rate		GPU	GPU clock rate		L3 cache	Max. PCIe lanes	TDP	cTDP		Release date	Price (USD)
Processor branding	Model	Cores (threads)	CPU clock rate	Single core	Dual core	GPU	Base	Max.	L3 cache	Max. PCIe lanes	TDP	Up	Down	Release date	Price (USD)
Core i7	7Y75	2 (4)	1.3 GHz	3.6 GHz	3.4 GHz	HD 615	300 MHz	1050 MHz	4 MB	10	4.5 W	7 W	3.5 W	Q3 2016	$393
Core i5	7Y57	2 (4)	1.2 GHz	3.3 GHz	2.9 GHz	HD 615	300 MHz	950 MHz	4 MB	10	4.5 W	7 W	3.5 W	Q1 2017	$281
Core i5	7Y54	2 (4)	1.2 GHz	3.2 GHz	2.8 GHz	HD 615	300 MHz	950 MHz	4 MB	10	4.5 W	7 W	3.5 W	Q3 2016	$281
Core i3	7Y30	2 (4)	1.0 GHz	2.6 GHz	?	HD 615	300 MHz	900 MHz	4 MB	10	4.5 W	7 W	3.5 W	Q3 2016	$281
Core i3	7Y32	2 (4)	1.1 GHz	3.0 GHz	?	HD 615	300 MHz	900 MHz	4 MB	10	4.5 W	7 W	3.5 W	Q2 2017	$281

Kaby Lake-X processors are modified versions of Kaby Lake-S processors that fit into the LGA 2066 socket. However, they can't take advantage of the unique features of the platform.

High-end Desktop processors (X-Series)
Processor branding	Model	Cores (threads)	CPU clock rate	CPU Turbo clock rate			L3 cache	TDP	Price (USD)
Processor branding	Model	Cores (threads)	CPU clock rate	Single core	Dual core	Quad core	L3 cache	TDP	Price (USD)
Core i7	7740X	4 (8)	4.3 GHz	4.5 GHz	4.4 GHz	4.4 GHz	8 MB	112 W	$339
Core i5	7640X	4 (4)	4.0 GHz	4.2 GHz	4.1 GHz	4.0 GHz	6 MB	112 W	$242

=== 8th generation ===
==== Kaby Lake Refresh ====
Mobile processors (U-Series)
Processor branding	Model	Cores (threads)	CPU clock rate	CPU Turbo clock rate			GPU	GPU clock rate		L3 cache	L4 cache	Max. PCIe lanes	TDP	cTDP		Release date	Price (USD)
Processor branding	Model	Cores (threads)	CPU clock rate	Single core	Dual core	Quad core	GPU	Base	Max.	L3 cache	L4 cache	Max. PCIe lanes	TDP	Up	Down	Release date	Price (USD)
Core i7	8650U	4 (8)	1.9 GHz	4.2 GHz		3.9 GHz	UHD 620	300 MHz	1150 MHz	8 MB	—N/a	12	15 W	25 W	10 W	Q3 2017	$409
Core i7	8550U	4 (8)	1.8 GHz	4.0 GHz		3.7 GHz	UHD 620	300 MHz	1150 MHz	8 MB	—N/a	12	15 W	25 W	10 W	Q3 2017	$409
Core i5	8350U	4 (8)	1.7 GHz	3.6 GHz			UHD 620	300 MHz	1100 MHz	6 MB	—N/a	12	15 W	25 W	10 W	Q3 2017	$297
Core i5	8250U	4 (8)	1.6 GHz	3.4 GHz			UHD 620	300 MHz	1100 MHz	6 MB	—N/a	12	15 W	25 W	10 W	Q3 2017	$297

==== Coffee Lake microarchitecture ====
Coffee Lake is a codename for the eighth generation Intel Core family and was launched in October 2017. For the first time in the ten-year history of Intel Core processors, the Coffee Lake generation features an increase in core counts across the desktop lineup of processors, a significant drive of improved performance versus previous generations despite similar per-clock performance.

Increase in number of CPU cores in desktop Coffee Lake processors
	Kaby Lake (7th Generation)	Coffee Lake (8th Generation)
	Cores / Threads	Cores / Threads
Core i3	2 / 4	4 / 4
Core i5	4 / 4	6 / 6
Core i7	4 / 8	6 / 12

* Intel Hyper-threading capabilities allow an enabled processor to execute two threads per physical core

Coffee Lake features largely the same CPU core and performance per MHz as Skylake/Kaby Lake. Features specific to Coffee Lake include:

- Following similar refinements to the 14 nm process in Skylake and Kaby Lake, Coffee Lake is the third 14 nm process refinement ("14nm++") and features increased transistor gate pitch for a lower current density and higher leakage transistors which allows higher peak power and higher frequency at the expense of die area and idle power.
- Coffee Lake will be used in conjunction with the 300-series chipset and is incompatible with the older 100- and 200-series chipsets.
- Increased L3 cache in accordance to the number of cores
- Increased turbo clock speeds across i5 and i7 CPUs models (increased by up to 200 MHz)
- Increased iGPU clock speeds by 50 MHz
- DDR4 memory support updated for 2666 MHz (for i5 and i7 parts) and 2400 MHz (for i3 parts); DDR3 memory is no longer supported

Desktop processors (S-Series)
Processor branding	Model	Cores (threads)	Base CPU clock rate	Turbo clock rate [GHz]						GPU	max GPU clock rate	L3 cache	TDP	Memory support	Price (USD)
Processor branding	Model	Cores (threads)	Base CPU clock rate	Number of cores used						GPU	max GPU clock rate	L3 cache	TDP	Memory support	Price (USD)
Processor branding	Model	Cores (threads)	Base CPU clock rate	1	2	3	4	5	6	GPU	max GPU clock rate	L3 cache	TDP	Memory support	Price (USD)
Core i7	8086K	6 (12)	4.0 GHz	5.0	4.6	4.5	4.4		4.3	UHD 630	1.20 GHz	12 MB	95 W	DDR4 2666	$425
Core i7	8700K	6 (12)	3.7 GHz	4.7	4.6	4.5	4.4		4.3	UHD 630	1.20 GHz	12 MB	95 W	DDR4 2666	$359
Core i7	8700	6 (12)	3.2 GHz	4.6	4.5	4.4	4.3			UHD 630	1.20 GHz	12 MB	65 W	DDR4 2666	$303
Core i7	8700T	6 (12)	2.4 GHz	4.0	4.0	3.9		3.8		UHD 630	1.20 GHz	12 MB	35 W	DDR4 2666	$303
Core i5	8600K	6 (6)	3.6 GHz	4.3	4.2			4.1		UHD 630	1.15 GHz	9 MB	95 W	DDR4 2666	$257
Core i5	8600	6 (6)	3.1 GHz	4.3	4.2			4.1		UHD 630	1.15 GHz	9 MB	65 W	DDR4 2666	$213
Core i5	8600T	6 (6)	2.3 GHz	3.7	3.6			3.5		UHD 630	1.15 GHz	9 MB	35 W	DDR4 2666	$213
Core i5	8500	6 (6)	3.0 GHz	4.1	4.0			3.9		UHD 630	1.10 GHz	9 MB	65 W	DDR4 2666	$192
Core i5	8500T	6 (6)	2.1 GHz	3.5	3.4	3.3		3.2		UHD 630	1.10 GHz	9 MB	35 W	DDR4 2666	$192
Core i5	8400	6 (6)	2.8 GHz	4.0	3.9			3.8		UHD 630	1.05 GHz	9 MB	65 W	DDR4 2666	$182
Core i5	8400T	6 (6)	1.7 GHz	3.3	3.2	3.1		3.0		UHD 630	1.05 GHz	9 MB	35 W	DDR4 2666	$182
Core i3	8350K	4 (4)	4.0 GHz	—N/a						UHD 630	1.15 GHz	8 MB	91 W	DDR4 2400	$168
Core i3	8300	4 (4)	3.7 GHz	—N/a						UHD 630	1.15 GHz	8 MB	62 W	DDR4 2400	$138
Core i3	8300T	4 (4)	3.2 GHz	—N/a						UHD 630	1.15 GHz	8 MB	35 W	DDR4 2400	$138
Core i3	8100	4 (4)	3.6 GHz	—N/a						UHD 630	1.10 GHz	6 MB	65 W	DDR4 2400	$117
Core i3	8100T	4 (4)	3.1 GHz	—N/a						UHD 630	1.10 GHz	6 MB	35 W	DDR4 2400	$117

* Processors Core i3-8100 and Core i3-8350K with stepping B0 actually belong to "Kaby Lake-S" family

Mobile processors (H-Series)
Processor branding	Model	Cores (threads)	CPU clock rate	Max. Turbo clock rate	GPU	GPU clock rate		L3 cache	TDP	cTDP		Price (USD)
Processor branding	Model	Cores (threads)	CPU clock rate	Max. Turbo clock rate	GPU	Base	Max.	L3 cache	TDP	Down	Up	Price (USD)
Core i7	8850H	6 (12)	2.6 GHz	4.3 GHz	UHD 630	350 MHz	1.15 GHz	9 MB	45 W	35 W	N/A	$395
Core i7	8750H	6 (12)	2.2 GHz	4.1 GHz	UHD 630	350 MHz	1.10 GHz	9 MB	45 W	35 W	N/A	$395
Core i7	8700B	6 (12)	3.2 GHz	4.6 GHz	UHD 630	350 MHz	1.20 GHz	12 MB	65 W	35 W	N/A	$303
Core i5	8500B	6 (6)	3.0 GHz	4.1 GHz	UHD 630	350 MHz	1.10 GHz	9 MB	65 W	35 W	N/A	$192
Core i5	8400B	6 (6)	2.8 GHz	4.0 GHz	UHD 630	350 MHz	1.05 GHz	9 MB	65 W	35 W	N/A	$182
Core i5	8400H	4 (8)	2.5 GHz	4.2 GHz	UHD 630	350 MHz	1.10 GHz	8 MB	45 W	35 W	N/A	$250
Core i5	8300H	4 (8)	2.3 GHz	4.0 GHz	UHD 630	350 MHz	1.00 GHz	8 MB	45 W	35 W	N/A	$250
Core i3	8100H	4 (4)	3.0 GHz	N/A	UHD 630	350 MHz	1.00 GHz	6 MB	45 W	35 W	N/A	$225

Mobile processors (U-Series)
Processor branding	Model	Cores (threads)	CPU clock rate	Max. Turbo clock rate	GPU	GPU clock rate		L3 cache	L4 cache (eDRAM)	TDP	cTDP		Price (USD)
Processor branding	Model	Cores (threads)	CPU clock rate	Max. Turbo clock rate	GPU	Base	Max.	L3 cache	L4 cache (eDRAM)	TDP	Down	Up	Price (USD)
Core i7	8559U	4 (8)	2.7 GHz	4.5 GHz	Iris Plus 655	300 MHz	1.20 GHz	8 MB	128 MB	28 W	20 W	N/A	$431
Core i5	8269U	4 (8)	2.6 GHz	4.2 GHz	Iris Plus 655	300 MHz	1.10 GHz	6 MB	128 MB	28 W	20 W	N/A	$320
Core i5	8259U	4 (8)	2.3 GHz	3.8 GHz	Iris Plus 655	300 MHz	1.05 GHz	6 MB	N/A	28 W	20 W	N/A	
Core i3	8109U	2 (4)	3.0 GHz	3.6 GHz	UHD 630	300 MHz	1.10 GHz	4 MB	N/A	28 W	20 W	N/A	

==== Amber Lake microarchitecture ====
Amber Lake is a refinement over the low power Mobile Kaby Lake CPUs.

Mobile Processors (Y-Series)
Processor branding	Model	Cores (threads)	CPU clock rate		GPU	Max GPU clock rate	L3 cache	TDP	cTDP		Price
Processor branding	Model	Cores (threads)	Base	Max turbo	GPU	Max GPU clock rate	L3 cache	TDP	Up	Down	Price
Core i7	8510Y	2 (4)	1.8 GHz	3.9 GHz	UHD 617	1050 MHz	4 MB	7 W	N/A		$393
Core i7	8500Y	2 (4)	1.5 GHz	4.2 GHz	UHD 615	1050 MHz	4 MB	5 W	7 W	3.5 W	$393
Core i5	8310Y	2 (4)	1.6 GHz	3.9 GHz	UHD 617	1050 MHz	4 MB	7 W	N/A		$281
Core i5	8210Y	2 (4)	1.6 GHz	3.6 GHz	UHD 617	1050 MHz	4 MB	7 W	N/A		$281
Core i5	8200Y	2 (4)	1.3 GHz	3.9 GHz	UHD 615	950 MHz	4 MB	5 W	7 W	3.5 W	$291
Core m3	8100Y	2 (4)	1.1 GHz	3.4 GHz	UHD 615	900 MHz	4 MB	5 W	8 W	4.5 W	$281

==== Whiskey Lake microarchitecture ====
Whiskey Lake is Intel's codename for the third 14 nm Skylake process-refinement, following Kaby Lake Refresh and Coffee Lake. Intel announced low power mobile Whiskey Lake CPUs availability on August 28, 2018. It has not yet been advertised whether this CPU architecture contains hardware mitigations for Meltdown/Spectre class vulnerabilities—various sources contain conflicting information. Unofficially it was announced that Whiskey Lake has hardware mitigations against Meltdown and L1TF while Spectre V2 requires software mitigations as well as microcode/firmware update.

Mobile processors (U-Series)
Processor branding	Model	Cores (threads)	CPU clock rate	Turbo clock GHz Num of cores			GPU	Max GPU clock rate	L3 cache	cTDP		Memory	Price
Processor branding	Model	Cores (threads)	CPU clock rate	1	2	4	GPU	Max GPU clock rate	L3 cache	Up	Down	Memory	Price
Core i7	8665U	4 (8)	1.9 GHz	4.8			UHD; 620	1150 MHz	8 MB	25 W	10 W	DDR4-2400 LPDDR3-2133	$409
Core i7	8565U	4 (8)	1.8 GHz	4.6	4.5	4.1	UHD; 620	1150 MHz	8 MB	25 W	10 W	DDR4-2400 LPDDR3-2133	$409
Core i5	8365U	4 (8)	1.6 GHz	4.1			UHD; 620	1100 MHz	6 MB	25 W	10 W	DDR4-2400 LPDDR3-2133	$297
Core i5	8265U	4 (8)	1.6 GHz	3.9	3.9	3.7	UHD; 620	1100 MHz	6 MB	25 W	10 W	DDR4-2400 LPDDR3-2133	$297
Core i3	8145U	2 (4)	2.1 GHz	3.9	3.7	—N/a	UHD; 620	1000 MHz	4 MB	25 W	10 W	DDR4-2400 LPDDR3-2133	$281

==== Cannon Lake microarchitecture ====
Cannon Lake (formerly Skymont) is Intel's codename for the 10 nanometer die shrink of the Kaby Lake microarchitecture. As a die shrink, Cannon Lake is a new process in Intel's "process–architecture–optimization" execution plan as the next step in semiconductor fabrication. Cannon Lake are the first mainstream CPUs to include the AVX-512 instruction set. In comparison to the previous generation AVX2 (AVX-256), the new generation AVX-512 most notably provides double the width of data registers and double the number of registers. These enhancements would allow for twice the number of floating point operations per register due to the increased width in addition to doubling the overall number of registers, resulting in theoretical performance improvements of up to four times the performance of AVX2.

At CES 2018, Intel announced that they had started shipping mobile Cannon Lake CPUs at the end of 2017 and that they would ramp up production in 2018. No further details were disclosed.

Mobile processors (U-Series)
Processor branding	Model	Cores (threads)	CPU clock rate	CPU Turbo clock rate	GPU	GPU clock rate		L3 cache	TDP	cTDP	Price (USD)
Processor branding	Model	Cores (threads)	CPU clock rate	CPU Turbo clock rate	GPU	Base	Max.	L3 cache	TDP	Down	Price (USD)
Core i3	8121U	2 (4)	2.2 GHz	3.2 GHz	N/A			4 MB	15 W	N/A	?

=== 9th generation ===
==== Skylake microarchitecture ====
The 9th generation Coffee Lake CPUs are updated versions of previous Skylake X-Series CPUs with clockspeed improvements.

High-end Desktop processors (X-Series)
Processor branding	Model	Cores/Threads	Base Clock	Single Core Turbo Clock	L3 cache	TDP	Price
Core i9	9980XE	18/36	3.0 GHz	4.5 GHz	24.75 MB	165 W	$1979
Core i9	9960X	16/32	3.1 GHz	4.5 GHz	22 MB	165 W	$1684
Core i9	9940X	14/28	3.3 GHz	4.5 GHz	19.25 MB	165 W	$1387
Core i9	9920X	12/24	3.5 GHz	4.5 GHz	19.25 MB	165 W	$1189
Core i9	9900X	10/20	3.5 GHz	4.5 GHz	19.25 MB	165 W	$989
Core i9	9820X	10/20	3.3 GHz	4.2 GHz	16.5 MB	165 W	$889
Core i7	9800X	8/16	3.8 GHz	4.5 GHz	16.5 MB	165 W	$589

==== Coffee Lake Refresh microarchitecture ====
The 9th generation Coffee Lake CPUs were released in the fourth quarter of 2018. They include hardware mitigations against certain Meltdown/Spectre vulnerabilities.

For the first time in Intel consumer CPU history, these CPUs support up to 128 GB RAM.

Increase in number of CPU cores in desktop 9th Generation processors
	8th Generation	9th Generation
	Cores / Threads	Cores / Threads
Core i3	4 / 4	4 / 4
Core i5	6 / 6	6 / 6
Core i7	6 / 12	8 / 8
Core i9	6 / 12	8 / 16

* Intel Hyper-threading capabilities allow an enabled processor to execute two threads per physical core

Even though the F suffix CPUs lack an integrated GPU, Intel set the same price for these CPUs as their featureful counterparts.

Desktop processors (S-Series)
Processor branding	Model	Cores (Threads)	Base CPU clock rate	Turbo clock rate [GHz]								GPU	max GPU clock rate	L3 cache	TDP	Memory support	Price (USD)
Processor branding	Model	Cores (Threads)	Base CPU clock rate	Number of cores used								GPU	max GPU clock rate	L3 cache	TDP	Memory support	Price (USD)
Processor branding	Model	Cores (Threads)	Base CPU clock rate	1	2	3	4	5	6	7	8	GPU	max GPU clock rate	L3 cache	TDP	Memory support	Price (USD)
Core i9	9900KS	8 (16)	4.0 GHz	5.0								UHD 630	1.20 GHz	16 MB	127 W *	DDR4-2666	$524
Core i9	9900K	8 (16)	3.6 GHz	5.0		4.8		4.7				UHD 630	1.20 GHz	16 MB	95 W *	DDR4-2666	$488
Core i9	9900KF	8 (16)	3.6 GHz	5.0		4.8		4.7				—N/a		16 MB	95 W *	DDR4-2666	$488
Core i7	9700K	8 (8)	3.6 GHz	4.9	4.8	4.7		4.6				UHD 630	1.20 GHz	12 MB	95 W	DDR4-2666	$374
Core i7	9700KF	8 (8)	3.6 GHz	4.9	4.8	4.7		4.6				—N/a		12 MB	95 W	DDR4-2666	$374
Core i5	9600K	6 (6)	3.7 GHz	4.6	4.5	4.4		4.3		—N/a		UHD 630	1.15 GHz	9 MB	95 W	DDR4-2666	$262
Core i5	9600KF	6 (6)	3.7 GHz	4.6	4.5	4.4		4.3		—N/a		—N/a		9 MB	95 W	DDR4-2666	$262
Core i5	9400	6 (6)	2.9 GHz	4.1						—N/a		UHD 630	1.05 GHz	9 MB	65 W	DDR4-2666	$182
Core i5	9400F	6 (6)	2.9 GHz	4.1						—N/a		—N/a		9 MB	65 W	DDR4-2666	$182
Core i3	9350KF	4 (4)	4.0 GHz	4.6						—N/a		—N/a		8 MB	91 W	DDR4-2400	$173
Core i3	9100F	4 (4)	3.6 GHz	4.2						—N/a		—N/a		6 MB	65 W	DDR4-2400	$122
Core i3	9100	4 (4)	3.6 GHz	4.2						—N/a		UHD 630	1.1 GHz	6 MB	65 W	DDR4-2400	$122

* various reviews show that the Core i9 9900K CPU may consume over 140 W under load. The Core i9 9900KS may consume even more.

Mobile processors (H-Series)
Processor branding	Model	Cores (Threads)	Base CPU clock rate	Single Core Turbo clock rate [GHz]	GPU	Max GPU clock rate	L3 cache	TDP	Memory support	Price (USD)
Core i9	9980HK	8 (16)	2.4 GHz	5.0	HD 630	1.25 GHz	16 MB	45 W	DDR4-2666	$583
Core i9	9880H	8 (16)	2.3 GHz	4.8	HD 630	1.20 GHz	16 MB	45 W	DDR4-2666	$556
Core i7	9850H	6 (12)	2.6 GHz	4.6	HD 630	1.15 GHz	12 MB	45 W	DDR4-2666	$395
Core i7	9750H	6 (12)	2.6 GHz	4.5	HD 630	1.15 GHz	12 MB	45 W	DDR4-2666	$395
Core i5	9400H	4 (8)	2.5 GHz	4.3	HD 630	1.10 GHz	8 MB	45 W	DDR4-2666	$250
Core i5	9300H	4 (8)	2.4 GHz	4.1	HD 630	1.05 GHz	8 MB	45 W	DDR4-2666	$250

=== 10th generation ===
==== Cascade Lake microarchitecture ====
Cascade Lake X-Series CPUs are the 10th generation versions of the previous Skylake X-Series CPUs. They offer minor clockspeed improvements and a highly reduced price.

High-end Desktop processors (X-Series)
Processor branding	Model	Cores/Threads	Base Clock	Single Core Turbo Clock	All Core Turbo Clock	L3 cache	TDP	Price
Core i9	10980XE	18/36	3.0 GHz	4.8 GHz	3.8 GHz	24.75 MB	165 W	$979
Core i9	10940X	14/28	3.3 GHz	4.8 GHz	4.1 GHz	19.25 MB	165 W	$784
Core i9	10920X	12/24	3.5 GHz	4.8 GHz	4.3 GHz	19.25 MB	165 W	$689
Core i9	10900X	10/20	3.7 GHz	4.7 GHz	4.3 GHz	19.25 MB	165 W	$590

==== Ice Lake microarchitecture ====
Ice Lake is codename for Intel's 10th generation Intel Core processors, representing an enhancement of the 'architecture' of the preceding generation Kaby Lake/Cannon Lake processors (as specified in Intel's process–architecture–optimization execution plan). As the successor to Cannon Lake, Ice Lake uses Intel's newer 10 nm+ fabrication process, and is powered by the Sunny Cove microarchitecture.

Ice Lake are the first Intel CPUs to feature in-silicon mitigations for the hardware vulnerabilities discovered in 2017, Meltdown and Spectre. These side-channel attacks exploit branch prediction's use of speculative execution. These exploits may cause the CPU to reveal cached private information which the exploiting process is not intended to be able to access as a form of timing attack.

Mobile processors (U-Series)
Processor branding	Model	Cores (threads)	Base CPU clock rate	Turbo clock GHz Num of cores			GPU			L3 cache	TDP	cTDP		Price
Processor branding	Model	Cores (threads)	Base CPU clock rate	1	2	4	Series	EUs	Max clock rate	L3 cache	TDP	Up	Down	Price
Core i7	1065G7	4 (8)	1.3 GHz	3.9		3.5	Iris Plus	64	1.1 GHz	8 MiB	15 W	25 W	12 W	$426
Core i5	1035G7	4 (8)	1.2 GHz	3.7		3.3	Iris Plus	64	1.05 GHz	6 MiB	15 W	25 W	12 W	$320
Core i5	1035G4	4 (8)	1.1 GHz	3.7		3.3	Iris Plus	48	1.05 GHz	6 MiB	15 W	25 W	12 W	$309
Core i5	1035G1	4 (8)	1.0 GHz	3.6		3.3	UHD	32	1.05 GHz	6 MiB	15 W	25 W	13 W	$297
Core i3	1005G1	2 (4)	1.2 GHz	3.4			UHD	32	0.9 GHz	4 MiB	15 W	25 W	13 W	$281

Mobile processors (Y-Series)
Processor branding	Model	Cores (threads)	Base CPU clock rate	Turbo clock GHz Num of cores			GPU			L3 cache	TDP	cTDP		Price
Processor branding	Model	Cores (threads)	Base CPU clock rate	1	2	4	Series	EUs	Max clock rate	L3 cache	TDP	Up	Down	Price
Core i7	1060G7	4 (8)	1.0 GHz	3.8		3.4	Iris Plus	64	1.1 GHz	8 MiB	9 W	12 W		
Core i5	1030G7	4 (8)	0.8 GHz	3.5		3.2	Iris Plus	64	1.1 GHz	6 MiB	9 W	12 W		
Core i5	1030G4	4 (8)	0.7 GHz	3.5		3.2	Iris Plus	48	1.1 GHz	6 MiB	9 W	12 W		
Core i3	1000NG4	2 (4)	1.1 GHz	3.2			Iris Plus	48	0.9 GHz	4 MiB	9 W			
Core i3	1000G4	2 (4)	1.1 GHz	3.2			Iris Plus	48	0.9 GHz	4 MiB	9 W	12 W		
Core i3	1000G1	2 (4)	1.1 GHz	3.2			UHD	32	0.9 GHz	4 MiB	9 W	12 W		

==== Comet Lake microarchitecture ====
Comet Lake is Intel's codename for the fourth 14 nm Skylake process-refinement, following Whiskey Lake. Intel announced low power mobile Comet Lake CPUs availability on August 21, 2019.

Increase in number of CPU cores in desktop 10th generation processors
	9th generation	10th generation
	Cores / threads	Cores / threads
Core i3	4 / 4	4 / 8
Core i5	6 / 6	6 / 12
Core i7	8 / 8	8 / 16
Core i9	8 / 16	10 / 20

Desktop processors (S-Series)
Processor branding	Model	Cores (Threads)	CPU clock rate (GHz)				GPU		Smart cache (MB)	TDP		Memory support	Price (USD)
Processor branding	Model	Cores (Threads)	Base	All-Core Turbo	Turbo Boost 2.0	Turbo Boost Max 3.0	Model	max clock rate (GHz)	Smart cache (MB)	TDP		Memory support	Price (USD)
Processor branding	Model	Cores (Threads)	Base	All-Core Turbo	Turbo Boost 2.0	Turbo Boost Max 3.0	Model	max clock rate (GHz)	Smart cache (MB)	Down	Base	Memory support	Price (USD)
Core i9	10900K	10 (20)	3.7	4.8	5.1	5.2	UHD 630	1.20	20	95	125	DDR4-2933 2-channel up to 128 GB	$488
Core i9	10900KF	10 (20)	3.7	4.8	5.1	5.2	—N/a		20	95	125	DDR4-2933 2-channel up to 128 GB	$472
Core i9	10910	10 (20)	3.6	4.7	5.0	—N/a	UHD 630	1.20	20	95	125	DDR4-2933 2-channel up to 128 GB	OEM
Core i9	10900	10 (20)	2.8	4.5	5.0	5.1	UHD 630	1.20	20	—N/a	65	DDR4-2933 2-channel up to 128 GB	$438
Core i9	10900F	10 (20)	2.8	4.5	5.0	5.1	—N/a		20	—N/a	65	DDR4-2933 2-channel up to 128 GB	$422
Core i9	10900T	10 (20)	1.9	3.7	4.5	4.6	UHD 630	1.20	20	25	35	DDR4-2933 2-channel up to 128 GB	$438
Core i9	10850K	10 (20)	3.6	4.7	5.0	5.1	UHD 630	1.20	20	95	125	DDR4-2933 2-channel up to 128 GB	$453
Core i7	10700K	8 (16)	3.8	4.7	5.0	5.1	UHD 630	1.20	16	95	125	DDR4-2933 2-channel up to 128 GB	$374
Core i7	10700KF	8 (16)	3.8	4.7	5.0	5.1	—N/a		16	95	125	DDR4-2933 2-channel up to 128 GB	$349
Core i7	10700	8 (16)	2.9	4.6	4.7	4.8	UHD 630	1.20	16	—N/a	65	DDR4-2933 2-channel up to 128 GB	$323
Core i7	10700F	8 (16)	2.9	4.6	4.7	4.8	—N/a		16	—N/a	65	DDR4-2933 2-channel up to 128 GB	$298
Core i7	10700T	8 (16)	2.0	3.7	4.4	4.5	UHD 630	1.20	16	25	35	DDR4-2933 2-channel up to 128 GB	$325
Core i5	10600K	6 (12)	4.1	4.5	4.8	—N/a	UHD 630	1.20	12	95	125	DDR4-2666 2-channel up to 128 GB	$262
Core i5	10600KF	6 (12)	4.1	4.5	4.8	—N/a	—N/a		12	95	125	DDR4-2666 2-channel up to 128 GB	$237
Core i5	10600	6 (12)	3.3	4.4	4.8	—N/a	UHD 630	1.20	12	—N/a	65	DDR4-2666 2-channel up to 128 GB	$213
Core i5	10600T	6 (12)	2.4	3.7	4.0	—N/a	UHD 630	1.20	12	25	35	DDR4-2666 2-channel up to 128 GB	$213
Core i5	10500	6 (12)	3.1	4.2	4.5	—N/a	UHD 630	1.15	12	—N/a	65	DDR4-2666 2-channel up to 128 GB	$192
Core i5	10500T	6 (12)	2.3	3.5	3.8	—N/a	UHD 630	1.15	12	25	35	DDR4-2666 2-channel up to 128 GB	$192
Core i5	10400	6 (12)	2.9	4.0	4.3	—N/a	UHD 630	1.10	12	—N/a	65	DDR4-2666 2-channel up to 128 GB	$182
Core i5	10400F	6 (12)	2.9	4.0	4.3	—N/a	—N/a		12	—N/a	65	DDR4-2666 2-channel up to 128 GB	$157
Core i5	10400T	6 (12)	2.0	3.2	3.6	—N/a	UHD 630	1.10	12	25	35	DDR4-2666 2-channel up to 128 GB	$182
Core i3	10320	4 (8)	3.8	4.4	4.6	—N/a	UHD 630	1.15	8	—N/a	65	DDR4-2666 2-channel up to 128 GB	$154
Core i3	10300	4 (8)	3.7	4.2	4.4	—N/a	UHD 630	1.15	8	—N/a	65	DDR4-2666 2-channel up to 128 GB	$143
Core i3	10300T	4 (8)	3.0	3.6	3.9	—N/a	UHD 630	1.10	8	25	35	DDR4-2666 2-channel up to 128 GB	$143
Core i3	10100	4 (8)	3.6	4.1	4.3	—N/a	UHD 630	1.10	6	—N/a	65	DDR4-2666 2-channel up to 128 GB	$122
Core i3	10100F	4 (8)	3.6	4.1	4.3	—N/a	—N/a		6	—N/a	65	DDR4-2666 2-channel up to 128 GB	$79 - $97
Core i3	10100T	4 (8)	3.0	3.5	3.8	—N/a	UHD 630	1.10	6	25	35	DDR4-2666 2-channel up to 128 GB	p

Mobile processors (H-Series)
Processor branding	Model	Cores (Threads)	CPU clock speed (GHz)		GPU		Smart cache (MB)	TDP (W)			Memory support	Price (USD)
Processor branding	Model	Cores (Threads)	Base	Max. Turbo	Model	Max. freq. (GHz)	Smart cache (MB)	TDP (W)			Memory support	Price (USD)
Processor branding	Model	Cores (Threads)	Base	Max. Turbo	Model	Max. freq. (GHz)	Smart cache (MB)	Down	Base	Up	Memory support	Price (USD)
Core i9	10980HK	8 (16)	2.4	5.3	UHD 630	1.25	16	—N/a	45	65	DDR4-2933 2-channel up to 128 GB	$583
Core i9	10885H	8 (16)	2.4	5.3	UHD 630	1.25	16	35	45	—N/a	DDR4-2933 2-channel up to 128 GB	$556
Core i7	10875H	8 (16)	2.3	5.1	UHD 630	1.20	16	35	45	—N/a	DDR4-2933 2-channel up to 128 GB	$450
Core i7	10870H	8 (16)	2.2	5.0	UHD 630	1.20	16	35	45	—N/a	DDR4-2933 2-channel up to 128 GB	$417
Core i7	10850H	6 (12)	2.7	5.1	UHD 630	1.15	12	35	45	—N/a	DDR4-2933 2-channel up to 128 GB	$395
Core i7	10750H	6 (12)	2.6	5.0	UHD 630	1.15	12	35	45	—N/a	DDR4-2933 2-channel up to 128 GB	$395
Core i5	10500H	6 (12)	2.5	4.5	UHD 630	1.05	12	35	45	—N/a	DDR4-2933 2-channel up to 128 GB	$250
Core i5	10400H	4 (8)	2.6	4.6	UHD 630	1.10	8	35	45	—N/a	DDR4-2933 2-channel up to 128 GB	$250
Core i5	10300H	4 (8)	2.5	4.5	UHD 630	1.05	8	35	45	—N/a	DDR4-2933 2-channel up to 128 GB	$250
Core i5	10200H	4 (8)	2.4	4.1	UHD 610	1.05	8	35	45	—N/a	DDR4-2933 2-channel up to 128 GB	$250

Mobile processors (U-Series)
Processor branding	Model	Cores (Threads)	CPU clock speed (GHz)		GPU		L3 cache (MB)	TDP			Memory support	Price (USD)
Processor branding	Model	Cores (Threads)	Base	Max. Turbo	Model	Max. freq.	L3 cache (MB)	TDP			Memory support	Price (USD)
Processor branding	Model	Cores (Threads)	Base	Max. Turbo	Model	Max. freq.	L3 cache (MB)	Down	Base	Up	Memory support	Price (USD)
Core i7	10810U	6 (12)	1.1	4.9	UHD 620	1.15	12	12.5	15	25	DDR4-2666 LPDDR3-2133	$443
Core i7	10710U	6 (12)	1.1	4.7	UHD 620	1.15	12	12.5	15	25	DDR4-2666 LPDDR3-2133	$443
Core i7	10610U	4 (8)	1.8	4.9	UHD 620	1.15	8	10	15	25	DDR4-2666 LPDDR3-2133	$409
Core i7	10510U	4 (8)	1.8	4.9	UHD 620	1.15	8	10	15	25	DDR4-2666 LPDDR3-2133	$409
Core i5	10310U	4 (8)	1.7	4.4	UHD 620	1.15	6	10	15	25	DDR4-2666 LPDDR3-2133	$297
Core i5	10210U	4 (8)	1.6	4.2	UHD 620	1.10	6	10	15	25	DDR4-2666 LPDDR3-2133	$297
Core i3	10110U	2 (4)	2.1	4.1	UHD 620	1.00	4	10	15	25	DDR4-2666 LPDDR3-2133	$281

==== Comet Lake Refresh microarchitecture ====
Processor branding	Model	Cores (Threads)	CPU clock rate (GHz)			GPU		Smart cache (MB)	TDP		Memory support	Price (USD)
Processor branding	Model	Cores (Threads)	Base	All-Core Turbo	Turbo Boost 2.0	Model	Max. freq.	Smart cache (MB)	TDP		Memory support	Price (USD)
Processor branding	Model	Cores (Threads)	Base	All-Core Turbo	Turbo Boost 2.0	Model	Max. freq.	Smart cache (MB)	Down	Base	Memory support	Price (USD)
Core i5	10505	6 (12)	3.2	4.3	4.6	UHD 630	1.2	12	N/A	65	DDR4-2666 2-channel up to 128 GB	$192
Core i3	10325	4 (8)	3.9	4.5	4.7	UHD 630	1.15	8	—N/a	65	DDR4-2666 2-channel up to 128 GB	$154
Core i3	10305	4 (8)	3.8	4.3	4.5	UHD 630	1.15	8	—N/a	65	DDR4-2666 2-channel up to 128 GB	$143
Core i3	10305T	4 (8)	3.0	3.7	4.0	UHD 630	1.10	8	25	35	DDR4-2666 2-channel up to 128 GB	$143
Core i3	10105	4 (8)	3.7	4.2	4.4	UHD 630	1.10	6	—N/a	65	DDR4-2666 2-channel up to 128 GB	$122
Core i3	10105F	4 (8)	3.7	4.2	4.4	—N/a		6	—N/a	65	DDR4-2666 2-channel up to 128 GB	$97
Core i3	10105T	4 (8)	3.0	3.6	3.9	UHD 630	1.10	6	25	35	DDR4-2666 2-channel up to 128 GB	$122

==== Amber Lake Refresh microarchitecture ====
List of Amber Lake Refresh Y-series processors
Processor branding	Model	Cores (threads)	CPU clock rate	Turbo Boost clock rate			GPU	Max GPU clock rate	L3 cache	TDP	cTDP		Memory	Price
Processor branding	Model	Cores (threads)	CPU clock rate	1 core	2 cores	4 cores	GPU	Max GPU clock rate	L3 cache	TDP	Up	Down	Memory	Price
Core i7	10510Y	4 (8)	1.2 GHz	4.5 GHz		3.2 GHz	UHD for 10th Gen Processors	1150 MHz	8 MB	7 W	9 W	4.5 W	LPDDR3-2133	US$403
Core i5	10310Y	4 (8)	1.1 GHz	4.1 GHz		2.8 GHz	UHD for 10th Gen Processors	1050 MHz	6 MB	7 W	9 W	5.5 W	LPDDR3-2133	US$292
Core i5	10210Y	4 (8)	1.0 GHz	4.0 GHz		2.7 GHz	UHD for 10th Gen Processors	1050 MHz	6 MB	7 W	9 W	4.5 W	LPDDR3-2133	US$292
Core i3	10110Y	2 (4)	1.0 GHz	4.0 GHz	3.7 GHz	—N/a	UHD for 10th Gen Processors	1000 MHz	4 MB	7 W	9 W	5.5 W	LPDDR3-2133	US$287

=== 11th generation ===
==== Tiger Lake ====
Launched on September 2, 2020.

- All models support DDR4-3200 memory
- All models support 20 reconfigurable PCI Express 4.0 lanes, allowing x16 Gen 4 link for discrete GPU and x4 Gen 4 link for M.2 SSDs

===== Mobile processors (Tiger Lake-H) =====
Processor branding	Model	Cores (threads)	Base freq at TDP			Max Turbo freq, active cores				UHD Graphics		Smart cache	TDP	Price
Processor branding	Model	Cores (threads)	@35 W	@45 W	@65 W	1 or 2	4	6	All	EUs	Max freq	Smart cache	TDP	Price
Core i9	11980HK	8 (16)	—N/a	2.6 GHz	3.3 GHz	5.0 GHz	4.9 GHz	4.7 GHz	4.5 GHz	32	1.45 GHz	24 MB	45-65 W	$583
Core i9	11950H vPro	8 (16)	2.1 GHz	2.6 GHz	N/A	5.0 GHz	4.9 GHz	4.7 GHz	4.5 GHz	32	1.45 GHz	24 MB	35-45 W	$556
Core i9	11900H	8 (16)	2.1 GHz	2.5 GHz	N/A	4.9 GHz	4.8 GHz	4.6 GHz	4.4 GHz	32	1.45 GHz	24 MB	35-45 W	$546
Core i7	11850H vPro	8 (16)	2.1 GHz	2.5 GHz	N/A	4.8 GHz	4.8 GHz	4.6 GHz	4.3 GHz	32	1.45 GHz	24 MB	35-45 W	$395
Core i7	11800H	8 (16)	1.9 GHz	2.3 GHz	N/A	4.6 GHz	4.5 GHz	4.4 GHz	4.2 GHz	32	1.45 GHz	24 MB	35-45 W	$395
Core i5	11500H vPro	6 (12)	2.4 GHz	2.9 GHz	N/A	4.6 GHz	4.4 GHz	4.2 GHz		32	1.45 GHz	12 MB	35-45 W	$250
Core i5	11400H	6 (12)	2.2 GHz	2.7 GHz	N/A	4.5 GHz	4.3 GHz	4.1 GHz		16	1.45 GHz	12 MB	35-45 W	$250
Core i5	11260H	6 (12)	2.1 GHz	2.6 GHz	N/A	4.4 GHz	4.2 GHz	4.0 GHz		16	1.40 GHz	12 MB	35-45 W	$250

===== Mobile processors (Tiger Lake-H35) =====
- All models support DDR4-3200 or LPDDR4X-4267 memory

Processor branding	Model	Cores (threads)	Base freq at TDP		Max Turbo freq active cores			Iris Xe Graphics		Smart cache	TDP	Price
Processor branding	Model	Cores (threads)	@28 W	@35 W	1	2	All	EUs	Max freq	Smart cache	TDP	Price
Core i7	11390H	4 (8)	2.9 GHz	3.4 GHz	5.0 GHz		4.6 GHz	96	1.40 GHz	12 MB	28-35 W	$426
Core i7	11375H	4 (8)	3.0 GHz	3.3 GHz	5.0 GHz	4.8 GHz	4.3 GHz	96	1.35 GHz	12 MB	28-35 W	$482
Core i7	11370H	4 (8)	3.0 GHz	3.3 GHz	4.8 GHz		4.3 GHz	96	1.35 GHz	12 MB	28-35 W	$426
Core i5	11320H	4 (8)	2.5 GHz	3.2 GHz	4.5 GHz		4.3 GHz	96	1.35 GHz	8 MB	28-35 W	$309
Core i5	11300H	4 (8)	2.6 GHz	3.1 GHz	4.4 GHz		4.0 GHz	80	1.30 GHz	8 MB	28-35 W	$309

===== Mobile processors (UP3-class) =====
Processor branding	Model	Cores (threads)	Base freq at TDP			Max Turbo freq		GPU			Smart cache	TDP	Memory support	Price
Processor branding	Model	Cores (threads)	@12 W	@15 W	@28 W	1 Core	All Cores	Series	EUs	Max freq	Smart cache	TDP	Memory support	Price
Core i7	1195G7	4 (8)	1.3 GHz		2.9 GHz	5.0 GHz	4.6 GHz	Iris Xe	96	1.40 GHz	12 MB	12-28 W	DDR4-3200 LPDDR4X-4267	$426
Core i7	1185G7 vPro	4 (8)	1.2 GHz	1.8 GHz	3.0 GHz	4.8 GHz	4.3 GHz	Iris Xe	96	1.35 GHz	12 MB	12-28 W	DDR4-3200 LPDDR4X-4267	$426
Core i7	1165G7	4 (8)	1.2 GHz	1.7 GHz	2.8 GHz	4.7 GHz	4.1 GHz	Iris Xe	96	1.30 GHz	12 MB	12-28 W	DDR4-3200 LPDDR4X-4267	$426
Core i5	1155G7	4 (8)	1.0 GHz		2.5 GHz	4.5 GHz	4.3 GHz	Iris Xe	80	1.35 GHz	8 MB	12-28 W	DDR4-3200 LPDDR4X-4267	$309
Core i5	1145G7 vPro	4 (8)	1.1 GHz	1.5 GHz	2.6 GHz	4.4 GHz	3.8 GHz	Iris Xe	80	1.30 GHz	8 MB	12-28 W	DDR4-3200 LPDDR4X-4267	$309
Core i5	1135G7	4 (8)	0.9 GHz	1.4 GHz	2.4 GHz	4.2 GHz	3.8 GHz	Iris Xe	80	1.30 GHz	8 MB	12-28 W	DDR4-3200 LPDDR4X-4267	$309
Core i3	1125G4	4 (8)	0.9 GHz		2.0 GHz	3.7 GHz	3.3 GHz	UHD	48	1.25 GHz	8 MB	12-28 W	DDR4-3200 LPDDR4X-3733	$281
Core i3	1115G4	2 (4)	1.7 GHz	2.2 GHz	3.0 GHz	4.1 GHz		UHD	48	1.25 GHz	6 MB	12-28 W	DDR4-3200 LPDDR4X-3733	$281

Embedded mobile processors (UP3-class)
Processor branding	Model	Cores (threads)	Base freq at TDP			Max Turbo freq	GPU			Smart cache	TDP	Memory support		Price
Processor branding	Model	Cores (threads)	@12 W	@15 W	@28 W	Max Turbo freq	Series	EUs	Max freq	Smart cache	TDP	Type	ECC	Price
Core i7	1185GRE vPro	4 (8)	1.2 GHz	1.8 GHz	2.8 GHz	4.4 GHz	Iris Xe	96	1.35 GHz	12 MB	15 W	DDR4-3200 LPDDR4X-4267	Yes	$490
Core i7	1185G7E vPro	4 (8)	1.2 GHz	1.8 GHz	2.8 GHz	4.4 GHz	Iris Xe	96	1.35 GHz	12 MB	15 W	DDR4-3200 LPDDR4X-4267	No	$431
Core i5	1145GRE vPro	4 (8)	1.1 GHz	1.5 GHz	2.6 GHz	4.1 GHz	Iris Xe	80	1.30 GHz	8 MB	15 W	DDR4-3200 LPDDR4X-4267	Yes	$362
Core i5	1145G7E vPro	4 (8)	1.1 GHz	1.5 GHz	2.6 GHz	4.1 GHz	Iris Xe	80	1.30 GHz	8 MB	15 W	DDR4-3200 LPDDR4X-4267	No	$312
Core i3	1115GRE	2 (4)	1.7 GHz	2.2 GHz	3.0 GHz	3.9 GHz	UHD	48	1.25 GHz	6 MB	15 W	DDR4-3200 LPDDR4X-3733	Yes	$338
Core i3	1115G4E	2 (4)	1.7 GHz	2.2 GHz	3.0 GHz	3.9 GHz	UHD	48	1.25 GHz	6 MB	15 W	DDR4-3200 LPDDR4X-3733	No	$285

===== Mobile processors (UP4-class) =====
Processor branding	Model	Cores (threads)	Base freq at TDP			Max Turbo freq		GPU			Smart cache	TDP	Memory support	Price
Processor branding	Model	Cores (threads)	@7 W	@9 W	@15 W	1 Core	All Cores	Series	EUs	Max freq	Smart cache	TDP	Memory support	Price
Core i7	1180G7 vPro	4 (8)	0.9 GHz		2.2 GHz	4.6 GHz		Iris Xe	96	1.10 GHz	12 MB	7-15 W	LPDDR4X-4267	$426
Core i7	1160G7	4 (8)	0.9 GHz	1.2 GHz	2.1 GHz	4.4 GHz	3.6 GHz	Iris Xe	96	1.10 GHz	12 MB	7-15 W	LPDDR4X-4267	$426
Core i5	1140G7 vPro	4 (8)	0.8 GHz		1.8 GHz	4.2 GHz		Iris Xe	80	1.10 GHz	8 MB	7-15 W	LPDDR4X-4267	$309
Core i5	1130G7	4 (8)	0.8 GHz	1.1 GHz	1.8 GHz	4.0 GHz	3.4 GHz	Iris Xe	80	1.10 GHz	8 MB	7-15 W	LPDDR4X-4267	$309
Core i3	1120G4	4 (8)	0.8 GHz	1.1 GHz	1.5 GHz	3.5 GHz	3.0 GHz	UHD	48	1.10 GHz	8 MB	7-15 W	LPDDR4X-4267	$281
Core i3	1110G4	2 (4)	1.5 GHz	1.8 GHz	2.5 GHz	3.9 GHz		UHD	48	1.10 GHz	6 MB	7-15 W	LPDDR4X-4267	$281

===== Desktop/tablet processors (Tiger Lake-B) =====
- Socket: FCBGA1787, a BGA socket, thus these CPUs are meant only for system integrators
- Intel Xe UHD Graphics
- Up to 128 GB DDR4-3200 memory
- Was initially incorrectly listed as having a 5.3 GHz TVB boost frequency.

Processor branding	Model	Cores (threads)	Base / Boost Clocks (GHz)	L3 cache (MB)	TDP	GPU EU	GPU Max freq	Price
Core i9	11900 KB	8 (16)	3.3 / 4.9	24	65 W	32	1.45 GHz	$539
Core i7	11700B	8 (16)	3.2 / 4.8	24	65 W	32	1.45 GHz	
Core i5	11500B	6 (12)	3.3 / 4.6	12	65 W	32	1.45 GHz	
Core i3	11100B	4 (8)	3.6 / 4.4	12	65 W	16	1.4 GHz	

==== Rocket Lake microarchitecture ====
Rocket Lake is a codename for Intel's desktop x86 chip family based on the new Cypress Cove microarchitecture, a variant of Sunny Cove (used by Intel's Ice Lake mobile processors) backported to the older 14 nm process. The chips are marketed as "Intel 11th generation Core". Launched March 30, 2021.

===== Desktop processors =====
- All CPUs listed below support DDR4-3200 natively. The Core i9 K/KF processors enable a 1:1 ratio of DRAM to memory controller by default at DDR4-3200, whereas the Core i9 non K/KF and all other CPUs listed below enable a 2:1 ratio of DRAM to memory controller by default at DDR4-3200 and a 1:1 ratio by default at DDR4-2933.
- All CPUs support up to 128 GiB of RAM in dual channel mode
- Core i9 CPUs (except 11900T) support Intel Thermal Velocity Boost technology

Processor branding	Model	Cores (Threads)	Base clock rate	All-Core Turbo	Turbo Boost 2.0	Turbo Boost Max 3.0	GPU	max GPU clock rate	Smart cache	TDP	Price (USD)
Core i9	11900K	8 (16)	3.5 GHz	4.8 GHz	5.1 GHz	5.2 GHz	UHD 750	1.3 GHz	16 MiB	125 W	$539
Core i9	11900KF	8 (16)	3.5 GHz	4.8 GHz	5.1 GHz	5.2 GHz	-		16 MiB	125 W	$513
Core i9	11900	8 (16)	2.5 GHz	4.7 GHz	5.0 GHz	5.1 GHz	UHD 750	1.3 GHz	16 MiB	65 W	$439
Core i9	11900F	8 (16)	2.5 GHz	4.7 GHz	5.0 GHz	5.1 GHz	-		16 MiB	65 W	$422
Core i9	11900T	8 (16)	1.5 GHz	3.7 GHz	4.8 GHz	4.9 GHz	UHD 750	1.3 GHz	16 MiB	35 W	$439
Core i7	11700K	8 (16)	3.6 GHz	4.6 GHz	4.9 GHz	5.0 GHz	UHD 750	1.3 GHz	16 MiB	125W	$399
Core i7	11700KF	8 (16)	3.6 GHz	4.6 GHz	4.9 GHz	5.0 GHz	-		16 MiB	125W	$374
Core i7	11700	8 (16)	2.5 GHz	4.4 GHz	4.8 GHz	4.9 GHz	UHD 750	1.3 GHz	16 MiB	65W	$323
Core i7	11700F	8 (16)	2.5 GHz	4.4 GHz	4.8 GHz	4.9 GHz	-		16 MiB	65W	$298
Core i7	11700T	8 (16)	1.4 GHz	3.6 GHz	4.5 GHz	4.6 GHz	UHD 750	1.3 GHz	16 MiB	35 W	$323
Core i5	11600K	6 (12)	3.9 GHz	4.6 GHz	4.9 GHz	N/A	UHD 750	1.3 GHz	12 MiB	125 W	$262
Core i5	11600KF	6 (12)	3.9 GHz	4.6 GHz	4.9 GHz	N/A	-		12 MiB	125 W	$237
Core i5	11600	6 (12)	2.8 GHz	4.3 GHz	4.8 GHz	N/A	UHD 750	1.3 GHz	12 MiB	65 W	$213
Core i5	11600T	6 (12)	1.7 GHz	3.5 GHz	4.1 GHz	N/A	UHD 750	1.3 GHz	12 MiB	35 W	$213
Core i5	11500	6 (12)	2.7 GHz	4.2 GHz	4.6 GHz	N/A	UHD 750	1.3 GHz	12 MiB	65 W	$192
Core i5	11500T	6 (12)	1.5 GHz	3.4 GHz	3.9 GHz	N/A	UHD 750	1.2 GHz	12 MiB	35 W	$192
Core i5	11400	6 (12)	2.6 GHz	4.2 GHz	4.4 GHz	N/A	UHD 730	1.3 GHz	12 MiB	65 W	$182
Core i5	11400F	6 (12)	2.6 GHz	4.2 GHz	4.4 GHz	N/A	-		12 MiB	65 W	$157
Core i5	11400T	6 (12)	1.3 GHz	3.3 GHz	3.7 GHz	N/A	UHD 730	1.2 GHz	12 MiB	35 W	$182

=== 12th generation ===
==== Alder Lake ====
Alder Lake is Intel's codename for the 12th generation of Intel Core processors based on a hybrid architecture utilizing Golden Cove high-performance cores and Gracemont power-efficient cores.
It is fabricated using Intel's Intel 7 process, previously referred to as Intel 10 nm Enhanced SuperFin (10ESF).
Intel officially announced 12th Gen Intel Core CPUs on October 27, 2021, and was launched to the market on November 4, 2021.

===== Desktop processors (Alder Lake-S) =====
- All the CPUs support up to 128 GB of DDR4-3200 or DDR5-4800 RAM in dual channel mode.
- Some models feature integrated UHD Graphics 770, UHD Graphics 730 or UHD Graphics 710 GPU with 32/24/16 EUs and base frequency of 300 MHz.
- By default Alder Lake CPUs are configured to run at Turbo Power at all times and Base Power is only guaranteed when P-Cores/E-cores do not exceed the base clock rate.
- Max Turbo Power: the maximum sustained (> 1 s) power dissipation of the processor as limited by current and/or temperature controls. Instantaneous power may exceed Maximum Turbo Power for short durations (≤ 10 ms). Maximum Turbo Power is configurable by system vendor and can be system specific.
- CPUs in **bold** below feature UDIMM ECC memory support only when paired with a motherboard based on the W680 chipset.

*By default, Core i9 12900KS achieves 5.5 GHz only when using Thermal Velocity Boost

Processor branding	Model	Cores (threads)		Base clock rate		Turbo Boost 2.0		Turbo Max 3.0	GPU		Smart cache	Power		Price (USD)
Processor branding	Model	P	E	P	E	P	E	P	Model	Max. clock rate	Smart cache	Base	Turbo	Price (USD)
Core i9	**12900KS**	8 (16)	8 (8)	3.4 GHz	2.5 GHz	5.2 GHz	4.0 GHz	5.3 GHz	UHD 770	1.55 GHz	30 MB	150 W	241 W	$739
Core i9	**12900K**	8 (16)	8 (8)	3.2 GHz	2.4 GHz	5.1 GHz	3.9 GHz	5.2 GHz	UHD 770	1.55 GHz	30 MB	125 W	241 W	$589
Core i9	12900KF	8 (16)	8 (8)	3.2 GHz	2.4 GHz	5.1 GHz	3.9 GHz	5.2 GHz	—N/a		30 MB	125 W	241 W	$564
Core i9	**12900**	8 (16)	8 (8)	2.4 GHz	1.8 GHz	5.0 GHz	3.8 GHz	5.1 GHz	UHD 770	1.55 GHz	30 MB	65 W	202 W	$489
Core i9	12900F	8 (16)	8 (8)	2.4 GHz	1.8 GHz	5.0 GHz	3.8 GHz	5.1 GHz	—N/a		30 MB	65 W	202 W	$464
Core i9	**12900T**	8 (16)	8 (8)	1.4 GHz	1.0 GHz	4.8 GHz	3.6 GHz	4.9 GHz	UHD 770	1.55 GHz	30 MB	35 W	106 W	$489
Core i7	**12700K**	8 (16)	4 (4)	3.6 GHz	2.7 GHz	4.9 GHz	3.8 GHz	5.0 GHz	UHD 770	1.50 GHz	25 MB	125 W	190 W	$409
Core i7	12700KF	8 (16)	4 (4)	3.6 GHz	2.7 GHz	4.9 GHz	3.8 GHz	5.0 GHz	—N/a		25 MB	125 W	190 W	$384
Core i7	**12700**	8 (16)	4 (4)	2.1 GHz	1.6 GHz	4.8 GHz	3.6 GHz	4.9 GHz	UHD 770	1.50 GHz	25 MB	65 W	180 W	$339
Core i7	12700F	8 (16)	4 (4)	2.1 GHz	1.6 GHz	4.8 GHz	3.6 GHz	4.9 GHz	—N/a		25 MB	65 W	180 W	$314
Core i7	**12700T**	8 (16)	4 (4)	1.4 GHz	1.0 GHz	4.6 GHz	3.4 GHz	4.7 GHz	UHD 770	1.50 GHz	25 MB	35 W	99 W	$339
Core i5	**12600K**	6 (12)	4 (4)	3.7 GHz	2.8 GHz	4.9 GHz	3.6 GHz	—N/a	UHD 770	1.45 GHz	20 MB	125 W	150 W	$289
Core i5	12600KF	6 (12)	4 (4)	3.7 GHz	2.8 GHz	4.9 GHz	3.6 GHz	—N/a	—N/a		20 MB	125 W	150 W	$264
Core i5	**12600**	6 (12)	—N/a	3.3 GHz	—N/a	4.8 GHz	—N/a		UHD 770	1.45 GHz	18 MB	65 W	117 W	$223
Core i5	**12600T**	6 (12)	—N/a	2.1 GHz	—N/a	4.6 GHz	—N/a		UHD 770	1.45 GHz	18 MB	35 W	74 W	$223
Core i5	**12500**	6 (12)	—N/a	3.0 GHz	—N/a	4.6 GHz	—N/a		UHD 770	1.45 GHz	18 MB	65 W	117 W	$202
Core i5	**12500T**	6 (12)	—N/a	2.0 GHz	—N/a	4.4 GHz	—N/a		UHD 770	1.45 GHz	18 MB	35 W	74 W	$202
Core i5	12490F	6 (12)	—N/a	3.0 GHz	—N/a	4.6 GHz	—N/a		—N/a		20 MB	65 W	117 W	China exclusive
Core i5	12400	6 (12)	—N/a	2.5 GHz	—N/a	4.4 GHz	—N/a		UHD 730	1.45 GHz	18 MB	65 W	117 W	$192
Core i5	12400F	6 (12)	—N/a	2.5 GHz	—N/a	4.4 GHz	—N/a		—N/a		18 MB	65 W	117 W	$167
Core i5	12400T	6 (12)	—N/a	1.8 GHz	—N/a	4.2 GHz	—N/a		UHD 730	1.45 GHz	18 MB	35 W	74 W	$192
Core i3	12300	4 (8)	—N/a	3.5 GHz	—N/a	4.4 GHz	—N/a		UHD 730	1.45 GHz	12 MB	60 W	89 W	$143
Core i3	12300T	4 (8)	—N/a	2.3 GHz	—N/a	4.2 GHz	—N/a		UHD 730	1.45 GHz	12 MB	35 W	69 W	$143
Core i3	12100	4 (8)	—N/a	3.3 GHz	—N/a	4.3 GHz	—N/a		UHD 730	1.40 GHz	12 MB	60 W	89 W	$122
Core i3	12100F	4 (8)	—N/a	3.3 GHz	—N/a	4.3 GHz	—N/a		—N/a		12 MB	58 W	89 W	$97
Core i3	12100T	4 (8)	—N/a	2.2 GHz	—N/a	4.1 GHz	—N/a		UHD 730	1.40 GHz	12 MB	35 W	69 W	$122

===== Extreme-performance Mobile Processors (Alder Lake-HX) =====
- **Bold** indicates ECC memory support

Processor branding	Model	Cores (threads)		Base clock rate		Turbo Boost 2.0		UHD Graphics		Smart cache	Power		Price (USD)
Processor branding	Model	P	E	P	E	P	E	EUs	Max. freq.	Smart cache	Base	Turbo	Price (USD)
Core i9	**12950HX**	8 (16)	8 (8)	2.3 GHz	1.7 GHz	5.0 GHz	3.6 GHz	32	1.55 GHz	30 MB	55 W	157 W	$590
Core i9	12900HX	8 (16)	8 (8)	2.3 GHz	1.7 GHz	5.0 GHz	3.6 GHz	32	1.55 GHz	30 MB	55 W	157 W	$606
Core i7	**12850HX**	8 (16)	8 (8)	2.1 GHz	1.5 GHz	4.8 GHz	3.4 GHz	32	1.45 GHz	25 MB	55 W	157 W	$428
Core i7	12800HX	8 (16)	8 (8)	2.0 GHz	1.5 GHz	4.8 GHz	3.4 GHz	32	1.45 GHz	25 MB	55 W	157 W	$457
Core i7	12650HX	6 (12)	8 (8)	2.0 GHz	1.5 GHz	4.7 GHz	3.3 GHz	32	1.45 GHz	24 MB	55 W	157 W	
Core i5	**12600HX**	4 (8)	8 (8)	2.5 GHz	1.8 GHz	4.6 GHz	3.3 GHz	32	1.35 GHz	18 MB	55 W	157 W	$284
Core i5	12450HX	4 (8)	4 (4)	2.4 GHz	1.8 GHz	4.4 GHz	3.1 GHz	16	1.30 GHz	12 MB	55 W	157 W	

===== High-performance Mobile Processors (Alder Lake-H) =====
Processor branding	Model	Cores (threads)		Base clock rate		Turbo Boost 2.0		Iris Xe Graphics		Smart cache	Base Power	Turbo power	Price (USD)
Processor branding	Model	P-cores	E-cores	P-cores	E-cores	P-cores	E-cores	EUs	Max freq	Smart cache	Base Power	Turbo power	Price (USD)
Core i9	12900HK	6 (12)	8 (8)	2.5 GHz	1.8 GHz	5.0 GHz	3.8 GHz	96	1.45 GHz	24 MB	45 W	115 W	$635
Core i9	12900H	6 (12)	8 (8)	2.5 GHz	1.8 GHz	5.0 GHz	3.8 GHz	96	1.45 GHz	24 MB	45 W	115 W	$617
Core i7	12800H	6 (12)	8 (8)	2.4 GHz	1.8 GHz	4.8 GHz	3.7 GHz	96	1.4 GHz	24 MB	45 W	115 W	$457
Core i7	12700H	6 (12)	8 (8)	2.3 GHz	1.7 GHz	4.7 GHz	3.5 GHz	96	1.4 GHz	24 MB	45 W	115 W	$457
Core i7	12650H	6 (12)	4 (4)	2.3 GHz	1.7 GHz	4.7 GHz	3.5 GHz	64	1.4 GHz	24 MB	45 W	115 W	$457
Core i5	12600H	4 (8)	8 (8)	2.7 GHz	2.0 GHz	4.5 GHz	3.3 GHz	80	1.4 GHz	18 MB	45 W	95 W	$311
Core i5	12500H	4 (8)	8 (8)	2.5 GHz	1.8 GHz	4.5 GHz	3.3 GHz	80	1.3 GHz	18 MB	45 W	95 W	$311
Core i5	12450H	4 (8)	4 (4)	2.0 GHz	1.5 GHz	4.4 GHz	3.3 GHz	48	1.2 GHz	12 MB	45 W	95 W	$311

===== Low Power Performance Mobile Processors (Alder Lake-P) =====
Processor branding	Model	Cores (threads)		Base clock rate		Turbo Boost 2.0		Iris Xe Graphics		Smart cache	Base Power	Turbo power	Price (USD)
Processor branding	Model	P-cores	E-cores	P-cores	E-cores	P-cores	E-cores	EUs	Max freq	Smart cache	Base Power	Turbo power	Price (USD)
Core i7	1280P	6 (12)	8 (8)	1.8 GHz	1.3 GHz	4.8 GHz	3.6 GHz	96	1.45 GHz	24 MB	28 W	64 W	$482
Core i7	1270P	4 (8)	8 (8)	2.2 GHz	1.6 GHz	4.8 GHz	3.5 GHz	96	1.40 GHz	18 MB	28 W	64 W	$438
Core i7	1260P	4 (8)	8 (8)	2.1 GHz	1.5 GHz	4.7 GHz	3.4 GHz	96	1.40 GHz	18 MB	28 W	64 W	$438
Core i5	1250P	4 (8)	8 (8)	1.7 GHz	1.2 GHz	4.4 GHz	3.3 GHz	80	1.40 GHz	12 MB	28 W	64 W	$320
Core i5	1240P	4 (8)	8 (8)	1.7 GHz	1.2 GHz	4.4 GHz	3.3 GHz	80	1.30 GHz	12 MB	28 W	64 W	$320
Core i3	1220P	2 (4)	8 (8)	1.5 GHz	1.1 GHz	4.4 GHz	3.3 GHz	64	1.10 GHz	12 MB	28 W	64 W	$281

===== Ultra Low Power Mobile Processors (Alder Lake-U) =====
Processor branding	Model	Cores (threads)		Base clock rate		Turbo Boost 2.0		Iris Xe Graphics		Smart cache	Base power	Turbo power	Price (USD)
Processor branding	Model	P-cores	E-cores	P-cores	E-cores	P-cores	E-cores	EUs	Max freq	Smart cache	Base power	Turbo power	Price (USD)
Core i7	1265U	2 (4)	8 (8)	1.8 GHz	1.3 GHz	4.8 GHz	3.6 GHz	96	1.25 GHz	12 MB	15 W	55 W	$426
Core i7	1260U	2 (4)	8 (8)	1.1 GHz	0.8 GHz	4.7 GHz	3.5 GHz	96	0.9 GHz	12 MB	9 W	29 W	
Core i7	1255U	2 (4)	8 (8)	1.7 GHz	1.2 GHz	4.7 GHz	3.5 GHz	96	1.25 GHz	12 MB	15 W	55 W	$426
Core i7	1250U	2 (4)	8 (8)	1.1 GHz	0.8 GHz	4.7 GHz	3.5 GHz	96	0.9 GHz	12 MB	9 W	29 W	
Core i5	1245U	2 (4)	8 (8)	1.6 GHz	1.2 GHz	4.4 GHz	3.3 GHz	80	1.2 GHz	12 MB	15 W	55 W	$309
Core i5	1240U	2 (4)	8 (8)	1.1 GHz	0.8 GHz	4.4 GHz	3.3 GHz	80	0.9 GHz	12 MB	9 W	29 W	
Core i5	1235U	2 (4)	8 (8)	1.3 GHz	0.9 GHz	4.4 GHz	3.3 GHz	80	1.2 GHz	12 MB	15 W	55 W	$309
Core i5	1230U	2 (4)	8 (8)	1.0 GHz	0.7 GHz	4.4 GHz	3.3 GHz	80	0.9 GHz	12 MB	9 W	29 W	
Core i3	1215U	2 (4)	4 (4)	1.2 GHz	1.2 GHz	4.4 GHz	3.3 GHz	64	1.1 GHz	10 MB	15 W	55 W	$281
Core i3	1210U	2 (4)	4 (4)	1.0 GHz	0.7 GHz	4.4 GHz	3.3 GHz	64	0.85 GHz	10 MB	9 W	29 W	

Era of Core Ultra

=== 13th generation ===
==== Raptor Lake ====
Raptor Lake is Intel's codename for the 13th generation of Intel Core processors and the second generation based on a hybrid architecture.
It is fabricated using an improved version of Intel's Intel 7 process. Intel launched Raptor Lake on October 22, 2022.

===== Desktop Processors (Raptor Lake-S) =====
- All CPUs support up to DDR5 4800 and 192 GiB of RAM
  - 13600 and better support DDR5 5600
  - 13500 and lower support DDR5 4800
- Intel 600 and 700 chipset support with LGA 1700
  - Intel 600 Series chipsets require BIOS update to achieve support for Raptor Lake-S
- First 6 GHz processor (13900KS)*

*By default, Core i9 13900KS achieves 6.0 GHz only when using Thermal Velocity Boost with sufficient power and cooling.

Processor branding	Model	Cores (Threads)		Base clock rate		Turbo Boost 2.0		Turbo Boost 3.0	Iris Xe Graphics		Smart cache	Power		Price (USD)
Processor branding	Model	P-core	E-core	P-core	E-core	P-core	E-core	P-core	EUs	Max freq	Smart cache	Base	Turbo	Price (USD)
Core i9	13900KS	8 (16)	16 (16)	3.2 GHz	2.4 GHz	5.4 GHz	4.3 GHz	5.8 GHz	32	1.65 GHz	36 MB	150 W	253 W	$689
Core i9	13900K	8 (16)	16 (16)	3.0 GHz	2.2 GHz	5.4 GHz	4.3 GHz	5.7 GHz	32	1.65 GHz	36 MB	125 W	253 W	$589
Core i9	13900KF	8 (16)	16 (16)	3.0 GHz	2.2 GHz	5.4 GHz	4.3 GHz	5.7 GHz	—N/a		36 MB	125 W	253 W	$564
Core i9	13900	8 (16)	16 (16)	2.0 GHz	1.5 GHz	5.2 GHz	4.2 GHz	5.5 GHz	32	1.65 GHz	36 MB	65 W	219 W	$549
Core i9	13900F	8 (16)	16 (16)	2.0 GHz	1.5 GHz	5.2 GHz	4.2 GHz	5.5 GHz	—N/a		36 MB	65 W	219 W	$524
Core i9	13900T	8 (16)	16 (16)	1.1 GHz	0.8 GHz	5.1 GHz	3.9 GHz	5.3 GHz	32	1.65 GHz	36 MB	35 W	106 W	$549
Core i7	13700K	8 (16)	8 (8)	3.4 GHz	2.5 GHz	5.3 GHz	4.2 GHz	5.4 GHz	32	1.60 GHz	30 MB	125 W	253 W	$409
Core i7	13700KF	8 (16)	8 (8)	3.4 GHz	2.5 GHz	5.3 GHz	4.2 GHz	5.4 GHz	—N/a		30 MB	125 W	253 W	$384
Core i7	13700	8 (16)	8 (8)	2.1 GHz	1.5 GHz	5.1 GHz	4.1 GHz	5.2 GHz	32	1.60 GHz	30 MB	65 W	219 W	$384
Core i7	13700F	8 (16)	8 (8)	2.1 GHz	1.5 GHz	5.1 GHz	4.1 GHz	5.2 GHz	—N/a		30 MB	65 W	219 W	$359
Core i7	13700T	8 (16)	8 (8)	1.4 GHz	1.0 GHz	4.8 GHz	3.6 GHz	4.9 GHz	32	1.60 GHz	30 MB	35 W	106 W	$384
Core i5	13600K	6 (12)	8 (8)	3.5 GHz	2.6 GHz	5.1 GHz	3.9 GHz	—N/a	32	1.50 GHz	24 MB	125 W	181 W	$319
Core i5	13600KF	6 (12)	8 (8)	3.5 GHz	2.6 GHz	5.1 GHz	3.9 GHz	—N/a	—N/a		24 MB	125 W	181 W	$294
Core i5	13600	6 (12)	8 (8)	2.7 GHz	2.0 GHz	5.0 GHz	3.7 GHz	—N/a	32	1.55 GHz	24 MB	65 W	154 W	$255
Core i5	13600T	6 (12)	8 (8)	1.8 GHz	1.3 GHz	4.8 GHz	3.4 GHz	—N/a	32	1.55 GHz	24 MB	35 W	92 W	$255
Core i5	13500	6 (12)	8 (8)	2.5 GHz	1.8 GHz	4.8 GHz	3.5 GHz	—N/a	32	1.55 GHz	24 MB	65 W	154 W	$232
Core i5	13500T	6 (12)	8 (8)	1.6 GHz	1.2 GHz	4.6 GHz	3.2 GHz	—N/a	32	1.55 GHz	24 MB	35 W	92 W	$232
Core i5	13400	6 (12)	4 (4)	2.5 GHz	1.8 GHz	4.6 GHz	3.3 GHz	—N/a	24	1.55 GHz	20 MB	65 W	148 W	$221
Core i5	13400F	6 (12)	4 (4)	2.5 GHz	1.8 GHz	4.6 GHz	3.3 GHz	—N/a	—N/a		20 MB	65 W	148 W	$196
Core i5	13400T	6 (12)	4 (4)	1.3 GHz	1.0 GHz	4.4 GHz	3.0 GHz	—N/a	24	1.55 GHz	20 MB	35 W	82 W	$221
Core i3	13100	4 (8)	—N/a	3.4 GHz	—N/a	4.5 GHz	—N/a	—N/a	24	1.50 GHz	12 MB	60 W	89 W	$134
Core i3	13100F	4 (8)	—N/a	3.4 GHz	—N/a	4.5 GHz	—N/a	—N/a	—N/a		12 MB	58 W	89 W	$109
Core i3	13100T	4 (8)	—N/a	2.5 GHz	—N/a	4.2 GHz	—N/a	—N/a	24	1.50 GHz	12 MB	35 W	69 W	$134

=== 14th generation ===
==== Raptor Lake Refresh ====
Raptor Lake Refresh is Intel's codename for the 14th generation of Intel Core processors. It is a refresh and based on the same architecture of the 13th generation with clock speeds of up to 6.2 GHz on the Core i9 14900KS, 6 GHz on the Core i9 14900K and 14900KF, 5.6 GHz on the Core i7 14700K and 14700KF, and 5.3 GHz on the Core i5 14600K and 14600KF as well as UHD Graphics 770 on non-F processors. They are still based on the Intel 7 process node. Introduced on October 17, 2023, these CPUs are designed for the LGA 1700 socket, which allows for compatibility with 600 and 700 series motherboards. It is the last generation CPUs to use the Intel Core i3, i5, i7 and i9 naming scheme as Intel announced that they will be dropping the "i" prefix for future Intel Core processors in 2023.

The 14th generation CPU does not feature any major architectural changes over Raptor Lake, but does feature some minor improvements. The 14th generation CPU was widely criticized as a last-ditch effort to beat AMD's Zen 4 with 3D V-Cache Intel's desktop version of the next generation architecture, Meteor Lake, was cancelled and the Arrow Lake architecture was not yet ready for release.

In addition to the Raptor Lake-S Refresh desktop processors, Intel also launched 14th gen Raptor Lake-HX Refresh mobile processors in January 2024.

CPUs in bold below feature UDIMM ECC memory support only when paired with a motherboard based on the W680 chipset according to each respective Intel Ark product page.

Branding	Model	Cores (threads)		Clock rate (GHz)						GPU		Smart cache	TDP		Released	Price (USD) (Note: Price is Recommended Customer Price (RCP) at launch. RCP is the trade price that processors are sold by Intel to retailers and OEMs. Actual MSRP for consumers is higher)
Branding	Model	Cores (threads)		Base		Turbo Boost				Model	Max. freq. (GHz)	Smart cache	TDP		Released	Price (USD)
Branding	Model	Cores (threads)		Base		2.0		3.0	TVB	Model	Max. freq. (GHz)	Smart cache	TDP		Released	Price (USD)
Branding	Model	P	E	P	E	P	E	P	P	Model	Max. freq. (GHz)	Smart cache	Base	Turbo	Released	Price (USD)
Core i9	**14900KS**	8 (16)	16 (16)	3.2	2.4	5.6	4.5	5.9	6.2	UHD 770	1.65	36 MB	150 W	253 W	Mar 14, 2024	$689
Core i9	**14900K**	8 (16)	16 (16)	3.2	2.4	5.6	4.4	5.8	6.0	UHD 770	1.65	36 MB	125 W	253 W	Oct 17, 2023	$589
Core i9	14900KF	8 (16)	16 (16)	3.2	2.4	5.6	4.4	5.8	6.0	—N/a		36 MB	125 W	253 W	Oct 17, 2023	$564
Core i9	**14900**	8 (16)	16 (16)	2.0	1.5	5.4	4.3	5.6	5.8	UHD 770	1.65	36 MB	65 W	219 W	Jan 8, 2024	$549
Core i9	14900F	8 (16)	16 (16)	2.0	1.5	5.4	4.3	5.6	5.8	—N/a		36 MB	65 W	219 W	Jan 8, 2024	$524
Core i9	**14900T**	8 (16)	16 (16)	1.1	0.8	5.1	4.0	5.5	—N/a	UHD 770	1.65	36 MB	35 W	106 W	Jan 8, 2024	$549
Core i7	14790F	8 (16)	8 (8)	2.1	1.5	5.3	4.2	5.4	—N/a	—N/a		36 MB	65 W	219 W	Jan 15, 2024	China exclusive
Core i7	**14700K**	8 (16)	12 (12)	3.4	2.5	5.5	4.3	5.6	—N/a	UHD 770	1.6	33 MB	125 W	253 W	Oct 17, 2023	$409
Core i7	14700KF	8 (16)	12 (12)	3.4	2.5	5.5	4.3	5.6	—N/a	—N/a		33 MB	125 W	253 W	Oct 17, 2023	$384
Core i7	**14700**	8 (16)	12 (12)	2.1	1.5	5.3	4.2	5.4	—N/a	UHD 770	1.6	33 MB	65 W	219 W	Jan 8, 2024	$384
Core i7	14700F	8 (16)	12 (12)	2.1	1.5	5.3	4.2	5.4	—N/a	—N/a		33 MB	65 W	219 W	Jan 8, 2024	$359
Core i7	**14700T**	8 (16)	12 (12)	1.3	0.9	5.0	3.7	5.2	—N/a	UHD 770	1.6	33 MB	35 W	106 W	Jan 8, 2024	$384
Core i5	**14600K**	6 (12)	8 (8)	3.5	2.6	5.3	4.0	—N/a	—N/a	UHD 770	1.55	24 MB	125 W	181 W	Oct 17, 2023	$319
Core i5	14600KF	6 (12)	8 (8)	3.5	2.6	5.3	4.0	—N/a	—N/a	—N/a		24 MB	125 W	181 W	Oct 17, 2023	$294
Core i5	**14600**	6 (12)	8 (8)	2.7	2.0	5.2	3.9	—N/a	—N/a	UHD 770	1.55	24 MB	65 W	154 W	Jan 8, 2024	$255
Core i5	**14600T**	6 (12)	8 (8)	1.8	1.3	5.1	3.6	—N/a	—N/a	UHD 770	1.55	24 MB	35 W	92 W	Jan 8, 2024	$255
Core i5	**14500**	6 (12)	8 (8)	2.6	1.9	5.0	3.7	—N/a	—N/a	UHD 770	1.55	24 MB	65 W	154 W	Jan 8, 2024	$232
Core i5	**14500T**	6 (12)	8 (8)	1.7	1.2	4.8	3.4	—N/a	—N/a	UHD 770	1.55	24 MB	35 W	92 W	Jan 8, 2024	$232
Core i5	14490F	6 (12)	4 (4)	2.8	2.1	4.9	3.7	—N/a	—N/a	—N/a		24 MB	65 W	148 W	Jan 15, 2024	China exclusive
Core i5	14400	6 (12)	4 (4)	2.5	1.8	4.7	3.5	—N/a	—N/a	UHD 730	1.55	20 MB	65 W	148 W	Jan 8, 2024	$221
Core i5	14400F	6 (12)	4 (4)	2.5	1.8	4.7	3.5	—N/a	—N/a	—N/a		20 MB	65 W	148 W	Jan 8, 2024	$196
Core i5	14400T	6 (12)	4 (4)	1.5	1.1	4.5	3.2	—N/a	—N/a	UHD 730	1.55	20 MB	35 W	82 W	Jan 8, 2024	$221
Core i3	14100	4 (8)	—N/a	3.5	—N/a	4.7	—N/a	—N/a	—N/a	UHD 730	1.5	12 MB	60 W	110 W	Jan 8, 2024	$134
Core i3	14100F	4 (8)	—N/a	3.5	—N/a	4.7	—N/a	—N/a	—N/a	—N/a		12 MB	58 W	110 W	Jan 8, 2024	$109
Core i3	14100T	4 (8)	—N/a	2.7	—N/a	4.4	—N/a	—N/a	—N/a	UHD 730	1.5	12 MB	35 W	69 W	Jan 8, 2024	$134
Intel; Processor	300	2 (4)	—N/a	3.9	—N/a	—N/a	—N/a	—N/a	—N/a	UHD 710	1.45	6 MB	46 W	—N/a	Jan 8, 2024	$82
Intel; Processor	300T	2 (4)	—N/a	3.4	—N/a	—N/a	—N/a	—N/a	—N/a	UHD 710	1.45	6 MB	35 W	—N/a	Jan 8, 2024	$82

== Core and Core Ultra 3/5/7/9 series ==
Starting with the Meteor Lake mobile series launched in December 2023 (with the exception of Raptor Lake-HX Refresh), Intel introduced a new naming system for its new and upcoming processors. The numbers 3, 5, 7 and 9 which denote tiers are still used, but the letter 'i' is dropped, and there is a new "Core Ultra" sub-brand. Like AMD with their Ryzen 7000 mobile series and later processors, Intel now refreshes older architectures to be sold as more affordable mainstream processors while the latest architectures are released as "premium" products, under the Core Ultra brand.

This new naming system also cuts the number of model number digits down from 4-5 to 3-4, e.g. Core 1xx series instead of Core 8xxx or 14xxx series.

Intel no longer refers to iterations of product series under "nth generation" anymore, instead using "Series n". Otherwise the latest series launched in December 2023 would be called 15th generation.

Compared to the Core processors, the Core Ultra processors introduced more advanced AI technologies such as NPU.

=== Series 1 ===
The Series 1 of Core processors consists of the Raptor Lake-U Refresh mobile series released January 2024 under the Core brand, and the Meteor Lake-U/H mobile series released December 2023 under the Core Ultra brand.

Overview of mobile Core Series 1 models
Model line	Codename	Architecture	P-core count	E-core count	Integrated graphics
Core Ultra 5/7/9 1xxH	Meteor Lake-H	Redwood Cove (P-cores); Crestmont (E- and LP E-cores)	4–6	8	Arc (Alchemist), up to 8 Xe-cores
Core Ultra 5/7 1xxU	Meteor Lake-U	Redwood Cove (P-cores); Crestmont (E- and LP E-cores)	2	4–8	Intel Graphics (Alchemist), up to 4 Xe-cores
Core 3/5/7 1xxU	Raptor Lake-U Refresh	Raptor Cove (P-cores); Gracemont (E-cores)	2	4–8	Intel Graphics (Xe-LP), up to 96 EU

==== Meteor Lake ====
Meteor Lake is Intel's codename for the first generation of Intel Core Ultra mobile processors, and was officially launched on December 14, 2023. It is the first generation of Intel mobile processors to use a chiplet architecture which means that the processor is a multi-chip module. Tim Wilson led the system on a chip development for this generation microprocessor.

===== Process technology =====
Due to its Multi-Chip Module (MCM) construction, Meteor Lake can take advantage of different process nodes that are best suited to the use case. Meteor Lake is built using four different fabrication nodes, including both Intel's own nodes and external nodes outsourced to fabrication competitor TSMC. The "Intel 4" process used for the CPU tile is the first process node in which Intel is utilising extreme ultraviolet (EUV) lithography, which is necessary for creating nodes 7nm and smaller. The interposer base tile is fabricated on Intel's 22FFL, or "Intel 16", process. The 22FFL Fin Field-Effect Transistor (FinFET) Low-power node, first announced in March 2017, was designed for inexpensive low power operation. The interposer base tile is designed to connect tiles together and allow for die-to-die communication which does not require the most advanced, expensive nodes so an older, inexpensive node can be used instead.

Tile	Node	EUV	Die size	Ref.
Compute tile	Intel 4 (7nm EUV)	Yes	69.67 mm^{2}	
Graphics tile	TSMC N5	Yes	44.25 mm^{2}	
SoC tile	TSMC N6	Yes	100.15 mm^{2}	
I/O extender tile	TSMC N6	Yes	27.42 mm^{2}	
Foveros interposer base tile	Intel 16 (22FFL)	No	265.65 mm^{2}	

===== Mobile processors =====
Meteor Lake-H

155H, 165H, and 185H support P-core Turbo Boost 3.0 running at the same frequency as Turbo Boost 2.0.

Processor branding	Model	Cores (threads)			Base clock rate (GHz)			Turbo Boost (GHz)			Arc graphics		Smart cache	TDP			Release date	Price (USD)
Processor branding	Model	P	E	LP-E	P	E	LP-E	P	E	LP-E	Xe-cores (XVEs)	Max. freq. (GHz)	Smart cache	Base	cTDP	Turbo	Release date	Price (USD)
Core Ultra 9	185H	6 (12)	8 (8)	2 (2)	2.3	1.8	1.0	5.1	3.8	2.5	8 (128)	2.35	24 MB	45 W	35–65 W	115 W	Q4'23	$640
Core Ultra 7	165H	6 (12)	8 (8)	2 (2)	1.4	0.9	0.7	5.0	3.8	2.5	8 (128)	2.3	24 MB	28 W	20–65 W	115 W	Q4'23	$460
Core Ultra 7	155H	6 (12)	8 (8)	2 (2)	1.4	0.9	0.7	4.8	3.8	2.5	8 (128)	2.25	24 MB	28 W	20–65 W	115 W	Q4'23	$503
Core Ultra 5	135H	4 (8)	8 (8)	2 (2)	1.7	1.2	0.7	4.6	3.6	2.5	8 (128)	2.2	18 MB	28 W	20–65 W	115 W	Q4'23	$342
Core Ultra 5	125H	4 (8)	8 (8)	2 (2)	1.2	0.7	0.7	4.5	3.6	2.5	7 (112)	2.2	18 MB	28 W	20–65 W	115 W	Q4'23	$375

Meteor Lake-U

The integrated GPU is branded as "Intel Graphics" but still use the same GPU microarchitecture as "Intel Arc Graphics" on the H series models.

All models support DDR5 memory except 134U and 164U.

Processor branding	Model	Cores (threads)			Base clock rate (GHz)			Turbo Boost (GHz)			Intel Graphics		Smart cache	TDP			Release date	Price (USD) (Note: Price is Recommended Customer Price (RCP) at launch. RCP is the trade price that processors are sold by Intel to retailers and OEMs. Actual MSRP for consumers is higher)
Processor branding	Model	P	E	LP-E	P	E	LP-E	P	E	LP-E	Xe-cores (XVEs)	Max. freq. (GHz)	Smart cache	Base	cTDP	Turbo	Release date	Price (USD)
Low power (MTL-U15)
Core Ultra 7	165U	2 (4)	8 (8)	2 (2)	1.7	1.2	0.7	4.9	3.8	2.1	4 (64)	2.0	12 MB	15 W	12–28 W	57 W	Q4'23	$448
Core Ultra 7	155U	2 (4)	8 (8)	2 (2)	1.7	1.2	0.7	4.8	3.8	2.1	4 (64)	1.95	12 MB	15 W	12–28 W	57 W	Q4'23	$490
Core Ultra 5	135U	2 (4)	8 (8)	2 (2)	1.6	1.1	0.7	4.4	3.6	2.1	4 (64)	1.9	12 MB	15 W	12–28 W	57 W	Q4'23	$332
Core Ultra 5	125U	2 (4)	8 (8)	2 (2)	1.3	0.8	0.7	4.3	3.6	2.1	4 (64)	1.85	12 MB	15 W	12–28 W	57 W	Q4'23	$363
Core Ultra 5	115U	2 (4)	4 (4)	2 (2)	1.5	1.0	0.7	4.2	3.5	2.1	3 (48)	1.8	10 MB	15 W	12–28 W	57 W	Q4'23	unspecified
Ultra low power (MTL-U9)
Core Ultra 7	164U	2 (4)	8 (8)	2 (2)	1.1	0.7	0.4	4.8	3.8	2.1	4 (64)	1.8	12 MB	9 W	9–15 W	30 W	Q4'23	$448
Core Ultra 5	134U	2 (4)	8 (8)	2 (2)	0.7	0.5	0.4	4.4	3.6	2.1	4 (64)	1.75	12 MB	9 W	9–15 W	30 W	Q4'23	$332

===== Processors for Internet of Things (IoT) devices and embedded systems (Meteor Lake-PS) =====
High-power

155HL and 165HL support P-core Turbo Boost 3.0 running at the same frequency as Turbo Boost 2.0.

Processor branding	Model	Cores (threads)			Base clock rate (GHz)			Turbo Boost (GHz)			Arc graphics		Smart cache	TDP			Release date	Price (USD) (Note: Price is Recommended Customer Price (RCP) at launch. RCP is the trade price that processors are sold by Intel to retailers and OEMs. Actual MSRP for consumers is higher)
Processor branding	Model	P	E	LP-E	P	E	LP-E	P	E	LP-E	Xe-cores (XVEs)	Max. freq. (GHz)	Smart cache	Base	cTDP	Turbo	Release date	Price (USD)
Core Ultra 7	165HL	6 (12)	8 (8)	2 (2)	1.4	0.9	0.7	5.0	3.8	2.5	8 (128)	2.3	24 MB	45 W	20–65 W	115 W	Q2'24	$459
Core Ultra 7	155HL	6 (12)	8 (8)	2 (2)	1.4	0.9	0.7	4.8	3.8	2.5	8 (128)	2.25	24 MB	45 W	20–65 W	115 W	Q2'24	$438
Core Ultra 5	135HL	4 (8)	8 (8)	2 (2)	1.7	1.2	0.7	4.6	3.6	2.5	8 (128)	2.2	18 MB	45 W	20–65 W	115 W	Q2'24	$341
Core Ultra 5	125HL	4 (8)	8 (8)	2 (2)	1.2	0.7	0.7	4.5	3.6	2.5	7 (112)	2.2	18 MB	45 W	20–65 W	115 W	Q2'24	$325

Low-power

The integrated GPU is branded as "Intel Graphics" but still use the same GPU microarchitecture as "Intel Arc Graphics" on the high-power models.

Processor branding	Model	Cores (threads)			Base clock rate (GHz)			Turbo Boost (GHz)			Intel Graphics		Smart cache	TDP			Release date	Price (USD) (Note: Price is Recommended Customer Price (RCP) at launch. RCP is the trade price that processors are sold by Intel to retailers and OEMs. Actual MSRP for consumers is higher)
Processor branding	Model	P	E	LP-E	P	E	LP-E	P	E	LP-E	Xe-cores (XVEs)	Max. freq. (GHz)	Smart cache	Base	cTDP	Turbo	Release date	Price (USD)
Core Ultra 7	165UL	2 (4)	8 (8)	2 (2)	1.7	1.2	0.7	4.9	3.8	2.1	4 (64)	2.0	12 MB	15 W	12–28 W	57 W	Q2'24	$447
Core Ultra 7	155UL	2 (4)	8 (8)	2 (2)	1.7	1.2	0.7	4.8	3.8	2.1	4 (64)	1.95	12 MB	15 W	12–28 W	57 W	Q2'24	$426
Core Ultra 5	135UL	2 (4)	8 (8)	2 (2)	1.6	1.1	0.7	4.4	3.6	2.1	4 (64)	1.9	12 MB	15 W	12–28 W	57 W	Q2'24	$331
Core Ultra 5	125UL	2 (4)	8 (8)	2 (2)	1.3	0.8	0.7	4.3	3.6	2.1	4 (64)	1.85	12 MB	15 W	12–28 W	57 W	Q2'24	$309
Core Ultra 3	105UL	2 (4)	4 (4)	2 (2)	1.5	1.0	0.7	4.2	3.5	2.1	3 (48)	1.8	10 MB	15 W	12–28 W	57 W	Q2'24	$295

=== Series 2 ===
==== Lunar Lake ====
===== Mobile processors =====
Processor branding	Model	Cores (threads)		Clock rate (GHz)			Arc Graphics		NPU (TOPS)	Smart cache (Note: Only the P-cores can access this L3 cache)	RAM	TDP			Release date	Price(USD)
Processor branding	Model	Cores (threads)		Base	Turbo		Arc Graphics		NPU (TOPS)	Smart cache	RAM	TDP			Release date	Price(USD)
Processor branding	Model	P	LP-E	Base	P	LP-E	X^{e} cores (XVEs)	Max. freq. (GHz)	NPU (TOPS)	Smart cache	RAM	Base	Turbo	cTDP	Release date	Price(USD)
Core Ultra 9	288V	4 (4)	4 (4)	3.3	5.1	3.7	8 (64)	2.05	48	12 MB	32 GB	30 W	37 W	17-37 W	Sep 24, 2024	$686
Core Ultra 7	268V	4 (4)	4 (4)	2.2	5.0	3.7	8 (64)	2.0	48	12 MB	32 GB	17 W	37 W	8-37 W	Sep 24, 2024	$571
Core Ultra 7	266V	4 (4)	4 (4)	2.2	5.0	3.7	8 (64)	2.0	48	12 MB	16 GB	17 W	37 W	8-37 W	Sep 24, 2024	$520
Core Ultra 7	258V	4 (4)	4 (4)	2.2	4.8	3.7	8 (64)	1.95	47	12 MB	32 GB	17 W	37 W	8-37 W	Sep 24, 2024	$613
Core Ultra 7	256V	4 (4)	4 (4)	2.2	4.8	3.7	8 (64)	1.95	47	12 MB	16 GB	17 W	37 W	8-37 W	Sep 24, 2024	$563
Core Ultra 5	238V	4 (4)	4 (4)	2.1	4.7	3.5	7 (56)	1.85	40	8 MB	32 GB	17 W	37 W	8-37 W	Sep 24, 2024	$454
Core Ultra 5	236V	4 (4)	4 (4)	2.1	4.7	3.5	7 (56)	1.85	40	8 MB	16 GB	17 W	37 W	8-37 W	Sep 24, 2024	$403
Core Ultra 5	228V	4 (4)	4 (4)	2.1	4.5	3.5	7 (56)	1.85	40	8 MB	32 GB	17 W	37 W	8-37 W	Sep 24, 2024	$485
Core Ultra 5	226V	4 (4)	4 (4)	2.1	4.5	3.5	7 (56)	1.85	40	8 MB	16 GB	17 W	37 W	8-37 W	Sep 24, 2024	$435

==== Arrow Lake ====
Arrow Lake is Intel’s codename for the second generation Core Ultra processors. Announced on October 10, 2024, Arrow Lake is the first series of desktop Intel processors not to feature a monolithic design, instead adopting the chiplet design used on Meteor Lake. Intel primarily markets this product as being on-par with Raptor Lake in performance whilst being much more power efficient. The processors use the LGA 1851 socket with the 800 series chipset. It also represented a shift in branding, from the Intel Core 'i' series branding to the new 'Intel Core Ultra' branding for Intel's desktop processors.

Arrow Lake features multiple new architectural innovations over the previous generation Raptor Lake desktop processors, such as utilizing a chiplet-based 'tile' design, with the flagship 285K processor having six tiles, including a compute tile, SoC tile, graphics tile, I/O tile, and a filler tile. All tiles are placed over an interposer base tile, packaged via Intel's Foveros Technology. Most of Arrow Lake is also built using TSMC's process nodes, except the base tile built using Intel's 22nm node. Arrow Lake is also the first Intel desktop processor lineup to feature an NPU, with each processor containing an NPU capable of up to 13 trillion operations per second (TOPS).

Arrow Lake released on October 24, 2024, to mixed reviews due to its lack of generational performance uplift or even performance regression in some cases. Many reviewers also noticed that the processors had multiple bugs at launch, and inconsistent performance caused by certain BIOS configurations. Intel addressed this issue via a series of microcode and Windows updates released through December 2024 and January 2025, aiming to improve performance and to fix bugs with the platform, although some reviewers noticed no satisfactory gains, and sometimes even further regressions caused by the microcode update.

In addition to the Core Ultra 200S Arrow Lake desktop processors, Intel also announced the Core Ultra 200H, Core Ultra 200HX, and Core Ultra 200U Arrow Lake processors for mobile at CES 2025.

===== Desktop processors =====
Arrow Lake-S

Branding	Model	Cores (threads)		Clock rate (GHz)						Arc Graphics		NPU	Smart cache (MB)	TDP (W)		Released	Price (USD) (Note: Price is Recommended Customer Price (RCP) at launch. RCP is the trade price that processors are sold by Intel to retailers and OEMs. Actual MSRP for consumers is higher)
Branding	Model	Cores (threads)		Base		Turbo Boost				X^{e} cores	Max. freq. (GHz)	NPU	Smart cache (MB)	TDP (W)		Released	Price (USD)
Branding	Model	Cores (threads)		Base		2.0		3.0	TVB	X^{e} cores	Max. freq. (GHz)	NPU	Smart cache (MB)	TDP (W)		Released	Price (USD)
Branding	Model	P	E	P	E	P	E	P	P	X^{e} cores	Max. freq. (GHz)	NPU	Smart cache (MB)	Base	Turbo	Released	Price (USD)
Core Ultra 9	285K	8 (8)	16 (16)	3.7	3.2	5.5	4.6	5.6	5.7	4	2.0	13	36	125	250	Oct 24, 2024	$589
Core Ultra 9	285	8 (8)	16 (16)	2.5	1.9	5.4	4.6	5.5	5.6	4	2.0	13	36	65	182	Jan 6, 2025	$549
Core Ultra 9	285T	8 (8)	16 (16)	1.4	1.2	5.3	4.6	5.5	—N/a	4	2.0	13	36	35	112	Jan 6, 2025	$549
Core Ultra 7	270K Plus	8 (8)	16 (16)	3.7	3.2	5.4	4.7	5.5	—N/a	4	2.0	13	36	125	250	Mar 26, 2026	$289
Core Ultra 7	265K	8 (8)	12 (12)	3.9	3.3	5.4	4.6	5.5	—N/a	4	2.0	13	30	125	250	Oct 24, 2024	$394
Core Ultra 7	265KF	8 (8)	12 (12)	3.9	3.3	5.4	4.6	5.5	—N/a	—N/a		13	30	125	250	Oct 24, 2024	$379
Core Ultra 7	265	8 (8)	12 (12)	2.4	1.8	5.2	4.6	5.3	—N/a	4	1.95	13	30	65	182	Jan 6, 2025	$384
Core Ultra 7	265F	8 (8)	12 (12)	2.4	1.8	5.2	4.6	5.3	—N/a	—N/a		13	30	65	182	Jan 6, 2025	$369
Core Ultra 7	265T	8 (8)	12 (12)	1.5	1.2	5.2	4.6	5.3	—N/a	4	1.95	13	30	35	112	Jan 6, 2025	$384
Core Ultra 5	245K	6 (6)	8 (8)	4.2	3.6	5.2	4.6	—N/a	—N/a	4	1.9	13	24	125	159	Oct 24, 2024	$309
Core Ultra 5	245KF	6 (6)	8 (8)	4.2	3.6	5.2	4.6	—N/a	—N/a	—N/a		13	24	125	159	Oct 24, 2024	$294
Core Ultra 5	245	6 (6)	8 (8)	3.5	3.0	5.1	4.5	—N/a	—N/a	4	1.9	13	24	65	121	Jan 6, 2025	$270
Core Ultra 5	245T	6 (6)	8 (8)	2.5	1.9	5.1	4.5	—N/a	—N/a	4	1.9	13	24	35	114	Jan 6, 2025	$270
Core Ultra 5	235	6 (6)	8 (8)	3.4	2.9	5.0	4.4	—N/a	—N/a	3	2.0	13	24	65	121	Jan 6, 2025	$247
Core Ultra 5	235T	6 (6)	8 (8)	2.2	1.6	5.0	4.4	—N/a	—N/a	3	2.0	13	24	35	114	Jan 6, 2025	$247
Core Ultra 5	225	6 (6)	4 (4)	3.3	2.7	4.9	4.4	—N/a	—N/a	2	1.8	13	20	65	121	Jan 6, 2025	$236
Core Ultra 5	225F	6 (6)	4 (4)	3.3	2.7	4.9	4.4	—N/a	—N/a	—N/a		13	20	65	121	Jan 6, 2025	$221
Core Ultra 5	225T	6 (6)	4 (4)	2.5	1.9	4.9	4.4	—N/a	—N/a	2	1.8	13	20	35	114	Jan 6, 2025	$221

=== Series 3 ===
Product Name	Launch Date	Total Core Count	Max Turbo Frequency	Onboard Cache	Integrated Graphics Name
Intel Core 7 processor 360 (6M Cache, up to 4.80 GHz)	Q2'26	6	4.8 GHz	6 MB Intel Smart Cache	Intel Graphics
Intel Core 7 processor 350 (6M Cache, up to 4.80 GHz)	Q2'26	6	4.8 GHz	6 MB Intel Smart Cache	Intel Graphics
Intel Core 5 processor 330 (6M Cache, up to 4.60 GHz)	Q2'26	6	4.6 GHz	6 MB Intel Smart Cache	Intel Graphics
Intel Core 5 processor 320 (6M Cache, up to 4.60 GHz)	Q2'26	6	4.6 GHz	6 MB Intel Smart Cache	Intel Graphics
Intel Core 5 processor 315 (6M Cache, up to 4.40 GHz)	Q2'26	6	4.4 GHz	6 MB Intel Smart Cache	Intel Graphics
Intel Core 3 processor 305 (6M Cache, up to 4.30 GHz)	Q2'26	6	4.3 GHz	6 MB Intel Smart Cache	Intel Graphics
Intel Core 3 processor 304 (6M Cache, up to 4.30 GHz)	Q2'26	5	4.3 GHz	6 MB Intel Smart Cache	Intel Graphics

== Reception ==
=== Speculative execution CPU vulnerabilities ===
Transient execution CPU vulnerabilities are vulnerabilities in which instructions, most often optimized using speculative execution, are executed temporarily by a microprocessor, without committing their results due to a misprediction or error, resulting in leaking secret data to an unauthorized party. The archetype is Spectre, and transient execution attacks like Spectre belong to the cache-attack category, one of several categories of side-channel attacks. Since January 2018 many different cache-attack vulnerabilities have been identified.

== See also ==
- Intel Core (microarchitecture)
- List of Intel graphics processing units
- List of Intel processors
- List of Intel Core desktop processors
- List of Intel chipsets
- Ryzen
- Zen (microarchitecture)

Preceded by Pentium	Intel Core; 2006–present
